= Death of Wanda Jean Mays =

Woman who disappeared on Georgia Mountain, Alabama in 1986

Wanda Jean Mays
- Born: August 19, 1959; Panama City, Panama
- Disappeared: May 11 or 12, 1986
- Status: Remains identified January 2008
- Died: May 12, 1986 (aged 26); Marshall County, Alabama, U.S.
- Cause of death: Accidental fall
- Resting place: Brookwood Cemetery, Arab, Alabama, U.S. 34.3359°N 86.4553°E
- Known for: Missing person
- Height: 5 ft 8 in (1.73 m)

Wanda Jean Mays (August 19, 1959 – May 12, 1986) was an American woman who disappeared on Georgia Mountain near Guntersville, Alabama in 1986. She was reported missing by her aunt and uncle in the early morning hours of May 12, when they found the guest room in which she was staying empty, its window apparently broken from inside. Mays' bloodied nightgown was found behind the family's home on Guntersville Lake, as was an empty canoe, also covered with blood, floating in the lake.

The unusual details surrounding Mays' disappearance led her case to receive national attention, and it was profiled on the series Unsolved Mysteries twice beginning in 1987. With no leads, however, her disappearance became a cold case.

In 2008, twenty-two years after her disappearance, it was confirmed by the Federal Bureau of Investigation's laboratory in Quantico, Virginia that formerly unidentified skeletal remains discovered in 2003 were those of Mays. Her death was officially ruled accidental.

== Early life ==
Wanda Jean Mays was born in 1959 to Jim and Dorothy (Dot) Mays in Panama, where her father had been stationed in the military. Mays grew up in Arkansas, Alabama and Texas. She attended Arab High school in Arab, Alabama, and graduated from Wallace State College. At the time of Mays' disappearance, she was working as a secretary at Redstone Arsenal, a United States Army post.

== Disappearance ==
After meeting her parents for dinner on the evening of May 11, 1986, Mays stopped by the home of her aunt and uncle, Tyrus and Betty Dorman Sr., located on Georgia Mountain in Marshall County, Alabama, near Guntersville Lake. According to her father, Mays had reportedly been exhibiting signs of emotional distress at the time from a "chemical imbalance" that had been attributed to dieting. Mays decided to spend the night at her aunt and uncle's home rather than drive back to her apartment that evening, and went to bed at approximately 10:30pm. This was the last time she was seen alive.

The following morning at 5am, May 12, the Dormans, while attempting to wake Wanda for her job, found the guest bedroom Mays had stayed in was locked. After accessing the room, the Dormans found the double-paned Venetian glass bedroom window had been broken from inside the house, and discovered blood on the window; however, no one in the house reported hearing the window break during the night. The bed had appeared to not have been slept in, and Mays' personal belongings were on the nightstand. On a boat dock on the lake, Mays' torn nightgown was discovered with bloodstains on it.

=== Alleged sightings ===
On the morning of May 12, 1986, a local resident reported seeing a young woman matching Mays' description walking along Alabama State Route 62 near Guntersville, wearing oversized jeans. The witness stated that the woman's hair was wet, as if she'd been swimming. The following day, May 13, approximately 30 miles (48 km) away in Huntsville, Alabama, a female witness claimed to have seen a woman matching Mays' description sitting in the back seat of a car with two unidentified men at a convenience store; according to the witness, the woman appeared to be afraid. When the witness exited the convenience store, she saw the woman again, this time talking on a payphone beside one of the unidentified men.

== Investigation ==
Initially believing Mays had drowned in the lake, Marshall County rescuers sent search divers to look for a potential body. Additionally, the lake was dragged, but no sign of Mays was found. During the search, an empty canoe was discovered drifting on the water; upon inspection, blood was discovered in the canoe. Upon lab testing, the blood discovered in the canoe was confirmed to match Mays' blood type. A homicide investigator, Edward Teal, was subsequently brought in to examine the case, and deemed it the "most mysterious case" he had ever worked on.

A year after her disappearance, Mays' case was featured on the network series Unsolved Mysteries with host Karl Malden.

== Discovery ==
In October 2003, a hiker searching for ginseng plants discovered human bones at the foot of a 150 foot (46 m) cliff approximately 1.8 miles (2.9 km) from the Dormans' home in Guntersville. The remains were unidentified until 2008, when they were sent to the Federal Bureau of Investigation's DNA lab in Quantico, Virginia for testing; the FBI confirmed in January 2008 that the remains matched Mays.

=== Ruling ===
In an official statement made by Marshall County Police Sheriff Scott Walls, Mays' death was ruled as accidental, with claims that no foul play was suspected; investigators believed Mays had unintentionally fallen from the cliff where she was discovered. In an official statement, Walls said: "We have found no evidence whatsoever of any foul play. Wanda Jean Mays' death was accidental. We have concluded that Miss Mays, who was suffering at the time from a known chemical imbalance, left the home on her own accord."

One of Mays' brothers, John, made a public statement after the discovery, agreeing with the police's determination, citing his sister's frequent and unprovoked panic attacks as a probable cause for her death: "You know the window was broken from the inside that she went out of. She had an attack and it was something that scared her. She would just get terrified when she had these attacks. She would just be terrified of everything."

== See also ==
- List of solved missing person cases (1980s)
