= Richard Floyd =

Richard Floyd may refer to:

- Richard Floyd (California politician) (1931–2011), state legislator of California
- Richard Floyd (Tennessee politician) (born 1944), state legislator of Tennessee
- Richard Ferdinand Floyd (1810–1870), military officer in Florida
