= Charles C. Walcutt =

American politician

Charles Carroll Walcutt
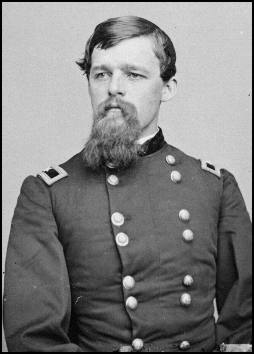
- Charles Carroll Walcutt
- Born: February 12, 1838; Columbus, Ohio
- Died: May 2, 1898 (aged 60); Omaha, Nebraska
- Burial place: Green Lawn Cemetery, Columbus, Ohio
- Military career
- Allegiance: United States of America; Union
- Branch: United States Army; Union Army
- Service years: 1861–1866
- Rank: Brigadier General; Brevet Major General
- Commands: 46th Ohio Infantry
- Conflicts: American Civil War: Battle of Shiloh; Vicksburg Campaign; Battle of Jackson; Battle of Missionary Ridge; Battle of Griswoldville

Charles Carroll Walcutt (February 12, 1838 – May 2, 1898) was an American surveyor, soldier, and politician, and a maternal cousin to Davy Crockett. He served as a general in the Union Army during the American Civil War, in which he was wounded twice.

After the war, Walcutt was warden of the Ohio State Penitentiary and also was active in civic affairs in Ohio, and his death was attributed to his wounds from the Civil War.

== Early life and career ==
Charles Carroll Walcutt was born in 1838 in the city of Columbus. He was a son of John M. Walcutt, a chair maker, and Mariel Broderick, and had three sisters, one of whom was named Virginia. Walcutt's maternal grandmother was also a first cousin of Davy Crockett. Both his father (War of 1812) and grandfather (American Revolution) had served the United States in combat.

Walcutt received his initial education in the Columbus-area schools, and then in 1854 entered the Kentucky Military Institute in Lyndon, Kentucky. He graduated in June 1858, intending to become a civil engineer, and he was elected Franklin County's surveyor the following year. Walcutt married Phebe Neill in 1860. She was born in Belfast, Ireland, and was a daughter of Hugh Neill, who had served as an officer in the British Army. The couple had three children together, sons named J. Macy, Sherman, and Charles Carroll Jr. Charles Walcutt Jr. was a career Army officer and attained the rank of brigadier general as head of the Bureau of Insular Affairs.

== Civil War service ==
When the American Civil War began in 1861, Walcutt chose to follow his home state and the Union cause. On April 15 he organized a company of soldiers in Columbus, was appointed its captain on April 17, and went into camp with them the next day. However, Ohio's quota had already been met and Walcutt's company was rejected for Federal use. That June he was appointed a major in the state forces and served on the staff of Ohio Militia Brig. Gen. Charles W. Hill in what is now West Virginia.

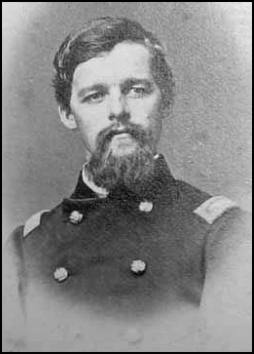
Walcutt as a Union colonel

That fall Walcutt helped raise and train the 46th Ohio Infantry. He was appointed to the Union Army as a major in that regiment on October 1, and was promoted to lieutenant colonel on January 30, 1862. Walcutt reported to Paducah, Kentucky, for duty that February, and in March he went with the army up the Tennessee River. The 46th Ohio saw its first combat on April 6 during the Battle of Shiloh. In this fight Walcutt was hit in his left shoulder, and the bullet remained there for the rest of his life.

Walcutt was promoted to colonel on October 16, 1862, and given command of the 46th Ohio. He led his regiment in the Vicksburg Campaign in Mississippi from December 1862 until July 1863. During the campaign, Walcutt fought in the Union victory at the Battle of Jackson on May 14. He then fought with distinction in the Battle of Missionary Ridge at Chattanooga, Tennessee, on November 23–25. When Brig. Gen. John M. Corse was seriously wounded, command of his brigade fell to Walcutt, who led it and held "against repeated charges by superior numbers." After the fight his overall commander, Maj. Gen. William T. Sherman, praised Walcutt's efforts in his official report and recommended a promotion. In the report Sherman stated:

The fight raged furiously about 10 a.m. when General Corse received a severe wound and was brought off the field, and the command of the brigade, and of the assault at that key point devolved upon that fine, young gallant officer, Colonel Walcutt, of the Forty-sixth Ohio, who filled his part manfully. He continued the contest, pressing forward at all points.

The entire brigade re-enlisted on January 5, 1864, an action that highly pleased Walcutt. After leaving Chattanooga, he continued to lead the brigade and fought in the Atlanta campaign that summer. Walcutt participated in the Battle of Kennesaw Mountain on June 27, and the Battle of Atlanta on July 22. He was promoted to the rank of brigadier general on July 30. Walcutt's home town newspaper gave this version of his efforts around Atlanta in his obituary:

The men fought to the front, flank and rear; and at one time Colonel Walcutt was ordered to retire, as he was almost completely surrounded; but, feeling confident of holding his position, he disobeyed the order, and, as he was successful in his efforts, his disobedience cost him nothing. The Atlanta campaign was one continuous battle to Walcutt's brigade, but it brought him a brigadier generalship.

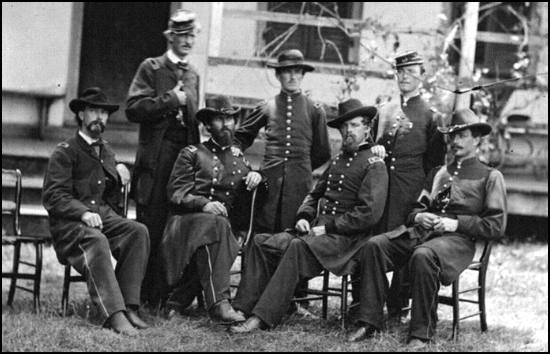
Maj. Gen. Walcutt (seated, 2nd from right) and his staff near the end of the American Civil War

Walcutt then participated in the March to the Sea in November and December 1864. He again fought with distinction at the Battle of Griswoldville on November 22, and was again wounded. His brigade of about 1,500 men moved to support Union cavalry and held a defensive position at Duncan's Farm against repeated attacks by ill-trained Confederate Georgia Militia. Combined Union losses in the fight were less than 100, including Walcutt, while the Confederates lost about 51 killed, 472 wounded, and around 600 missing or captured. Walcutt was wounded early in the action, and command of the brigade fell to Col. Robert F. Catterson of the 97th Regiment Indiana Infantry. Sherman again praised him in his report, and Maj. Gen. Oliver O. Howard said of him "there is not a braver or better officer." He was hit in his right leg by a shell fragment, and was out of action for months.

On April 4, 1865, Walcutt was recovered enough to command the 1st division of the XIV Corps, leading it in the grand review in Washington, D.C., until June 12. After hostilities ended he led his command to Louisville, Kentucky, where it was mustered out of the volunteer service that August. Walcutt served in the western department until he was mustered out of the Union Army on January 15, 1866. For his actions at Griswoldville, President of the United States Andrew Johnson appointed Walcutt to the grade of brevet major general of volunteers, to rank from March 13, 1865, and nominated him for commissioning to that grade on January 18, 1866, and the United States Senate confirmed the appointment on March 12, 1866.

== Postbellum career ==
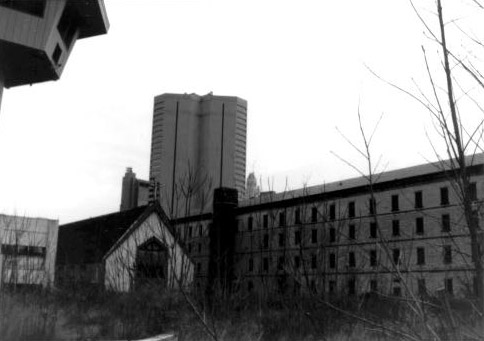
Courtyard of the former Ohio Penitentiary

After the war Walcutt went home, where he was warden of the Ohio Penitentiary in Columbus in 1866. On July 28 he was appointed lieutenant colonel of the 10th U.S. Cavalry, and proceeded to Fort Leavenworth, Kansas, to report for duty. He resigned on December 1, 1866, "unwilling to endure army life in time of peace." Walcutt returned to Ohio and again worked as a warden until 1869.

Walcutt was also active in politics in Ohio, and was one of Ulysses S. Grant's electors in 1868. In May he was appointed the U.S. Internal Revenue Service collector for the 7th district of Ohio by President Grant, which he held until July 1, 1883. In 1872 Walcutt was elected to the Columbus board of education, with seven years as its president, until April 1, 1894. Also in 1872 he was a delegate to the Republican National Convention held in Philadelphia, Pennsylvania. In April 1883 he was elected mayor of Columbus, elected to a second term, retired in April 1887 and succeeded by Philip H. Bruck. His wife Phebe died the following year.

In 1898 Walcutt was in Omaha, Nebraska, heading back to Ohio after visiting Mexico with his sister Virginia "for his health." There his condition worsened, and he stayed in Omaha for about six weeks. Ten days before his death doctors amputated one of his limbs. His body was brought back to Ohio and was buried in Green Lawn Cemetery in Columbus.

== See also ==
- List of American Civil War generals (Union)
