= Samuel Griswold =

American businessman (1790–1867)

- Born: December 27, 1790; Burlington, Connecticut, US
- Died: September 14, 1867 (aged 76); Clinton, Georgia, US
- Occupations: Industrialist, Gunsmith

Samuel Griswold (December 27, 1790 in Burlington, Connecticut – September 14, 1867 in Clinton, Georgia) was an American industrial pioneer in the 1820s based in central Georgia. He was the founder of Griswoldville village, an industrial site. His father was Jeremiah Griswold (1745–1813) and his mother was Phoebe Case (1751–1798).

== Early life ==
Samuel Griswold was born on December 27, 1790, in Burlington, Connecticut, a member of the prominent Connecticut Griswold family. He moved to Clinton, Georgia, near present-day Gray, with his parents in 1818.

== Career ==
In Georgia, he created a successful cotton gin factory, in 1830, that quickly became the largest producer of cotton gins in the nation. One of his colleagues was Daniel Pratt, who later moved to Alabama and became an important industrial figure and the founder of Prattville, Alabama. Griswold's village, Griswoldville, was an industrial site/company town with a cotton gin plant, soap and tallow factory, candle factory, saw and grist mill, post office and non-denominational church.

At the outbreak of the American Civil War, the Griswold cotton gin factory was leased to the Confederate government and retooled to make pistols and munitions at the behest of Georgia governor Joseph E. Brown. Griswoldville also served as a mustering site for Confederate and state troops. The revolver produced at Griswoldville was called the Griswold and Grier Revolver, and later on called the Griswold Gunnison, after Arvin Nye Gunnison, Griswold's business partner. The Griswold Gunnison revolvers are reduced sized copies of the Colt Dragoon, round barrel not octagonal (but in .36 cal not .44) and were made with distinctive brass frames because of the shortage of steel in the South. Also typical of the Griswold is a cylinder manufactured from twisted iron instead of steel. However, Griswoldville was destroyed on November 20, 1864, by Captain Frederick S. Ladd and his men of the 9th Michigan Volunteer Cavalry Regiment. The Battle of Griswoldville was the first battle of Sherman's March to the Sea.

After the Civil War, he sold a portion of his property and retired.

== Death ==
He died in September 1867.

== In popular culture ==
Cullen Bohannon, the Confederate Army veteran and protagonist of AMC's Hell on Wheels, carries a Griswold revolver. That fact is established in the pilot episode and is a plot point in multiple episodes (e.g., season 3, episode 6), in which the distinctive gun is used, shown, or mentioned.
