= 1919 Columbus, Ohio mayoral election =

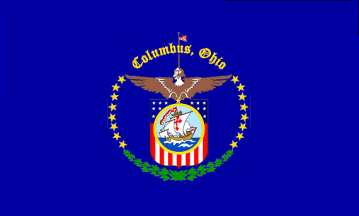
- November 4, 1919
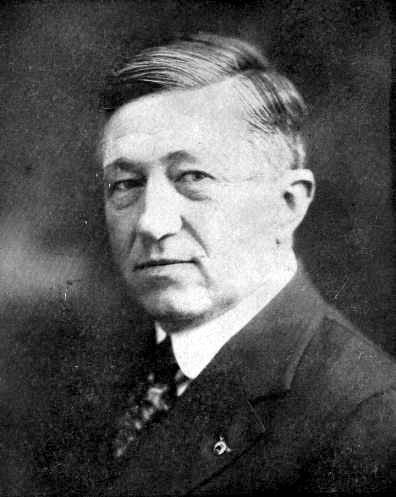

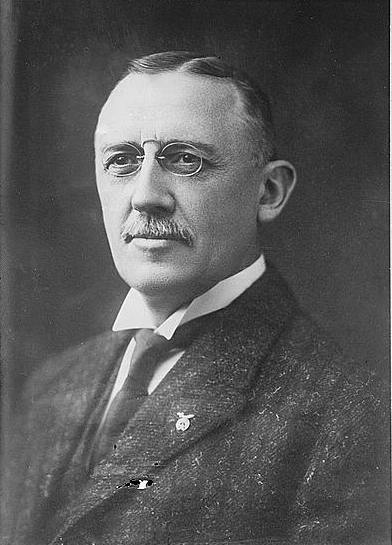
Candidate	James J. Thomas	George J. Karb
Party	Republican	Democratic
Popular vote	31,188	26,288
Mayor before election
George J. Karb
Democratic
Elected mayor
James J. Thomas
Republican

The Columbus mayoral election of 1919 was the 61st mayoral election in Columbus, Ohio. It was held on Tuesday, November 4, 1919. Incumbent Democratic mayor George J. Karb was defeated by Republican party nominee James J. Thomas.

== Bibliography ==
- Hooper, Osman Castle (1920). History of the City of Columbus, Ohio : From the Founding of Franklinton in 1797, Through the World War Period, to the Year 1920. Columbus, Ohio: Higginson Book Company.
