= Pleasant J. Philips =

American planter, banker, and Confederate militia general (1819-1876)

Pleasant Jackson Philips
- Born: July 3, 1819; Harris County, Georgia
- Died: October 12, 1876 (aged 57); Wynnton, Georgia
- Burial place: Linnwood Cemetery in Columbus, Georgia
- Military career
- Allegiance: Confederate States of America
- Branch: Confederate States Army
- Service years: 1861–65
- Rank: Brigadier General
- Units: 2nd BDE, Georgia Militia Division
- Conflicts: Battle of Utoy Creek, GA, Battle of Griswoldsville, GA; American Civil War

Pleasant Jackson Philips (July 3, 1819 – October 12, 1876) was an American planter, banker, and soldier. He served as a Confederate colonel and brigadier general in the Georgia Militia during the American Civil War. In his capacity as a militia general, he commanded the Confederate infantry force of Georgia militia in the 1864 Battle of Griswoldville, Georgia. After the war he resumed his banking career.

== Early life and career ==
Pleasant J. Philips was born in 1819 in Georgia. His surname is often recorded as 'Phillips' however his gravestone, his signature, and the dedication of a presentation sword to him all refer to 'Philips'. He was a son of Charles Phillips, an American soldier from North Carolina (member of the Georgia House of Representatives in 1821 and 1822, the Georgia Senate in 1823 and Georgia Militia general from 1825 to 1828), and his wife Anne Nicks. Pleasant Philips prospered as a plantation owner and slaveholder in Harris County, as well as the Bank of Brunswick president. He married Laura Osborne in Harris County, Georgia on November 19, 1838, according to the county's marriage records. By 1860 he had relocated to Columbus, and also was very active in the Georgia State Militia, reaching the rank of major by 1861.

== Civil War service ==
When the American Civil War began in 1861, Philips chose to follow his home state of Georgia and the Confederate cause. On November 18 he was elected colonel of the 31st Georgia Infantry, assuming command of the regiment on the following day. Philips was then ordered to Savannah, Georgia, where it spent that winter. During the reorganization of the Confederate Army in the spring of 1862, Philips was not re-elected and resigned his commission on May 13. That same day Maj. Clement A. Evans was named colonel and replaced Philips in command of the 31st Georgia.

After resigning Philips returned home to Columbus. On July 7, 1862, he was appointed a brigadier general in Georgia's Militia, and spent a brief period serving in Virginia. Following the 1863 reorganization of the state forces, he was appointed colonel and commander of one of Georgia's military districts. By 1864 Philips was again a brigadier general, commanding the 2nd Brigade, 1st Division of the militia. In July this force was ordered to join the Army of Tennessee during the Siege of Atlanta, attached to Bate's Division, Lt General S. D. Lee's Corps, Along the Sandtown Road, during the Battle of Utoy Creek Aug 1-10 1864, and serving throughout the siege there until September.

=== Griswoldville ===
Following the 1864 surrender of Atlanta, Philips and his command returned to Georgia and the men were granted a 30-day furlough, allowing them time to harvest crops from their lands. That fall his force was separated from the Army of Tennessee and ordered to oppose Sherman's March to the Sea, fighting at the Battle of Griswoldville near Macon on October 22, following a four-hour march from Macon. Hoping to slow if not block the Union Army advance across Georgia, Maj. Gen. Joseph Wheeler's cavalry force attacked Union cavalry around Macon. Wheeler achieved some brief success but infantry commanded by Brig. Gen. Charles C. Walcutt arrived to support the Union troops, who forced Wheeler back and then assumed a defensive position. Philips and his militia division (described as "ill equipped, poorly trained") attacked this position three times and were repulsed. The assaults were described as:

As soon as they came within range of our muskets, a most terrific fire was poured into their ranks, doing fearful execution ... still they moved forward, and came within 45 yards of our works. Here they attempted to reform their line, but so destructive was the fire that they were compelled to retire.

The Confederates lost about 51 dead and 472 wounded plus around 600 missing, compared to less than 100 Union losses. Prior to this fight Philips' commander, G.W. Smith, had ordered the militia not to engage the advancing Union soldiers, but Philips thought he had located an isolated and unsupported brigade and attacked, in clear disobedience of Smith's instructions. He received much criticism for his actions, and was rumored to be drunk at the crucial moment as well. The spirited but futile attack by Philips has been described as "...while it reflects great credit upon the gallantry of the Confederate and State forces engaged, was unnecessary, unexpected and utterly unproductive of any good." Following the action at Griswoldville, Philips resigned from the Confederate service in November.

== Postbellum career ==
After resigning Philips returned to Columbus, Georgia, and his banking career. He died at his home in Wynnton in 1876, and was buried in Linnwood Cemetery in Columbus.

== See also ==
List of American Civil War Generals (Acting Confederate)
