= George J. Karb =

American politician (1858–1937)

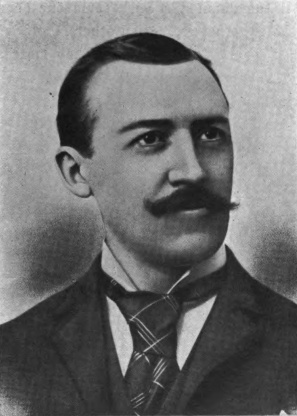

30th and 39th Mayor of Columbus
- In office January 1, 1912 – January 1, 1920
- Preceded by: George S. Marshall
- Succeeded by: James J. Thomas
- In office 1891–1894
- Preceded by: Philip H. Bruck
- Succeeded by: Cotton H. Allen

Personal details
- Born: George John Karb; February 15, 1858 Columbus, Ohio
- Died: May 15, 1937 (aged 79) Columbus, Ohio
- Resting place: Green Lawn Abbey; Columbus, Ohio
- Party: Democratic
- Spouse: Kate M. Van Dine
- Profession: Druggist; County Sheriff; Mayor; Police Commissioner; Member of City Council

George John Karb (February 15, 1858 – May 15, 1937) was the 30th and 39th mayor of Columbus, Ohio and the 27th person to serve in that office. He was first elected in 1890 and served Columbus for two consecutive terms. After four years as mayor, he was elected as Sheriff of Franklin County. He later resought election in the 1911 mayoral campaign and defeated incumbent Republican mayor George S. Marshall. He served Columbus as mayor during World War I and the Spanish Influenza of 1918. After three consecutive terms in office Karb was defeated in the 1919 mayoral election by James J. Thomas. Karb died on May 15, 1937.

== Works ==
- Columbus in the Spot Light-- Marshallism Dealt a Fearful Blow (1913)
- Columbus, Ohio, Industrial, Commercial, Financial, Residential, Institutional: The City with a Future (1919)

Political offices
Preceded by Philip H. Bruck	Mayor of Columbus, Ohio; 1891-1894	Succeeded by Cotton H. Allen
Preceded by George S. Marshall	Mayor of Columbus, Ohio; 1912-1919	Succeeded by James J. Thomas
