= John Floyd (Georgia politician) =

American politician, planter and military officer (1769 – 1839)

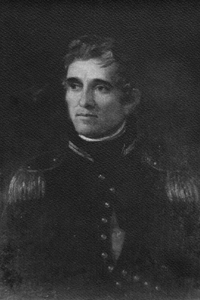

Member of the U.S. House of Representatives from Georgia's 7th district
- In office March 4, 1827 – March 3, 1829
- Preceded by: At Large districts
- Succeeded by: At Large districts

Member of the Georgia House of Representatives from Camden County
- In office 1820-1826

Personal details
- Born: October 3, 1769 Hilton Head, South Carolina
- Died: June 24, 1839 (aged 69) Camden County, Georgia
- Resting place: Floyd Family Cemetery
- Party: Jacksonian
- Spouse: Isabella Maria Hazzard
- Children: 12
- Occupation: Civil Engineer, ship builder, Planter

Military service
- Allegiance: United States
- Branch/service: Georgia Militia
- Years of service: 1804 – 1815
- Rank: Brigadier general
- Unit: First Brigade of Georgia Militia
- Battles/wars: Creek War; Battle of Autossee; Battle of Calebee Creek

Brigadier General John Floyd (October 3, 1769 – June 24, 1839) was an American politician, slave-owning planter and military officer who served in the 1st Brigade of the Georgia Militia during the War of 1812. One of the largest landowners and wealthiest men in Camden County, Georgia, Floyd also served in the Georgia House of Representatives, as well as the United States House of Representatives.

== Early and family life ==
John Floyd was born October 3, 1769, at Hilton Head, South Carolina in the Beaufort District, the only child of Charles Floyd and Mary Fendin. He was reared at Walnut Hill, his father's plantation on Hilton Head.

Charles Floyd, owner and planter of Walnut Hill Plantation, had been born March 4, 1747, in Northampton County, Virginia, the son of Samuel Floyd and Susanna "Susan" Dixon. His parents both died in Northampton County when he was six.

He went to live with his Dixon relatives, but three years later his uncle indentured the 9-year-old to a sea captain as a cabin boy. Charles Floyd spent fourteen years at sea, mainly on slave vessels in the Triangular trade, sailing to ports in Europe, Africa and elsewhere. Floyd then settled at Hilton Head, where he managed an indigo plantation. He married this Floyd's mother, Mary Fendin, in 1768 at St. Helena's Church in Beaufort District. Mary Fendin had been born April 15, 1746, in St. Helena's Parish, South Carolina, the daughter of John Fendin Jr. and Elizabeth Thomas.

The Floyds settled at Walnut Hill Plantation on the north side of Fish Haul Creek. During the American Revolutionary War in South Carolina, Charles was a member of the First Council of Safety. These men who favored independence raised a volunteer militia, the St. Helena Guards, whose hats bore a silver crescent with their motto, "Liberty or Death". In 1781, Charles Floyd, along with several others, all members of a war party called the "Bloody Legion," avenged the death of Revolutionary War hero, Charles Davant, by a Tory. Charles Davant had married Elizabeth Fendin (Bland) who was sister to Mary Fendin, so he was Charles Floyd's brother-in-law. Captain Floyd distinguished himself in forays against the British and their colonial policies. In reprisal, Tories plundered and burned the Floyd family home, but teenaged John Floyd survived, as did his mother.

When John Floyd was sixteen, he was apprenticed to a house carpenter for five years. He became so proficient at his work, he was offered an early release from the contract but refused, preferring to work the entire period. At night a distant cousin, Bernard Elliott, tutored him in a variety of subjects including higher mathematics and French. In later years, Floyd spoke this language fluently with guests who dined with him at Bellevue Plantation.

While returning home one afternoon, John Floyd met Isabella Maria Hazzard on the road as she returned from school. Their relationship flourished. However, her aunt, Mrs. Sarah Hazzard Waight, had initially objected, claiming that Isabella Maria could do much better. Isabella Maria (pronounced Mariah) Hazzard had been born January 3, 1773, in St. Marys, Camden County, Georgia, the daughter of Richard Hazzard III of Beaufort District, South Carolina and Phoebe Loftin of then-British East Florida. Some believe she was born at Loftin House, just south of the St. Marys River in Nassau County, Florida. In any event, after her mother's death, Isabella was raised, educated and groomed for society by Mrs. Waight, her father's cousin, in Beaufort, South Carolina.

John Floyd married Isabella Maria Hazzard (1773–1859) on December 12, 1793, in Beaufort District, South Carolina. They had twelve children, including U.S. Army General Charles Rinaldo Floyd (1797–1845), Confederate General Richard Ferdinand Floyd (1810-1890), and Colonel Henry Hamilton Floyd (1817–1873). Charles Rinaldo Floyd predeceased his parents, as did his brothers John (1802–1830) and Henry (1808–1811) and sister Melinda (1812–1831). His brother Samuel (1814–1878) did not fight for the Confederacy, nor did he ever formally marry, but sold the remains of Bellevue to a former slave, and lived in St. Marys with a mulatto women, with whom he had six children before he was buried in an unmarked grave in a town cemetery.

== Georgia plantation career ==
In 1795, Charles Floyd (with his wife, Mary) and John Floyd (with his wife, Isabella Maria) moved from South Carolina to McIntosh County, Georgia. They settled on adjoining farms near Darien, Georgia, called "The Thickets". In 1797, after the Treaty of Colerain, Charles Floyd ended the family's formal South Carolina ties by selling Walnut Hill Plantation to a wealthy planter, William Pope Sr.

=== Bellevue Plantation and Fairfield Plantation ===
Enslaved African on a cotton plantation in Georgia, in the 19th century

In 1800, the Floyds again moved southward, this time to Camden County, Georgia. They purchased large tracts of land located south of the Satilla River, north of the Crooked River and west of the marshes and the Cumberland River to what is now I-95. Here, in this area that became known as "Floyd's Neck," they built two large plantations a mile apart: "Fairfield" and "Bellevue".

John Floyd built Fairfield on Floyd's Creek for himself. Fairfield House was built in traditional Southern style. The house sat near a high bluff that overlooked Floyd’s Basin toward the west and Floyd’s Creek toward the east. In 1831, John Floyd gave Fairfield Plantation to his eldest son, Charles Rinaldo Floyd. Charles Rinaldo Floyd added a two-story armory in order to display his collected weapons: Swords, lances, daggers, knives, double barrel guns, dueling and long shot rifles, carbines, pistols, dueling pistols, bows and arrows. At either end of the Fairfield House stood two tall brick chimneys with large interior mantles; the floors of the house were of Georgia heart of pine. The house also had a parlor, library and a small sketching room.

John Floyd built Bellevue within view of the marshes leading to Todd's Creek for his father, Charles. Family lore claims that Floyd built Bellevue Plantation shaped as an anchor to symbolize their fortunes' link to the sea. After his father died in 1820, John moved into Bellevue, enlarging it with two upper stories made of cypress.

A blueprint of Bellevue, drawn by Hazlehurst Ross Noyes, a descendant of John Floyd, showed the three-level plantation house as a substantial dwelling. The ground floor or basement was made of tabby with walls over eight feet high and two feet thick; contained two huge fireplaces in which immense cauldrons hung on cranes, supplying hot water to the upper floor bathrooms; household storage areas; a kitchen area for last minute food preparation; the informal dining room and the curved billiard room. The first floor included a long hall, family bedrooms, dressing room, three bathrooms, children’s room, large formal dining room with double fireplaces and the drawing room. The second floor had guest rooms, fireplace and a library filled with John Floyd’s vast collection of books, some quite valuable. Raised open piazzas on two sides of the building featured heavy round columns supporting the roofs. Imposing steps lead down from the south piazza to a terrace and manicured formal lawn beyond.

Both plantations became known for their landscaping and gardens. Bellevue's curved billiard room overlooked a crescent-shaped garden, from which roses extended for a half acre. A mile-long avenue of moss-draped live oaks and cedar trees connected the two plantations, with flowering bulbs and myrtles dotted beneath.

Two hundred acres south of Bellevue were set aside as parade grounds. The land became so compressed from military drills and horse's hooves that nothing grew on it for over a hundred years.

=== Floyd's Neck ===
During the nineteenth-century plantation era, Floyd's Neck encompassed swamps, hammocks, pine barrens, forests thick with oaks, gum, cypress, as well as cleared agricultural fields. The Floyds were among the largest landowners and wealthiest families in Camden County. The family owned over 200 slaves; hosted sports club parties, balls and dinner dances at Bellevue; held hunts for wild game, and held shooting, horse and boat racing competitions; they also owned town houses in St. Mary's.

Floyd plantations used slaves to cultivate rice, indigo, and Sea Island cotton. Cotton fields stretched for miles; massive fields of potatoes were grown on Pompey's Island; both plantation houses also had views of corn fields and vegetable gardens. The Floyds also cultivated peach, orange, lemon, lime and olive trees. Fishing in Floyd’s Creek yielded an abundance of drum, whiting, blackfish, and mullet.

Wild game also fed the Floyd family and their slaves. The Camden Hunting Club built a clubhouse at Bear Hammock on Floyd property. On Independence Day July 4, 1835, after hunting for wild turkey and deer, an elegant meal was served, which included toasts. General John Floyd toasted, "The Federal Constitution – the reserved rights of the states, safeguards of the Union. We will defend them at every peril".

Graded roads, sturdy bridges over creeks, were built on Floyd's Neck. These roads led not only to other plantations but westward (inland) to the county seat, Jeffersonton (abandoned after a move back to St. Mary's in 1872), and eastward to Cabin Bluff on the Cumberland River. Bellevue was 30 miles from Jeffersonton. It took four hours on horseback from Bellevue to reach St. Marys. A horse-drawn carriage or wagon could travel from Bellevue to Cabin Bluff in about an hour. Depending on the tide and the wind, it took the Floyds four to six hours to sail in their privately owned boats from the Cabin Bluff dock to St. Marys. Eventually, steamboats could complete the journey in two hours.

Camden County, Georgia tax returns in 1809 show the combined lands owned by Charles and John Floyd as 5,825 acres. The family continued to accumulate property. In addition to Bellevue and Fairfield plantations, their holdings included: The Hermitage, Leeds Grove, Grants Tract, Jones Tract, Bryant and Grays Tract, Brookfield, Bear Hammock, Cabin Bluff, Shellbine, and Black Point; property in McIntosh County. John Floyd’s timber business prospered, and exported cotton brought in high returns.

On May 25, 1808, John and Charles Floyd purchased Little Cumberland Island from the heirs of General (Nathaniel) Nathanael Greene for $500 (~$10,078 in 2025). On August 24, 1837, John Floyd sold six acres on the north end of Little Cumberland to the United States Government for a lighthouse to be erected on St. Andrews Sound: "John Floyd... hath granted, bargained, sold unto the United States of America Six acres of Land on the Island of Little Cumberland and at the north part of the same and selected as a site for the contemplated Light House to Saint Andrews inlet as the Plat thereof".

John Floyd, a civil engineer as well as a master boat builder, used his workers and his expertise to construct schooners and merchant vessels for shipping and trade.

== War of 1812 ==
On May 2, 1804, John Floyd was commissioned Captain of the 31st Militia in Camden County, Georgia. Two years later, on June 26, 1806, he was commissioned Brigadier-General, First Brigade of Georgia Militia. At the beginning of the War of 1812, General Floyd commanded a force at Point Peter near St. Marys in Camden County. Georgia had been the last state to join the American revolutionary forces, and many Tories left afterward for Florida, and hoped to return. Former Georgia governor and General George Mathews, as a special agent during the Patriot War, asked Floyd to hold his militia ready to help overthrow the Spanish government in East Florida. Even though the U.S. government feared Britain would capture Florida, Floyd opposed invading Florida and wrote Georgia Governor David Mitchell questioning the request's propriety. President Madison disowned Mathew's conquest of Fernandina island, and General Mathews died on August 30, 1812, in Augusta, Georgia en route to Washington to defend his actions.

=== Paramilitary operations in Florida ===
Nonetheless, in October 1812, Floyd, along with about 120 volunteers, reached New Camp Hope in East Florida. Florida's Spanish Governor worked with the Seminoles and enlisted them to fight rebels as well as these invaders. Floyd wanted a fast and decisive strike, countering the Indians with a devastating blow. Difficulties arose. Military supplies ran short, food was scarce, his men came down with dysentery and fever. His pessimistic militia troops resisted the expedition, and ultimately, the attack never materialized. If the Patriots had succeeded, General John Floyd might have become Governor of territorial Florida. President James Madison had requested acceptable names to fill the position and General Mathews recommended General John Floyd as "most acceptable".

=== Beginning of military operations against British-allied Creeks ===
The Creek Indians, who allied themselves with the British forces, began attacks on white settlements in eastern and central Alabama and western Georgia. Indians from the Upper Creek Towns, known as Red Sticks, who resented the encroachment onto their lands, sought aggressively to reduce influences upon their tribal unions and wished to return their society to a traditional way of life in culture and religion. In September 1813, in response to the threats and to quell the Red Stick rebellion, General John Floyd was ordered to command Federal troops who were assembled at Camp Hope on the Ocmulgee River. These forces constructed forts in a defensive line along the Federal Road from the Ocmulgee River to the Alabama River. A stronghold, Fort Mitchell, was erected on the west bank of the Chattahoochee River.

=== Raid on Autosee ===
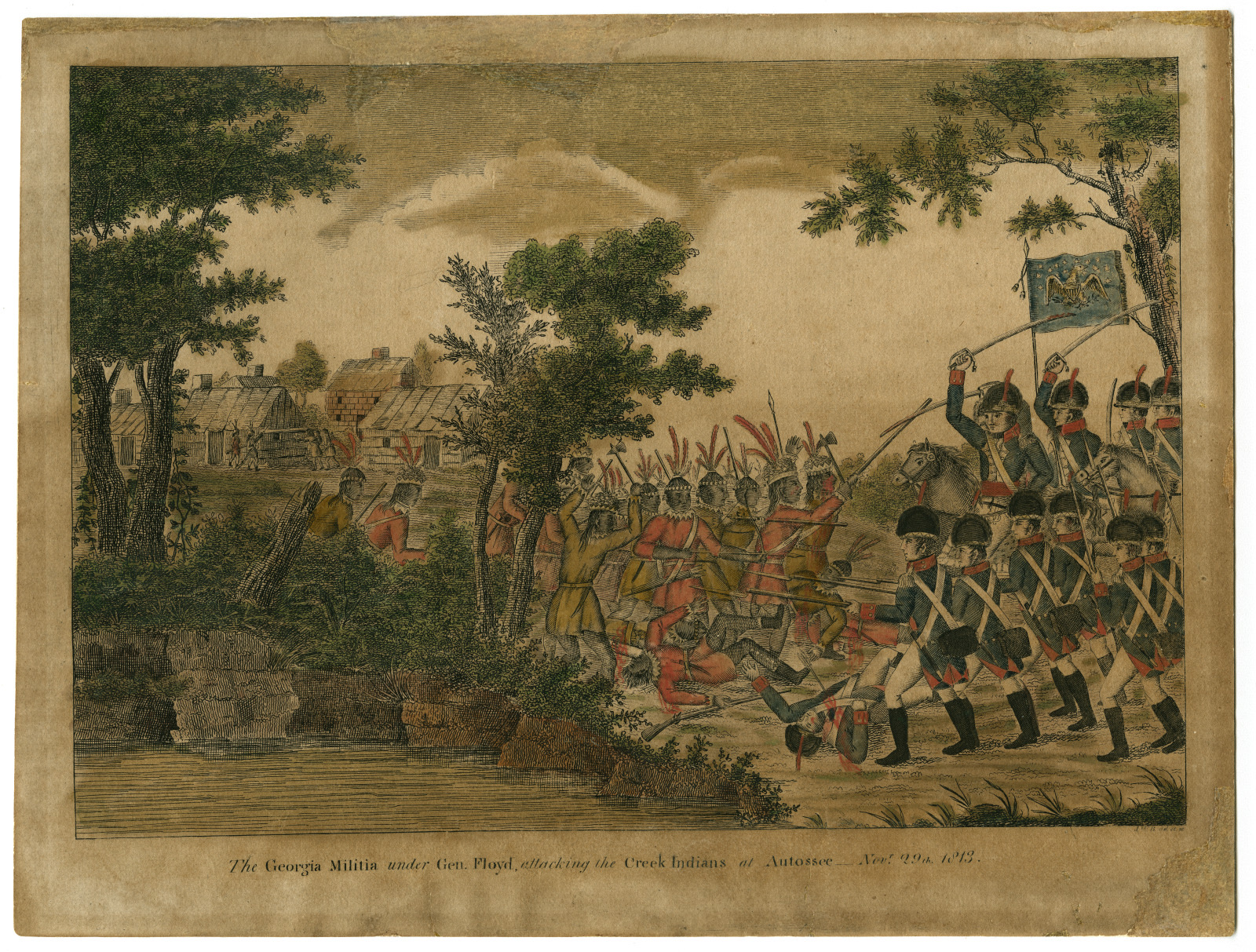
"Georgia Militia under Gen. Floyd, attacking the Creek Indians at Autossee" (The Historic New Orleans Collection MSS 557.9.166)

In November 1813, Floyd and his men waged an overwhelming offensive, the Battle of Autossee. Autossee was located on the east bank of the Tallapoosa River and was one of the most populated towns of the Creek Nation. The men were to strike at daybreak and encircle the town, thereby blocking the Indians’ escape. Scouts discovered a second town just a few yards downstream, forcing Floyd to change tactics and divide his regiments. The attacks by both sides were fierce but the Red Sticks suffered the greatest casualties. Indian men, women and children were shot, stabbed by bayonets, bombarded with volleys of fire, and burned to death in their own houses. Both Indian villages were completely destroyed. Charles Rinaldo Floyd, who at age sixteen accompanied his father, later described at the battle's aftermath: "The Indians never repair the desolation of a town; so Autossee has been deserted ever since the battle, except by wolves and ravens; and the skeletons of the slain are still bleaching amidst the ruins". General Floyd sustained a serious wound to his knee during the battle. He recuperated over the Christmas holidays at Fort Mitchell.

=== Battle of Calebee Creek ===
In early January 1814, General Floyd, having replenished rations, firearms and artillery, marched with 1500 men via the Federal Road deep into Creek territory. About forty miles west of Fort Mitchell, they constructed Fort Hull as a supply base. He and his troops advanced to Calabee (Chalibee) Creek where they constructed a fortified camp, Camp Defiance. On January 27, 1814, over 1300 Indian warriors attacked at dawn on the banks of Calabee (Chalibee) Creek in what became known as the Battle of Calebee Creek. If friendly Lower Creek Indians (who had allied themselves with the white state militias) had not warned them, and the veteran companies had not acted quickly, General Floyd might have lost this brutal battle. His campaigns to subdue the hostile Upper Creek and Choctaw Indians were so effective, he was promoted to the rank of Major-General.

=== The war’s near ending ===
At the close of the war (1814-1815), Floyd was sent to defend Savannah against the presumed British attack. Because coastal Georgia plantations were defenseless against invaders he requested that his family temporarily move to Savannah. Thus, he was not in charge of the Ft. Patrick defenses when British raiders led by Capt. George Cockburn captured it in January 1815, sacked St. Mary's and raided coastal plantations.

== Political career ==
General John Floyd was one of three men appointed to survey the Georgia-Florida line. He was chairman of the committee who reported the survey results to the Executive Committee in Washington, D.C. Floyd supported former General Andrew Jackson and was one of the presidential electors for US President in 1829. While still a United States Congressman that March, Floyd attended the President Jackson's inauguration.

A slaveholder and firm believer in slavery, Floyd helped found and a lead the States Rights Party of Georgia. For several years he served as a Justice of Inferior Court of Camden County.

From 1820 to 1826, Floyd represented Camden County in the Georgia House of Representatives. From March 4, 1827, to March 3, 1829, he served as a member of the United States House of Representatives.

== Death and legacy ==
Brigadier-General John Floyd died June 24, 1839, at Bellevue Plantation. His parents predeceased him. All three are buried at the Floyd Family Cemetery with gravestones. His wife, Isabella Maria Hazzard Floyd, died at Bellevue Plantation on August 18, 1859. Although buried there, her grave is unmarked. His son Charles Rinaldo Floyd survived his father by six years and would be buried wrapped in a U.S. flag at Fairview Plantation as he wished (as discussed herein).

The Floyd Family Cemetery is located on Floyd’s Neck about a quarter of a mile away from the former Fairfield mansion . It sits on high ground not far from a bend in Floyd's Creek, noted on maps as Fairfield Point. Enclosed by a low rectangular brick wall, secured by a small wrought iron entry gate, nine visible gravestones and over fifteen unmarked graves lie in seclusion under a thick canopy of moss-draped trees.

=== Last will and testament ===
In 1839 the will of Brigadier-General John Floyd was probated in Camden County Georgia Inferior Court. Charles Rinaldo Floyd, Richard Ferdinand Floyd and Everard Hamilton qualified as Executors. General John Floyd wrote it in 1833, six years before his death. He bequeathed his lands, including Bellevue Plantation, a few slaves, out buildings, tenements, appurtenances, all physical property, including the townhouses owned in St. Marys, cash and bonds, to his wife, Isabella Maria Floyd, with the proviso that nothing was to be sold during her lifetime unless it was for payment of debts, and after her death, all property would revert into the Estate. General Floyd directed bequests to his heirs, all of his living children, also with a proviso that should a difference of opinion arise, contrary to his wishes or intentions, the disagreeing parties shall call in an umpire whose final decision would be binding. (Fairfield Plantation had long before been given to Charles Rinaldo Floyd; Richard Ferdinand Floyd lived at The Hermitage; Sarah Catherine Wigg Floyd and her husband, Dr. Aime DeLaroche, lived at Black Point). His remaining Estate was then divided; the slaves were equally allotted and not to be transferred out of the family; his war and hunting weapons were to be equally distributed among his sons.

=== Family plantations destroyed ===
The Floyds sympathized with the Confederacy during the American Civil War, and one son, Richard Ferdinand Floyd became a general in the Florida militia (defending Apalachicola and Amelia Island) and then received an infantry commission as colonel and led troops at the Second Battle of Bull Run. He missed the Battle of Sharpsburg and was permitted to resign because of health and returned home in late 1862. Various raiding parties of the 54th Massachusetts sent ashore from a blockading Union vessel anchored in St. Andrew Sound destroyed both Fairfield and Bellevue, including the outbuildings.

Not a trace of Fairfield mansion remains, after wartime devastation, hurricanes and floods. The Charles Rinaldo Floyd Monument stands alone at the former Fairfield Plantation site. Soldiers who served under him during the Indian wars erected the marble obelisk. Only tabby concrete ruins remain of Bellevue, which his brother Samuel Floyd sold to a former slave after the American Civil War.

The end of the plantation economy meant the decline of several towns prosperous in Floyd's lifetime, including Jeffersonton (removed as county seat circa 1870 as St. Marys had the railroad connection) and Cabin Bluff. In the 1920s, thousands of acres near the Cumberland River and Cabin Bluff became hunting lodge which hosted celebrity hunters from across the world, including President Calvin Coolidge, and which has recently been renovated and opened to the public.

=== Other memorials ===
Floyd County, Georgia was named to honor Floyd. Also, before it was extended, a portion of Abercorn Street in Savannah was named Floyd Street to recognize his contribution to the city's defenses in 1815.

U.S. House of Representatives
Preceded by At Large districts	Member of the U.S. House of Representatives from Georgia's 7th congressional district March 4, 1827 – March 3, 1829	Succeeded by At Large districts
