= 46th Ohio Infantry Regiment =

- Active: October 16, 1861, to July 22, 1865
- Country: United States
- Allegiance: Union
- Branch: Union Army
- Type: Infantry
- Engagements: Battle of Shiloh; Siege of Corinth; Siege of Vicksburg; Siege of Jackson; Chattanooga campaign; Battle of Missionary Ridge; Atlanta campaign; Battle of Resaca; Battle of Dallas; Battle of New Hope Church; Battle of Noonday Creek; Battle of Allatoona; Battle of Kennesaw Mountain; Battle of Atlanta; Siege of Atlanta; Battle of Jonesborough; Battle of Lovejoy's Station; Sherman's March to the Sea; Carolinas campaign; Battle of Bentonville

The 46th Ohio Infantry Regiment was an infantry regiment in the Union Army during the American Civil War. The 46th was armed rather differently from most infantry regiments in the Civil War. In March 1864 many of the regiment's men re-enlisted as the 46th Ohio Veteran Infantry Regiment and received a 30-day furlough. Upon return to its encampment at Scottsboro, Alabama, in April 1864, the regiment exchanged its muzzleloading rifle-muskets for the Spencer repeating rifle. The colonel of the 46th Ohio, Charles C. Walcutt, wrote a manual of arms for the Spencer, and the regiment first employed its Spencers in force at the Battle of Resaca.

== Service ==
The 46th Ohio Infantry Regiment was organized in Worthington, Ohio October 16, 1861, through January 28, 1862, and mustered in for three years service under the command of Colonel Thomas Worthington.

The regiment was attached to District of Paducah, Kentucky, to March 1862. 1st Brigade, 5th Division, Army of the Tennessee, to May 1862. 2nd Brigade, 5th Division, Army of the Tennessee, to July 1862. 2nd Brigade, 5th Division, District of Memphis, Tennessee, to November 1862. 2nd Brigade, 5th Division, Right Wing, XIII Corps, Department of the Tennessee, November 1862. 1st Brigade, 1st Division, District of Memphis, Tennessee, XIII Corps, to December 1862. 1st Brigade, 1st Division, XVII Corps, to January 1863. 1st Brigade, 1st Division, XVI Corps, to March 1863. 2nd Brigade, 1st Division, XVI Corps, to July 1863. 2nd Brigade, 4th Division, XVI Corps, to September 1864. 2nd Brigade, 1st Division, XV Corps, to July 1865.

The 46th Ohio Infantry mustered out of service at Louisville, Kentucky, on July 22, 1865.

== Detailed service ==
At Camp Chase, Ohio, until February 18, 1862. Ordered to Paducah, Ky., February 18. Moved to Savannah, Tenn., March 6–10, 1862. Expedition to Yellow Creek, Miss., and occupation of Pittsburg Landing, Tenn., March 14–17. Battle of Shiloh, Tenn., April 6–7. Duty at Pittsburg Landing until April 27. Advance on and siege of Corinth, Miss., April 29-May 30. March to Memphis, Tenn., via LaGrange, Grand Junction, and Holly Springs June 1-July 2. Guard duty along Memphis & Charleston Railroad and provost duty at Memphis, Tenn., until November. Affair at Randolph September 25. Grant's Central Mississippi Campaign. Operations on the Mississippi Central Railroad November 1862 to January 10, 1863. Guard duty along Memphis & Charleston Railroad, and scout duty in northern Mississippi until June 8. Ordered to Vicksburg, Miss., June 8. Siege of Vicksburg, Miss., June 11-July 4. Advance on Jackson, Miss., July 4–10. Bolton's Ferry July 4–6. Siege of Jackson July 10–17. Camp at Big Black until September 25. Moved to Memphis, then marched to Chattanooga, Tenn., September 25-November 20. Operations on Memphis & Charleston Railroad in Alabama October 20–29. Paint Rock, Ala., November 20. Chattanooga-Ringgold Campaign November 23–27. Tunnel Hill November 23–24. Missionary Ridge November 25. Pursuit to Graysville November 26–27. March to relief of Knoxville, Tenn., November 28-December 8. Duty at Scottsboro, Ala., December 31, 1863, to May 1, 1864. Atlanta Campaign May 1-September 8. Demonstrations on Resaca May 8–13. Near Resaca May 13. Battle of Resaca May 14–15. Advance on Dallas May 18–25. Operations on line of Pumpkin Vine Creek and battles about Dallas, New Hope Church, and Allatoona Hills May 25-June 5. Operations about Marietta and against Kennesaw Mountain June 10-July 2. Assault on Kennesaw June 27. Nickajack Creek July 2–5. Chattahoochie River July 6–17. Battle of Atlanta July 22. Siege of Atlanta July 22-August 25. Ezra Chapel, Hood's 2nd Sortie, July 28. Flank movement on Jonesborough August 25–30. Battle of Jonesborough August 31-September 1. Lovejoy's Station September 2–6. Operations against Hood in northern Georgia and northern Alabama September 29-November 3. Rome October 17. March to the sea November 15-December 10. Griswoldsville November 22. Siege of Savannah December 10–21. Campaign of the Carolinas January to April 1865. Reconnaissance to Salkehatchie River, S.C., January 25. Salkehatchie Swamp February 2–5. South Edisto River February 9. North Edisto River February 11–12. Congaree and Savannah Creeks February 15. Columbia February 16–17. Battle of Bentonville, N.C., March 20–21. Mill Creek March 22. Occupation of Goldsboro March 24. Advance on Raleigh April 10–14. Occupation of Raleigh April 14. Bennett's House April 26. Surrender of Johnston and his army. March to Washington, D.C., via Richmond, Va., April 29-May 20. Grand Review of the Armies May 24. Moved to Louisville, Ky., June, and duty there until July.

== Casualties ==
The regiment lost a total of 290 men during service; 10 officers and 124 enlisted men killed or mortally wounded, 7 officers and 149 enlisted men died of disease.

== Commanders ==
- Colonel Thomas Worthington
- Colonel Charles Carroll Walcutt

== Notable members ==
- Corporal Harry Clay Davis, Company G - Medal of Honor recipient for action during the siege of Atlanta, July 28, 1864; he captured the flag of the 30th Louisiana Infantry
- Major Henry H. Giesy - Brevet Brigadier General
- Private James K. Sturgeon, Company F - Medal of Honor recipient for action at the Battle of Kennesaw Mountain

== See also ==
- List of Ohio Civil War units
- Ohio in the Civil War
