= Philip H. Bruck =

American politician

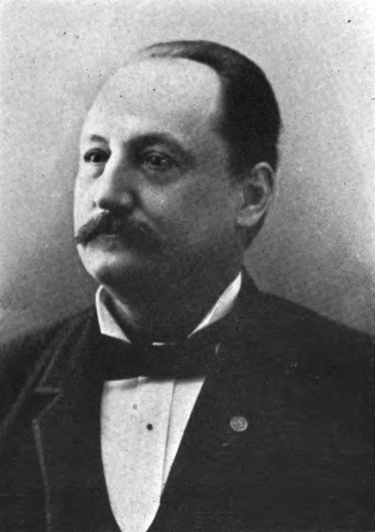

29th Mayor of Columbus
- In office 1887–1890
- Preceded by: Charles C. Walcutt
- Succeeded by: George J. Karb

Personal details
- Born: January 6, 1845 Columbus, Ohio, US
- Died: January 6, 1920 (aged 75) Hudson, Ohio, US
- Resting place: Green Lawn Cemetery, Columbus, Ohio
- Party: Democratic
- Spouse: Mary Lennox
- Children: J. Philip; James; Mary; Beatrice
- Education: Central High School
- Profession: Mayor; City Council Member; Druggist; Board of Education Member; Ohio Representative

Philip H. Bruck (January 6, 1845 – January 6, 1920) was the 29th mayor of Columbus, Ohio and the 26th person to serve in that office. He served Columbus for two consecutive terms. His successor, George J. Karb, took office in 1897. He died in 1920.

Political offices
Preceded by Charles C. Walcutt	Mayor of Columbus, Ohio; 1887–1890	Succeeded by George J. Karb
