= Shoddy millionaires =

"Shoddy" millionaires was a derogatory term for the war profiteers in the North during the American Civil War. Allegedly, they supplied the Union army with faulty uniforms made from reprocessed shoddy rather than virgin wool.

Shoddy millionaires also allegedly made shoes from cardboard or wood chips that would dissolve when the soldiers marched in water or mud.
