= Battle of Griswoldville =

1864 battle in the American Civil War

- Part of the Sherman's March to the Sea of the American Civil War
Date	November 22, 1864
Location	Griswoldville, Georgia in Jones County, Georgia 32°52′10″N 83°27′36″W
Result	Union victory

Belligerents
United States (Union)	(Confederate States of America) Confederate States (Confederacy)

Commanders and leaders
Charles C. Walcutt; Charles R. Woods	Joseph Wheeler; Pleasant J. Philips

Strength
3,000	2,300

Casualties and losses
94 total, 13 dead, 79 wounded, 2 captured	523 total, 51 dead, 472 wounded The Daily Constitutionalist (Augusta, GA, December 6, 1864) reported a loss of 614 killed, wounded and missing.

The Battle of Griswoldville was the first battle of Sherman's March to the Sea, fought November 22, 1864, during the American Civil War. A Union Army brigade under Brig. Gen. Charles C. Walcutt fought three brigades of Georgia militia under Brig. Gen. Pleasant J. Philips, at Griswoldville (an industrial town), near Macon, Georgia, and continued its march toward Savannah.

== Background ==
Sherman, victorious in the lengthy Atlanta campaign, had refitted his army and recently departed from Atlanta on a march designed to reach the Atlantic Coast at Savannah. The right wing of Sherman's force was the Army of the Tennessee, commanded by Maj. Gen. Oliver Otis Howard. It encountered the first resistance to its march in Griswoldville. Walcutt was ordered to make a demonstration with his brigade (2nd Brigade, 1st Division, XV Corps) of six infantry regiments and one artillery battery (Battery B, 1st Michigan), toward Macon to ascertain the disposition of enemy troops in that direction. Union cavalry under Brig. Gen. Hugh Judson Kilpatrick had struck Griswoldville on November 21, capturing a train of 13 cars loaded with military supplies, and burning the station and some factory buildings.

== Battle ==
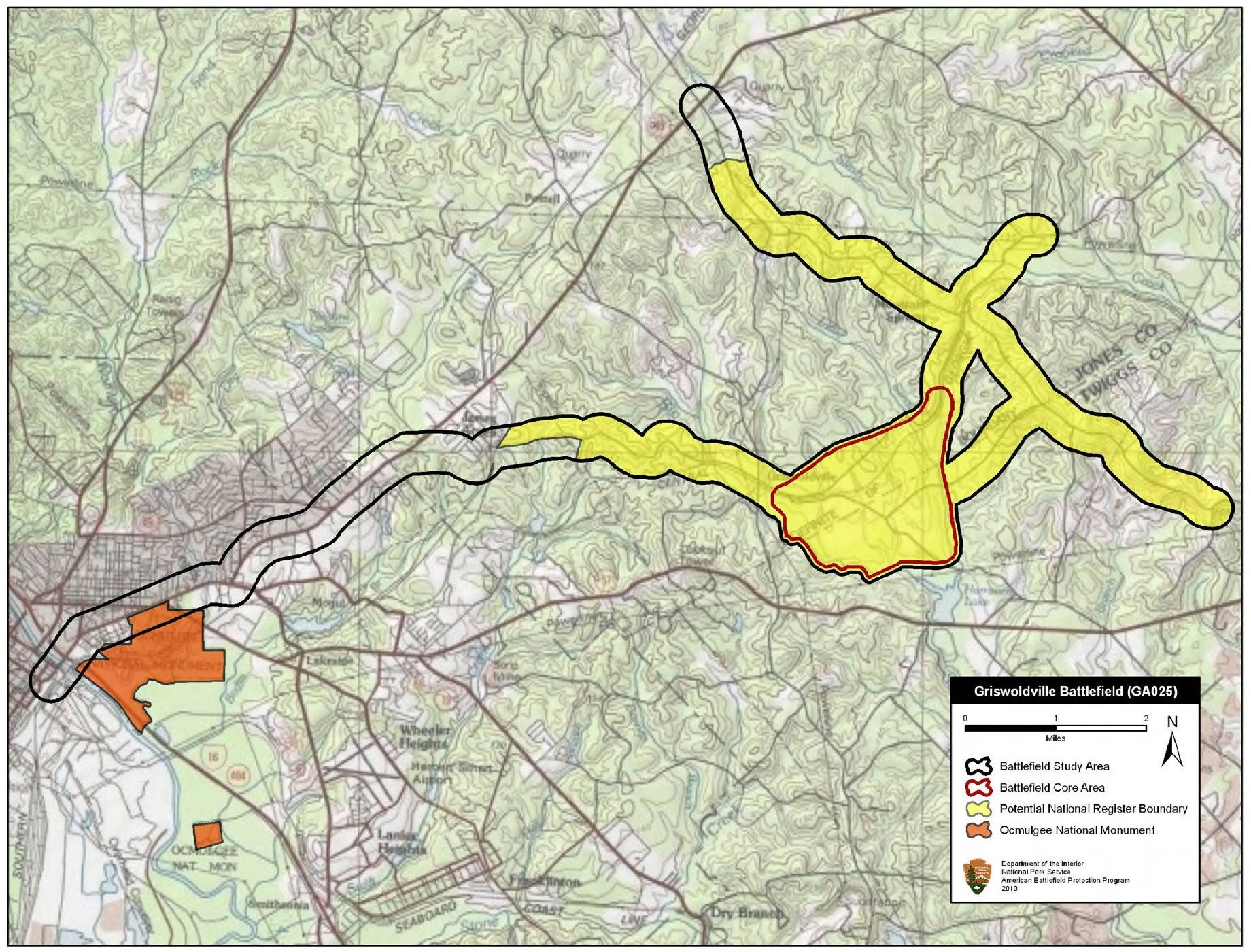
Map of Griswoldville Battlefield core and study areas by the American Battlefield Protection Program

Early on November 22, a detachment of Confederate cavalry under Maj. Gen. Joseph Wheeler attacked the 9th Pennsylvania Cavalry on the Gordon Road, killing one man, wounding two, and capturing eighteen. The 9th then charged the Confederates and drove them back nearly a mile across a creek, where the enemy was found in force, posted in order of battle. The Confederates advanced and drove in the Union skirmishers, but the 9th Pennsylvania and 5th Kentucky Cavalry made a saber charge that forced the Confederates to retire to their works. At this point, Walcutt's infantry brigade and artillery battery joined the cavalry.

Walcutt threw out a strong skirmish line that drove the Confederates back through Griswoldville, after which, by orders of division commander Brig. Gen. Charles R. Woods, he fell back to the Duncan farm and took up a position on the edge of the woods, with an open field in his front and his flanks protected by a swamp. Here he threw up a barricade of rails and logs and a battery of artillery was also brought up. About 2 p.m., three brigades of Georgia militia under the command of Brig. Gen. Pleasant J. Philips attacked. The Georgia Militia had been ordered from Macon to Augusta, thinking the latter was Sherman’s next objective, and only accidentally collided with Walcutt's force.

The militia advanced in three compact lines, but were met by a shower of canister. They succeeded, however, in reaching a ravine about 75 yards from Walcutt's works, where they reformed their lines and from which they made three desperate charges on the Federal position, all repulsed with heavy losses. The militia then tried to turn the Federal flanks, but finding these well protected by cavalry, retired to the ravine, remained there until dark, and then withdrew from the field. General Walcutt was wounded early in the engagement, and brigade command fell to Col. Robert Francis Catterson of the 97th Regiment Indiana Infantry.

== Aftermath ==
The Union losses were 13 killed, 79 wounded, and two missing. Confederate losses are estimated at 51 dead and 472 wounded. General William Tecumseh Sherman's march to the sea continued.

After the Civil War, this industrial community of Griswoldville—a source for Confederate military supplies during the war—was not rebuilt.

== Preservation ==
The American Battlefield Trust and its partners have saved a 17-acre tract of the battlefield on Baker Road near Little Sandy Creek. It is managed by Georgia State Parks. A roadside monument and interpretive wayside markers are at the site on Baker Road near the intersection with Griswoldville Road.

== General references ==
- National Park Service battle description
- Eicher, David J. The Longest Night: A Military History of the Civil War. New York: Simon & Schuster, 2001. ISBN 0-684-84944-5.
- Scaife, William Robert and Bragg, William Harris, Joe Brown's Pets: The Georgia Militia, 1861-1865. Mercer University Press, 2004.
