= Georgia Militia =

Military unit (1733–1879)

The Georgia Militia existed from 1733 to 1879. It was originally planned by General James Oglethorpe before the founding of the Province of Georgia, the Crown colony that would become the U.S. state of Georgia. One reason for the founding of the colony was to act as a buffer between the Spanish settlements in Florida and the British colonies to the north. For background with respect to the region's Native Americans, see the Yamasee War (1715–1717) and Cherokee–American wars (1776–1795).

Gordon Smith states, "'ante-bellum' Georgia was in an almost constant swirl of 'war or rumors of war'" due to the presence of Tories, Indians, bandits, privateers, and border disputes with France and Spain. "Central to the American concept of a republican democracy, composed as it was of citizen-soldiers, the militia system was essential to the political and social structure. The basic building blocks at the bottom of the Georgia Militia pyramid were the general militia districts. Formally established pursuant to the Militia Act of 1784, these theoretically contained one company of at least sixty-three men … the governor as commander-in-chief. ... "The General Militia Acts of 1803, 1807, and 1818 directed that all district male residents from eighteen to forty-five years old, except those exempted by laws such as ministers, enrol in their district company and perform regularly scheduled drills, at the designated unit muster ground." Campaigns included the War of Jenkins' Ear, 1737-1748, American Revolutionary War, 1775–1783, the Oconee Wars, 1787–1797, The Embargo Wars, 1807–1812, the War of 1812, 1812–1815, the First Seminole War, 1817–1819, the Second Seminole War, 1835–1843, the Creek War of 1836, 1836–1837, the Cherokee Disturbances and Cherokee Removal, 1836–1838, and the Mexican–American War, 1846–1848.

Three brigades of militia under the command of Brigadier General Pleasant J. Philips engaged U.S. forces on November 22, 1864, near Macon, Georgia, in the Battle of Griswoldville, the first battle of Sherman's March to the Sea. On April 16, 1865, in response to Wilson's Raid through Alabama, militia forces under the command of Brigadier General Robert C. Tyler engaged U.S. soldiers at the Battle of West Point. The desperate Battle of Columbus (1865), fought the same day, would prove to be one of the last battles of the American Civil War east of the Mississippi River.

== Notable generals ==
- George T. Anderson, 11th Division, 1848–1850.
- Allen S. Cutts, 2nd Brigade, 1861, future mayor of Americus.
- Allen Daniel Jr., (1807 -1817) Promoted to Major General of the 4th Division on November 9, 1812. Speaker of the Georgia House of Representatives (1822), State Senator, namesake of Danielsville and Fort Daniel (1813)
- Robert Milner Echols, 11th Division, 1833.
- Samuel Elbert, 1782, Georgia State Navy, future governor.
- William Ezzard, 1st Brigade of the 11th Division, 1830–1840, future mayor of Atlanta.
- Charles Rinaldo Floyd, 1st Brigade of the 1st Division, 1829.
- John Floyd (Georgia politician), 1st Brigade of 1st Division and then 1st Division, 1806–1829, future US Representative, and father of Charles Rinaldo Floyd.
- Ira Roe Foster, 2nd Brigade of the 7th Division, 1845–1851.
- Thomas Glascock (I), 1st Brigade of the 2nd Division, 1792, and father of Thomas Glascock (II).
- Thomas Glascock (II), 1st Brigade of the 2nd Division, 1816–1822, future US Representative.
- James Gunn (senator), 1st Brigade of the 1st Division, 1792–1801, future US Senator.
- Hugh A. Haralson, 9th Division, 1838, future US Representative, and father-in-law of John Brown Gordon.
- Jeptha Vining Harris, promoted to major general of the 4th Division on November 9, 1829, resigning his commission in 1845.
- George Paul Harrison Sr., 1st Brigade, 1856–1861.
- Jared Irwin, 2nd Brigade of the 2nd Division, 1792, future governor.
- James Jackson (politician), 1st Brigade, 1786, future US Representative, US Senator, and governor.
- David Meriwether, 3rd Division, September 21, 1797 commission, future Speaker of the Georgia House of Representatives
- David Brydie Mitchell, 1st Brigade of the 1st Division, 1803, future mayor of Savannah and governor.
- Daniel Newnan, 3rd Division, 1817–1825, future US Representative.
- John C. Nicholls, 2nd Brigade of the 6th Division, 1861, future US Representative.
- Charles Phillips, 1st Brigade of the 5th Division, 1825–1828. Member of the Georgia House of Representatives in 1821 and 1822 and the Georgia Senate in 1823. General Phillips and his wife, Anne (Nicks) Phillips, were the parents of Pleasant J. Philips and Elizabeth Y. Phillips. Elizabeth married Colonel Reuben J. Crews in 1828, and their first child was C.C. Crews.
- John W. A. Sanford, 3rd Division, 1832–1850, future US Representative.
- Paul Jones Semmes, 1st Brigade of the 4th Division, 1837-1840.
- Daniel Stewart
- Benjamin Taliaferro, 3rd Division, 1795, future US Representative.
- Josiah Tattnall, 1st Regiment, 1801, future US Senator and governor.
- Jett Thomas, 3rd Division, 1816.
- Wiley Thompson, 4th Division, 1817, future US Representative.

== See also ==
- Georgia Naval Militia
- Goober Peas
- Militia (United States)
- Militia Act of 1903
- Second Amendment to the United States Constitution
- List of United States militia units in the American Revolutionary War
