= Charles R. Woods =

Union General of the American Civil War

Charles Robert Woods
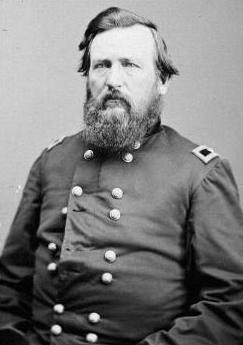
- Brig. Gen. Charles Robert Woods
- Born: February 19, 1827; Newark, Ohio, U.S.
- Died: February 26, 1885 (aged 58); Newark, Ohio, U.S.
- Burial place: Cedar Hill Cemetery; Newark, Ohio, U.S.
- Military career
- Allegiance: United States of America; Union
- Branch: United States Army; Union Army
- Service years: 1852–1874
- Rank: Brigadier General; Brevet Major General
- Commands: 76th Ohio Infantry; 1st Bde., 1st Div., XV Corps; 1st Division, XV Corps; 2nd U.S. Infantry
- Conflicts: American Civil War; Siege of Vicksburg; Third Battle of Chattanooga; Battle of Ringgold Gap; Atlanta campaign; Battle of Griswoldville; Battle of Bentonville

Charles Robert Woods (February 19, 1827 – February 26, 1885) was a career United States Army officer and a Union general during the American Civil War. He is noted for commanding the relief troops that first attempted to resupply Fort Sumter prior to the start of the conflict, and served with distinction during the war.

== Early life and career ==
Charles Woods was born in the city of Newark in Licking County, Ohio, the younger brother of William Burnham Woods and the brother-in-law of Willard Warner, both future Union generals. He grew up on his family's farm in Ohio, where he received a minimal education from tutoring.

Woods entered the United States Military Academy at West Point in July 1848, and graduated four years later, standing 20th out of 43 cadets. He was appointed a brevet second lieutenant on July 1, 1852, and ordered to join the 1st U.S. Infantry Regiment. On July 31 of that year Woods was promoted to the rank of second lieutenant. During 1855 he was transferred to the 9th U.S. Infantry as of March 3, and was promoted to first lieutenant on October 16. Woods' pre-war military career consisted of "routine duty" in Texas as well as in the Washington Territory until 1860.

== Civil War service ==
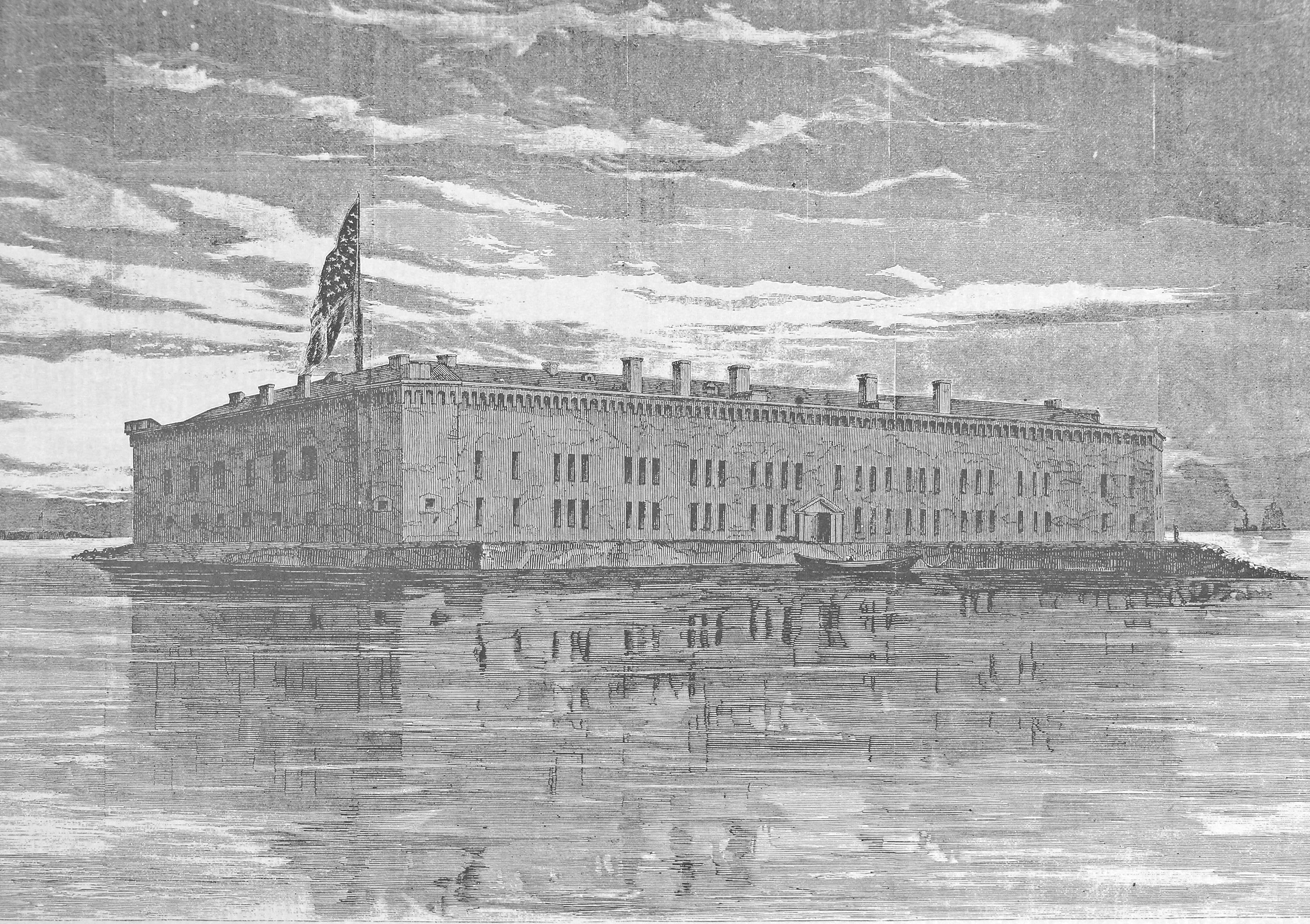
Fort Sumter in 1861

In early 1861, Woods was ordered by the U.S. Army to lead reinforcements to Fort Sumter, located in Charleston Harbor, South Carolina. On January 5 his command of 200 officers and men left from Governors Island in New York Harbor aboard the steamer SS Star of the West, escorted by the sloop USS Brooklyn, for Fort Sumter.

On January 8 at dark Woods arrived off Charleston Harbor, and when it was light enough on January 9 they entered the bay. Woods and the steamer weren't fired upon until they arrived within one and three-quarter miles (about three kilometers) of both Sumter and Fort Moultrie, when they were fired on by an artillery battery near the northern end of Morris Island. Woods described in his report what occurred next:

We kept on, still under the fire of the battery, most of the balls passing over us, one just missing the machinery, another striking but a few feet from the rudder, while a ricochet shot struck us in the fore-chains, about two feet above the water line... The American flag Was flying at Fort Sumter, but we saw no flag at Fort Moultrie, and there were no guns fired from either of these fortifications. Finding it impossible to take my command to Fort Sumter, I was obliged most reluctantly to turn about, and try to make my way out of the harbor before my retreat should be cut off by vessels then in sight...

Woods and the Star of the West returned to New York Harbor on January 12, 1861, and he filed his full report the next day from Fort Columbus. On April 1 he was promoted to the rank of captain, and on October 13 he was given command of the 76th Ohio Infantry Regiment with the rank of colonel. Woods' first assignment with his regiment was briefly in what is now West Virginia in the fall of 1861.

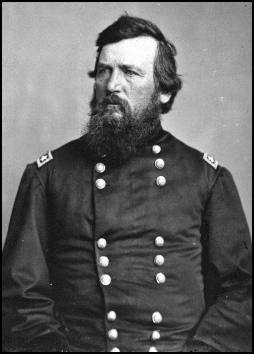
Woods as a Union Army brevet major general

In 1862, Woods began his Western Theater service. His regiment participated in the capture of Fort Donelson in Tennessee on February 16, 1862, as well as the Battle of Shiloh on April 6. Woods was promoted to brigade command, replacing Charles Whittlesey in the Army of the Tennessee shortly before the Siege of Corinth on April 29, which lasted until June 10. He then took charge of his prior regiment during the Battle of Chickasaw Bayou that December. Woods fought well during rest of the Vicksburg Campaign and the Siege of Vicksburg, and for his performance during the siege Woods was appointed a brevet lieutenant colonel in the Regular Army as of July 4, 1863.

Woods fought with distinction at the Third Battle of Chattanooga in November 1863, and was made a brevet colonel in the Regular Army as of November 24 for his efforts there. He was promoted to the rank of brigadier general in the Union Army on August 4, and by January 1864 was given divisional command. He was promoted to major in the Regular Army in the 18th U.S. Infantry on April 20, 1864, and was appointed a brevet major general in the Union Army for his actions during the Battle of Griswoldville on November 22, the first engagement of Sherman's March to the Sea. Woods was then appointed a regular brevet brigadier general and quickly then to brevet major general on March 13, 1865, both in the Regular Army.

== Postbellum ==
Woods chose to continue his military career and remain in the U.S. Army after the end of the American Civil War. He was assigned to command the Department of Alabama from June 27, 1865, to May 19, 1866, and then commanded the Department of the South until August 6. He was promoted in the Regular Army to lieutenant colonel on July 28 in the 33rd U.S. Infantry, and was mustered out of the volunteer service on September 1.

On September 24, 1866, Woods was transferred to the 27th U.S. Infantry, lasting until March 15, 1869, when he was unassigned for 19 days. On March 24 he was assigned to the 5th U.S. Infantry, and on February 18, 1874, he was promoted to colonel and given command of the 2nd U.S. Infantry. He held this post until retiring on December 15 due to his failing health.

Woods died at the age of 58 at his estate named "Woodside" in Newark, Ohio. He was buried there in Cedar Hill Cemetery, as would be his brother and brother-in-law.

== See also ==
- List of American Civil War generals (Union)
