= War profiteering =

Person or company profiteering from war or conflict

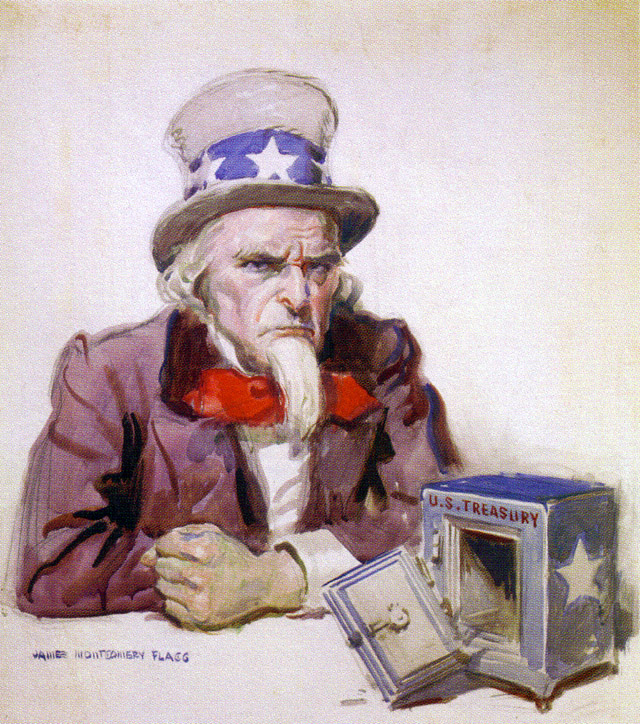
"Uncle Sam with Empty Treasury" illustration following World War I

A war profiteer is any individual or organization that earns excessive or unethical profit from warfare or by selling weapons, supplies, or services to parties engaged in conflict. The term typically carries strong negative connotations and is often associated with exploitation during times of national crisis. More broadly profiteering, making a profit, criticized as excessive or unreasonable, also occurs in peacetime. An example of war profiteers were the shoddy millionaires of the American Civil War, who allegedly sold recycled wool and cardboard-soled shoes to soldiers, prioritizing profit over quality and safety.

US Congress have argued that major modern defense conglomerates including Lockheed Martin, Mitsubishi, Boeing, BAE Systems, General Dynamics, and RTX Corporation fit the description in the post-9/11 era. This argument is based in the political influence of the defense industry, for example in 2010 the US defense industry spent $144 million on lobbying the US government and donated over $22.6 million to congressional candidates, as well as large profits for defense company shareholders in the post-9/11 period.

== History ==
=== American Revolution ===
There were several food riots during the American Revolutionary War against profiteering merchants, more than thirty between 1776 and 1779. In 1777, a mob of Bostonian women beat the merchant Thomas Boylston and confiscated his stock of goods for hoarding coffee and sugar to drive up their prices. In East Hartford, Connecticut, a mob of twenty women and three men took 218 lbs of sugar from a merchant named Pitkin. In Beverly, Massachusetts, a mob of 60 women and some men forced local merchants to charge the same price for sugar in American paper money and gold coin.

=== Industrial Revolution ===
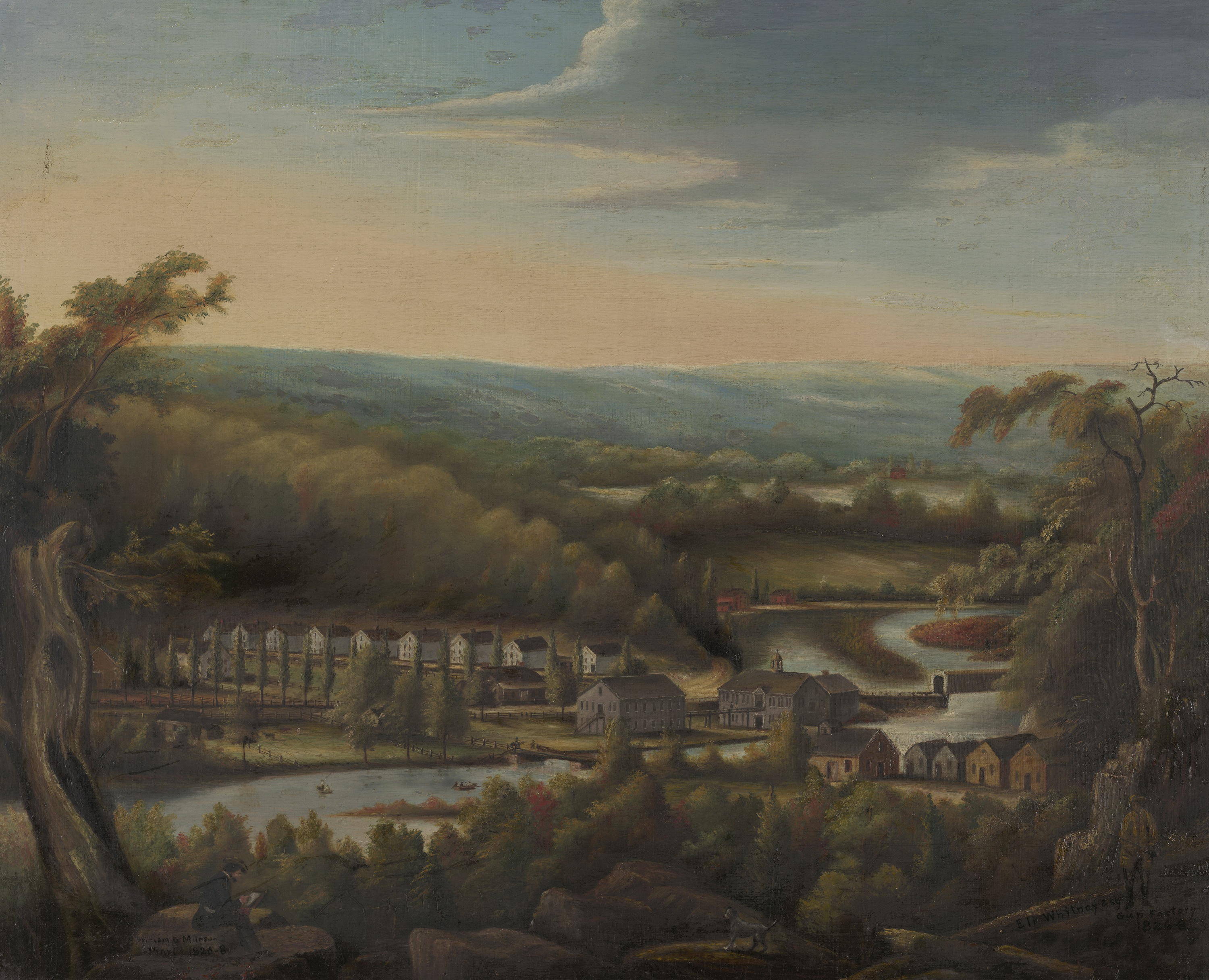
Whitney's gun factory in 1827

In 1798, American inventor Eli Whitney received a government contract to manufacture 10,000 muskets in less than two years. After failing to produce a single musket, he was called to Washington to defend his expenditure of the treasury funds before a committee that included both John Adams and Thomas Jefferson. Believing to demonstrate the ingenuity of interchangeable parts, Whitney earned widespread support and has been incorrectly credited with inventing the idea of interchangeable parts. However Merritt Roe Smith concluded that this demonstration was staged by marking the parts beforehand, so they were not as interchangeable as he made them seem. Eventually Whitney was able to accomplish his goal of 10,000 muskets with interchangeable parts at a relatively low cost in the next eight years, and later produced more than 15,000 in the four years after that.

== Contemporary manufacturing ==
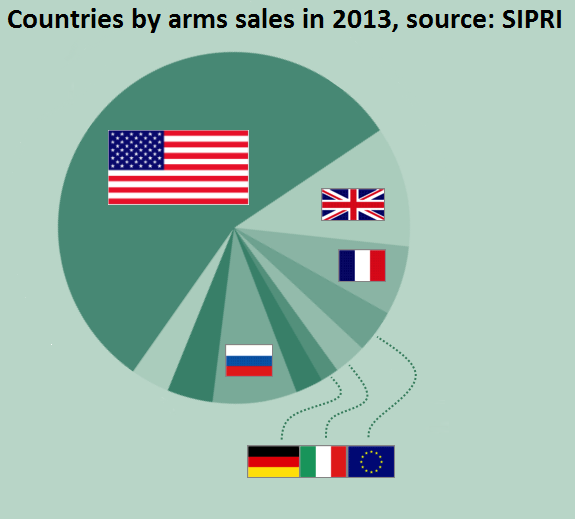
Share of arms sales by country. Source is provided by SIPRI.

Currently, the United States is the world's largest weapons manufacturer and exporter, followed by Russia, France, Germany, China and the United Kingdom consecutively.

=== International arms dealers ===
Basil Zaharoff's Vickers Company sold weapons to all the parties involved in the Chaco War. Companies like Opel and IBM have been labeled war profiteers for their involvement with the Third Reich. In the case of IBM they developed technologies that were used to count, catalog, and select Jewish people whom could then be targeted for efficient asset confiscation, consolidation in ghettos, deportation, enslaved labor, and, ultimately, annihilation.

==== Commodity dealers ====
War usually leads to a shortage in the supply of commodities, which results in higher prices and higher revenues. Regarding supply and demand in terms of economics, profit is the most important end. During war time, "war-stuff" is in high demand, and demands must be met. Before the invasion of Iraq in 2003, oil production was controlled by the Iraqi government and was off limits to Western companies. As of 2014, foreign owned private firms dominate Iraqi oil production.

==== Civilian contractors ====
Private military contractors, including civilian contractors, are businesses that supply weapons and training to the military, and also handle logistics and base management. While private military contractors may seem similar to mercenaries, the difference is that mercenaries operate illegally. More recently, companies involved with supplying the coalition forces in the Iraq War, such as Bechtel, KBR, Academi (formerly known as Blackwater) and Halliburton, have come under fire for allegedly overcharging for their services. The modern private military company is also offered as an example of sanctioned war profiteering. On the opposing side, companies like Huawei Technologies, which upgraded Saddam's air-defense system between the two Gulf Wars, face such accusations.

==== Black marketeers ====
A distinction can be made between war profiteers who gain by sapping military strength and those who gain by contributing to the war. For instance, during and after World War II, enormous profits were available by selling rationed goods like cigarettes, chocolate, coffee and butter on the black market. Dishonest military personnel given oversight over valuable property sometimes diverted rationed goods to the black market. The charge could also be laid against medical and legal professionals who accept money in exchange for helping young men and nascent politicians evade the draft.

== The state ==
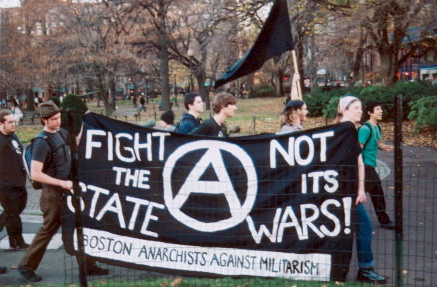
Anarchist protest against militarism with banner reading "fight the state not its wars," Boston

Though war initially had the objective of territorial expansion and resource gathering, the country may also profit politically and strategically, replacing governments that do not fulfill its interests by key allied governments. One example of this is the CIA supporting the Contras with weapons to carry out terror attacks against the Nicaraguan government between the late 1970s and early 1990s.

=== Politicians ===
Political figures taking bribes and favors from corporations involved with war production have been called war profiteers. Abraham Lincoln's first Secretary of War, Simon Cameron, was forced to resign in early 1862 after charges of corruption relating to war contracts. In 1947, Kentucky congressman Andrew J. May, Chairman of the powerful Committee on Military Affairs, was convicted for taking bribes in exchange for war contracts. In 1953, the United States began a covert mission to overthrow the Guatemalan government under Jacobo Arbenez. The process began with the United States labeling the government of Guatemala as a communist government. According to William Blum the reason for the United States’ intervention into Guatemala is that it was pushed by lobbyist from the United Fruit Company. The United Fruit Company had significant holdings within Guatemala and when the government decided to compete with the company this would not be accepted. Numerous officials such as President Eisenhower's Under-Secretary of State (and formerly director of the CIA) Walter Bedell Smith was a candidate for an executive position in the company while at the same time he was helping to plan the intervention. This coup was successful and the United Fruit Company was able to keep its holdings within Guatemala thus ensuring its profits were secure. This is typical of the sort of engagements that the U.S became involved in during the cold war that resulted in war profiteering.

Modern-day war profiteering among politicians has increased with the recent wars in Iraq and Afghanistan. According to an article by USA Today in 2011 the top 100 largest contractors sold 410 billion dollars’ worth of arms and services. Within this massive expense of services has evolved what is called the revolving door. This revolving door has not differentiated between the two political parties. An example of this revolving door is the case of William J. Lynn III. In 2010 he was confirmed to serve as the number two man in the Pentagon after he worked as a lobbyist for Raytheon. This example shows the process of a person joining the government, then being hired as a lobbyist, and back to government. In the UK there are some restrictions on the jobs ex-politicians can take, and similar rules, although less extensive, apply to senior civil servants.

=== Scientific research ===
War provides demand for military technology modernization. Technologies originally designed for the military frequently also have non-military use. Both the state and corporations have gains from scientific research. One famous example is Siri, the artificially intelligent "personal assistant" programmed into Apple devices since October 4, 2011. Siri was a spin-off of CALO, a project funded by the government military development group, DARPA. CALO is an acronym that stands for "Cognitive Assistant that Learns and Organizes".

=== In the United States ===
The War Profiteering Prevention Act of 2007 intended to create criminal penalties for war profiteers and others who exploited taxpayer-funded efforts in Iraq and elsewhere around the world. This act was introduced first on April 25, 2007, but was never enacted into law. War profiteering cases are often brought under the Civil False Claims Act, which was enacted in 1863 to combat war profiteering during the Civil War.

Major General Smedley Butler, United States Marine Corps, criticized war profiteering of US companies during World War I in War Is a Racket. He wrote that some companies and corporations increased their earnings and profits by up to 1,700 percent and how many companies willingly sold equipment and supplies to the US that had no relevant use in the war effort. In the book, Butler stated that "It has been estimated by statisticians and economists and researchers that the war cost your Uncle Sam $52,000,000,000. Of this sum, $39,000,000,000 was expended in the actual war period. This expenditure yielded $16,000,000,000 in profits."

In the American Civil War, concerns about war profiteering were not limited to the activities of a few "shoddy" millionaires in the North. In the Confederacy, where supplies were severely limited, and hardships common, the mere suggestion of profiteering was considered a scurrilous charge. Georgia Quartermaster General Ira Roe Foster attempted to increase the supply of material to the troops by urging the women of his state to knit 50,000 pairs of socks. Foster's sock campaign stimulated the supply of the much needed item, but it also met with a certain amount of suspicion and backlash. Either the result of a Union disinformation campaign, or the work of suspicious minds, rumors, which Foster denied as a "malicious falsehood!", began to spread that Foster and others were profiteering from the socks. It was alleged that the socks contributed were being sold, rather than given to the troops. The charge was not without precedent. The historian Jeanie Attie notes that in 1861, an "especially damaging rumor" (later found to be true) circulated in the North, alleging that the Union Army purchased 5,000 pairs of socks which had been donated, and intended for the troops, from a private relief agency, the United States Sanitary Commission. As the Sanitary Commission had done in the North, Foster undertook a propaganda campaign in Georgia newspapers to combat the damaging rumors and to encourage the continued contribution of socks. He offered $1,000.00 to any "citizen or soldier who will come forward and prove that he ever bought a sock from this Department that was either knit by the ladies or purchased for issue to said troops."

==== Iraq War profiteers ====
Companies such as Halliburton have been criticized in the context of the Iraq War for their perceived war profiteering.

Steven Clemons, a senior fellow at the New America Foundation think tank, has accused former CIA Director James Woolsey of both profiting from and promoting the Iraq War.

The Center for Public Integrity reported US Senator Dianne Feinstein, who voted in favor of the Iraq Resolution, and her husband, Richard Blum, as making millions of dollars from Iraq and Afghanistan contracts through his company, Tutor Perini Corporation. Financial disclosure forms indicate that as of January 2020 51 members of Congress and their partners own between $2.3 and $5.8 million of stock in the top 30 corporations that sell goods and services to the US military.

Indicted defense contractor Brent R. Wilkes was reported to be ecstatic when hearing that the United States was going to go to war with Iraq. "He and some of his top executives were really gung-ho about the war," said a former employee. "Brent said this would create new opportunities for the company. He was really excited about doing business in the Middle East." One of the top profiteers from the Iraq War was oil field services corporation, Halliburton. Halliburton gained $39.5 billion in "federal contracts related to the Iraq war". Many individuals have asserted that there were profit motives for the Bush-Cheney administration to invade Iraq in 2003. Dick Cheney served as Halliburton's CEO from 1995 until 2000. Cheney claimed he had cut ties with the corporation although, according to a CNN report, "Cheney was still receiving about $150,000 a year in deferred payments." Cheney vowed to not engage in a conflict of interest. However, the Congressional Research Office discovered Cheney held 433,000 Halliburton stock options while serving as Vice President of the United States. 2016 Presidential Candidate, Rand Paul referenced Cheney's interview with the American Enterprise Institute in which Cheney said invading Iraq "would be a disaster, it would be vastly expensive, it would be civil war, we'd have no exit strategy...it would be a bad idea". Rand continues by concluding "that's why the first Bush didn't go into Baghdad. Dick Cheney then goes to work for Halliburton. Makes hundreds of millions of dollars- their CEO. Next thing you know, he's back in government, it's a good idea to go into Iraq." Another prominent critic is Huffington Post co-founder, Arianna Huffington. Huffington has said, "We have the poster child of Bush-Cheney crony capitalism, Halliburton, involved in this. They, after all, were responsible for cementing the well."

==== Afghanistan War ====
During the Afghanistan War, defense sector stocks outperformed the average of the stock market by 58%. Commentators put into question whether the 2021 Taliban takeover of Afghanistan could be considered a failure for the United States. Jon Schwarz of The Intercept wrote that "These numbers suggest that it is incorrect to conclude [that the] Afghanistan War was a failure. On the contrary, from the perspective of some of the most powerful people in the U.S., it may have been an extraordinary success. Notably, the boards of directors of all [top] five defense contractors include retired top-level military officers."

From 2007, there were regularly more contractors than U.S. forces in Afghanistan. By 2016, private contractors outnumbered US state personnel three to one. In 2016, the Harris Corporation was awarded a $1.7 billion contract to supply communications equipment to Afghan security forces.

=== Russian invasion of Ukraine ===
The major oil and gas companies, including Shell, ExxonMobil, Chevron, Phillips 66, BP and Sinopec, and the major weapon manufacturers, such as Raytheon, Lockheed Martin and BAE Systems, reported sharp rises in interim revenues and profits. BP however also lost over $20 billion by abandoning its investments in Russia.

The term "ABCD" refers to the four companies – ADM, Bunge, Cargill and Louis Dreyfus – that dominate world agricultural commodity trading. The ABCD commodity-trading companies have seen large profits as a result of the Russian invasion of Ukraine and rising food prices.

In March 2022, Bloomberg reported that China was reselling its US LNG shipments to a desperate Europe at a "hefty profit". India was buying discounted oil from Russia. Saudi Arabia also increased imports of discounted Russian oil. In September 2022, German Economy Minister Robert Habeck accused the United States and other "friendly" gas supplier nations that they were profiting from the Ukraine war with "astronomical prices". He called for more solidarity by the US to assist energy-pressed allies in Europe.

In April 2022, Russia supplied 45% of EU's gas imports, earning $900 million a day. In the first two months after Russia invaded Ukraine, Russia earned $66.5 billion from fossil fuel exports, and the EU accounted for 71% of that trade.

=== 2026 Iran war ===
With the outbreak of the 2026 Iran war, multiple industries have benefited, from energy (with oil suppliers said to be engaging in "unfair" practices, such as price gouging), defense and financial markets all have begun to redistribute wealth toward countries and companies positioned to supply what the crisis has made scarce.

== See also ==
- Arms industry
- Companies by arms sales
- List of defense contractors
- Mercenary
- Military–industrial complex
- War hawk
- War Is a Racket
