= Ira Roe Foster =

American general, politician and businessman

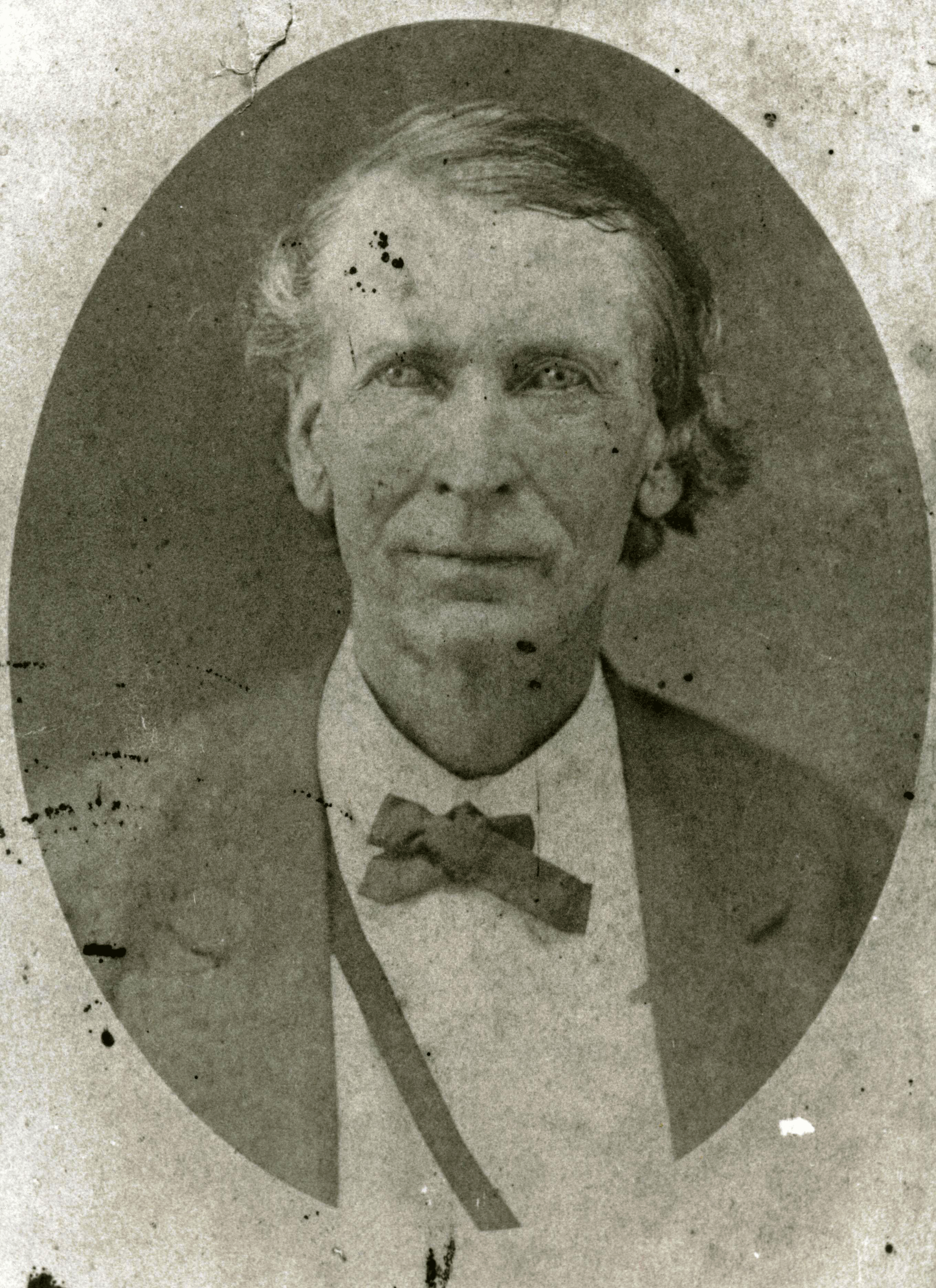

Quartermaster General of Georgia
- In office May 18, 1861 – June 24, 1865

Personal details
- Born: January 19, 1811 Spartanburg County, South Carolina, US
- Died: November 24, 1885 (aged 74) Etowah County, Alabama, US
- Party: Democratic
- Spouse: Mildred Creighton Crook
- Children: Amantha Camilla, Erycenia Penthecelia, Nancy Lucinda Creighton, and Marcus Lucuius
- Occupation: Teacher, medical doctor, attorney, soldier, businessman, politician

Military service
- Allegiance: United States of America; Confederate States of America
- Branch/service: United States Army; 7th Georgia Infantry
- Years of service: 1835–1842 (USA); 1842–1851 (Georgia Militia)
- Rank: Colonel U.S. Army; Brigadier General (Georgia Militia)
- Commands: 2nd Brigade 7th Georgia Militia
- Battles/wars: Seminole Wars

Ira Roe Foster (January 9, 1811 – November 19, 1885) was a teacher, medical doctor, attorney, soldier, businessman, and politician from South Carolina. During the 1840s, Foster served as brigadier general in the Georgia Militia.

In 1861, the American Civil War began when the state of Georgia and six other slave states declared their intent to secede and form the Confederate States of America. Foster was appointed Quartermaster General of the Confederate state of Georgia. He continued to hold the position of Quartermaster General after the collapse of the Confederacy and the end of the war. He remained active in Georgia state politics into the Reconstruction period. Foster was also elected as the first mayor of Eastman, Georgia. He served in the Georgia House of Representatives and was elected to the state senates of both Georgia and Alabama.

== Early political life and careers ==
Ira Roe Foster was born on January 9, 1811, on the Tyger River, Spartanburg County, South Carolina, to Ransom and Nancy Foster. He became a school teacher at an early age, then studied medicine and practiced in South Carolina.

Foster moved to Georgia, likely in the later 1830s after Indian Removal, settling in Forsyth County. He was elected as a Democrat to the state senate, representing Forsyth County for one term, from 1838 to 1839. In 1841, Foster became a licensed lawyer in Cherokee County, Georgia. He was elected as that county's State Representative to the legislature. On September 2, 1845, U.S. Representative John H. Lumpkin wrote to President James K. Polk, urging President Polk to appoint Foster to a consular position in the West Indies. Lumpkin reminded the President that the whole of the Georgia delegation supported Foster's application. Foster did not receive the appointment.

In addition to being a merchant and attorney, Foster maintained extensive business interests in land and flour and saw mills in north-central Georgia and Alabama. In early 1850, he also invested in the Dahlonega and Marietta Turnpike and Plank Road Company.

== Military service ==
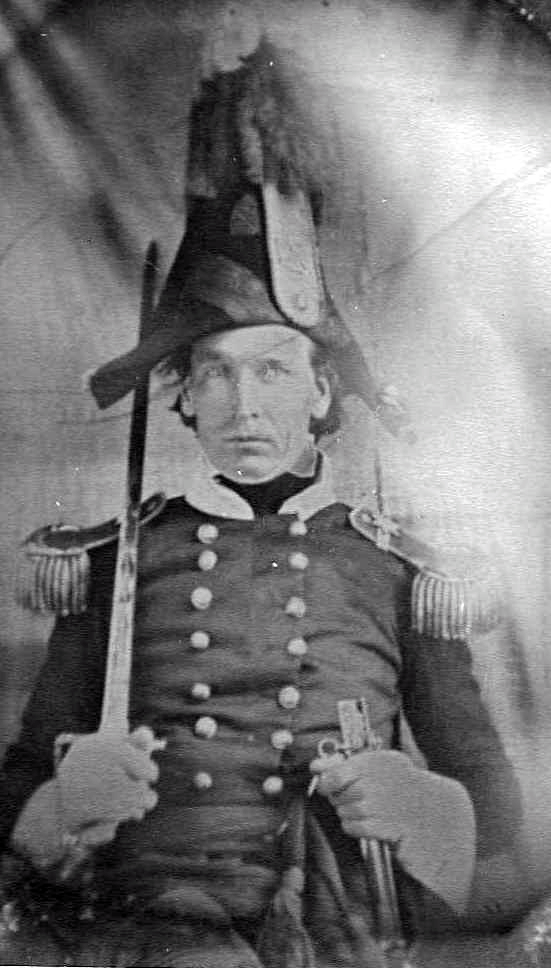
Ira Roe Foster - Brigadier General

During the Seminole Indian War in 1836 in Florida, Foster served as a colonel of a mounted infantry. He was seriously wounded and carried on a litter for 50 miles. He recovered and joined the Georgia Militia in 1842, becoming aide-de-camp for the Commander-in-Chief. Foster was subsequently commissioned brigadier general of the 2nd Brigade of the 7th Division in 1845.

== Quartermaster General of Georgia ==
The Confederate-aligned governor of Georgia, Joseph E. Brown (to whom Foster had been both a friend and a political confidant) appointed Foster as Georgia's Quartermaster General on May 18, 1861, during the early months of the American Civil War. His assistant was Edward M.B. Galt, whose title was Chief of Ordnance, charged with supervising the forging and turning of gun barrels. On May 21, 1861, within days of his appointment, Foster appealed to the women of Atlanta to meet at City Hall and "prepare one hundred uniforms for soldiers preparing to leave for Virginia." In the fall of 1861, the need to obtain clothing for the Confederate Army was (temporarily) satisfied by the establishment of Quartermaster's depots. Garment shops were set up and shoe shops built to manufacture needed military supplies. Georgia companies fighting in Virginia sent men back to their state to collect clothing and blankets for the troops. Adjutant-General Henry C. Wayne instructed Foster to "proceed personally, or by duly accredited agents, into all parts of the state, and buy 25,000 suits of clothes and 25,000 pairs of shoes for the destitute Ga. troops in the Confederate service."

Apart from that brief period in 1861 when supplies were adequate, Georgia soldiers were chronically in need of basic essentials. In December 1862, the Georgia Legislature appropriated $1,500,000 for the purchase of military clothing and blankets. Anticipating the inadequacy of that measure, it also authorized Governor Brown to seize factories and supplies, as needed. The Governor executed the order, but authorized Foster to pay sellers 10% and manufacturers 25% of the value of their seized goods. Foster, in the course of his duty, appealed to the people's "love of liberty" in meeting the demands placed upon them. While Foster's actions benefited the troops, the effect on civilians was harsh. According to the New Georgia Encyclopedia, "The Quartermaster Department's persistent purchases (or impressments) of the bulk of the state's textile and shoe manufactures left civilians facing intense scarcity and exorbitant prices. These conditions often led to accusations of profiteering." While civilians may have faced scarcities and high prices, conditions for many Georgia soldiers were far worse. In late August 1863, following the Battle of Gettysburg, one Georgia colonel forwarded a requisition to Foster "in which he reported his command as destitute of everything". Men in his unit had worn out two pairs of shoes on the Northern march, and "all faced the prospect of frostbite, pleurisy, or pneumonia in the coming winter." By this period of the war, Gettysburg historian John Heiser observes:

Georgia... had clothing depots in Atlanta, Columbus and Athens where uniforms based on a state-adopted pattern were manufactured, gathered for inspection and shipment to Richmond where these items were then distributed to Georgia units serving in Lee’s army.

Foster's level of organization in Georgia did not, however, result in the smooth flow of supplies, once they left the state. Heiser notes that

the logistical nightmare of getting clothing to Richmond warehouses followed by transport to the army caused countless shortages and more often than not, soldiers were forced to improvise by acquiring clothing through other means.

By 1864, the situation had become even more desperate. Writing to Foster on January 24, 1864, General James Longstreet noted:

There are five Georgia Brigades in this Army – Wofford's, G.T. Anderson's, Bryan's, Benning's, and Crews' cavalry brigade. They are all alike in excessive need of shoes, clothing of all kinds, and blankets. All that you can send will be thankfully received.

The duties of the Quartermaster General required, on occasion, a degree of clandestine activity, both to ensure the security of textile mills, and to prevent mill owners from shipping their goods to out-of-state buyers. According to Dr. Harold S. Wilson:

The sources of dangers to the mills was not always clear. In June 1864, Enoch Steadman's Lawrenceville factory in Georgia inexplicably burned. This company worked exclusively [supplying finished goods for Georgia soldiers] for Governor Joseph E. Brown, but Georgia quartermaster Ira Foster was forced to keep it under surveillance to ensure that the state received its goods. One of Steadman's employees [warned him] that Quartermaster Foster had 'parties watching your concern and he has expressed the belief that you are sneaking and that he says he will have goods or blood.'

The Quartermaster General did not limit his efforts to supplying material to Georgia troops. On July 31, 1863, in an effort to thwart Union recruitment of foreigners, Foster wrote to President Jefferson Davis, proposing that the Confederacy send foreign-born "men of talent" to their native lands, especially to Ireland "to write, speak, and in every way labor to disabuse the minds of these deluded Europeans" about inducements made by Union recruiting agents.

Foster worked to maintain supplies and clothes for Georgia soldiers throughout the war, and continuing in his office even after the collapse of the Confederacy.

=== Appealing for socks ===
As Quartermaster, Foster attempted to secure supplies from every source. In December 1862, according to University of Georgia professor and historian Kenneth Coleman, Foster "appealed to every woman in the state of Georgia to send him a pair of socks for the army." Another notable effort was the campaign to secure 50,000 socks from organizations such as the "Young Ladies' Patriotic Society" (pledging one garment a week from each member) as well as from individual girls and women of Georgia. In October 1863, Foster placed announcements in newspapers throughout the state, asking for contributions. He pledged to make available an ample supply of yarn for those knitters willing to undertake the task, but lacking in material. Foster also asked them to attach their names to their work, so that a complete and detailed record could be maintained of each contribution and contributor. In his request, he expressed hope that the socks would:

Cheer our soldiers, discourage desertions, hurry off able bodied furloughed men to the front and stimulate them to prefer honorable deaths in the face of the enemy, to dishonest lives prolonged by shrinking from duty.

On December 24, 1863, a notice was placed in the Savannah Republican by one Carrie Bell Sinclair, poet and president of the local Ladies' Knitting Society, stating:

Having received from the Quartermaster General a large supply of knitting thread, members of the Society, or any one interested in the soldiers, can be supplied by calling on me any time during the week. We have been unable to supply all who have come forward and entered their names as members of the Society, having been entirely out of thread for the last two or three weeks. But we have now on hand enough for eighty or ninety pair of socks, and we hope those interested in the matter will come forward now and assist us in getting them done as early as possible. With the beginning of the New Year, let us renew our efforts in behalf of the suffering soldiers, and do all that we can for their comfort.

Foster's sock campaign stimulated the supply of the much needed item, but may have also met with a certain amount of suspicion and backlash. Rumors of profiteering by the Quartermaster's office had circulated earlier, when Foster's purchases and impressments of textiles and shoes had driven up the price of goods. Foster claimed that new rumors, which he denied as a "malicious falsehood!", had spread that he and his department were profiteering from the socks. It was alleged that contributed socks were being sold, rather than given freely to the troops. The charge would not have been without precedent. The historian Jeanie Attie notes that in 1861, an "especially damaging rumor" (later found to be true) had circulated in the North, alleging that the Union Army had purchased 5000 pairs of socks which had been donated, and intended for the troops, from a private relief agency, the United States Sanitary Commission. As the Sanitary Commission had done in the North, Foster undertook a propaganda campaign in Georgia newspapers to combat the alleged rumors and to encourage the continued contribution of socks. He offered $1,000.00 to any "citizen or soldier who will come forward and prove that he ever bought a sock from this Department that was either knit by the ladies or purchased for issue to said troops."

=== The Battle of Atlanta ===
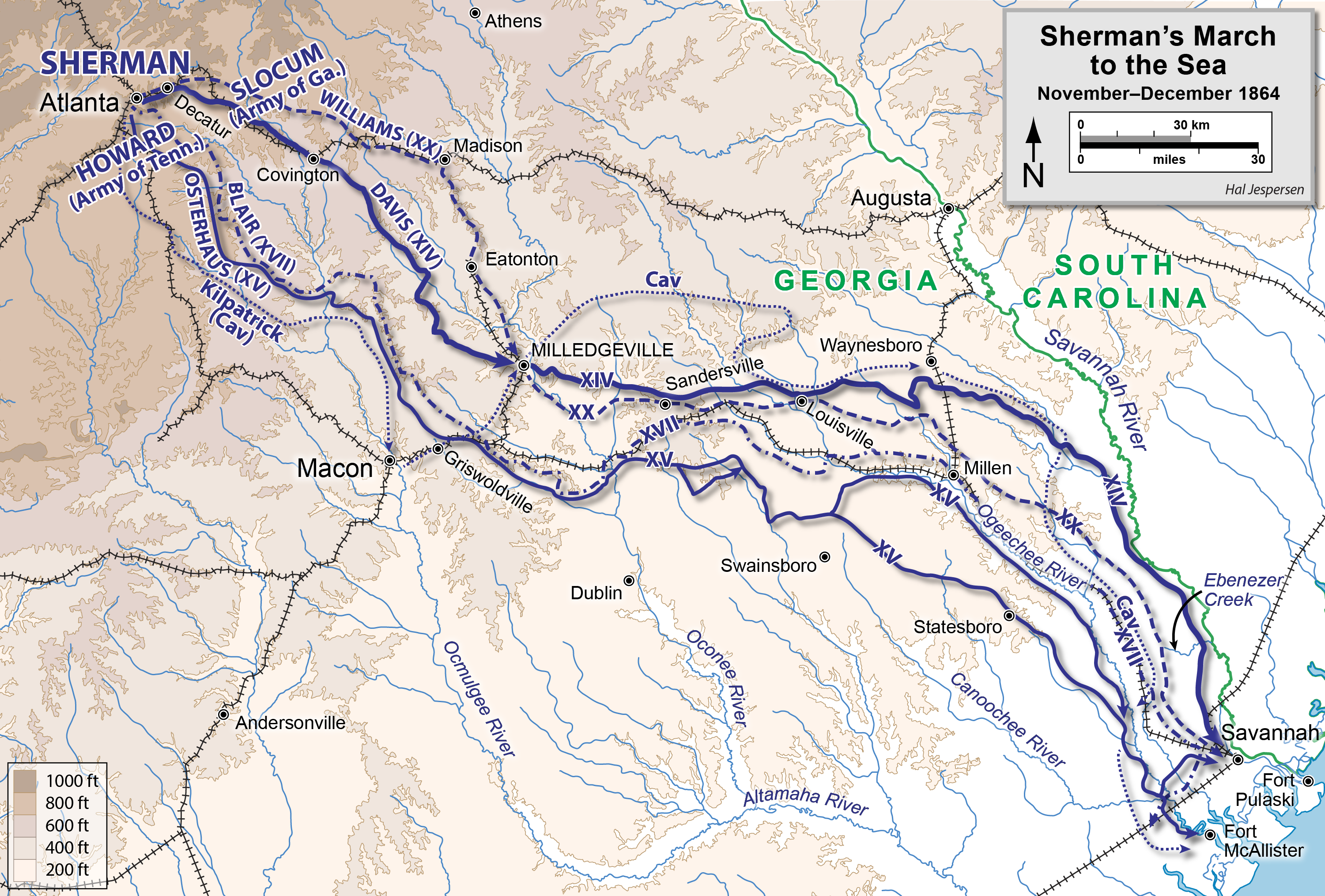
Sherman's March to the Sea.

Leading up to the Battle of Peachtree Creek during the Atlanta campaign, Foster's home was occupied by General A.P. Stewart (CSA), who made it his headquarters. Georgia Historical Commission marker 060-90, erected at that location, states:

Site of the Ira R. Foster house which was occupied as headquarters by Gen. A. P. Stewart, [CSA] during military operations N. of Atlanta, July 16–21, 1864. From here were issued the orders directing his troops in the Battle of Peachtree Creek, July 20.

After Atlanta's capture by Union forces, a refugee settlement was established in Terrell County for civilians forced to flee the city. The Fosterville settlement, named after the Quartermaster General, was according to author Mary Elizabeth Massey, the "most ambitious refugee project approved by the Georgia General Assembly" [during that period]. On March 11, 1865, the Georgia General Assembly authorized General Foster to "continue to provide for maintenance of said exiles, or such of them as are unable by their labor to support themselves, or their families for the balance of the present year."

=== The capture of Milledgeville ===
After the fall of Atlanta, General William Tecumseh Sherman began his March to the Sea. The route, from Atlanta to Savannah took the left wing of Sherman's army to the city of Milledgeville, Georgia's state capital. With the fall of Milledgeville imminent, Governor Brown ordered Foster to remove state records from the city. The task proved to be difficult, undertaken in the midst of chaos as Federal troops closed in on the city. The records were stored at a "lunatic asylum" three miles outside of town. A train was held at the depot to facilitate their removal. But in the bedlam of panicked citizens fleeing the city, labor was difficult to find.

When the Governor saw the condition of affairs, he went to the penitentiary, had the convicts drawn up in a line, and made them a short speech; he appealed to their patriotic pride and offered pardon to each one who would help remove the State property and then enlist for the defense of Georgia. They responded promptly, were put under the command of Gen. Foster, and did valuable service in loading the train. When that was done each one was given a suit of gray, and a gun, and they were formed into a military company of which one of their number was captain. They were ordered to report for duty to Gen. Wayne, who was commanding a small battalion of militia at Milledgeville and also the Georgia cadets from the Military Institute at Marietta.

— FRANCES LETCHER MITCHELL

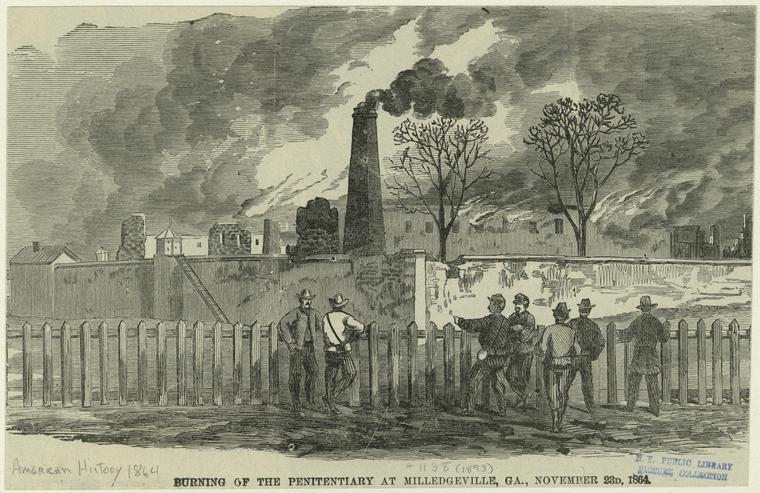
Burning of the penitentiary at Milledgeville, GA by the Union Army (November 23, 1864)

=== Arrest and Union commission ===
In 1865, Foster traveled to Virginia, where he was imprisoned by the Union Army for his service to the Confederacy. However, in recognition of his abilities, he was subsequently released and commissioned by the Union army to distribute livestock and supplies throughout Georgia. In his History of the State of Georgia from 1850 to 1881, the historian I.W. Avery remarks:

In many particulars the Federal soldiers acted very cleverly. Gen. [James H.] Wilson turned over to Gen. Ira Foster the Confederate mules, horses, wagons, and harness, for distribution to the poor, and Col. J.H.R. Washington of Macon, was associated with Gen. Foster to aid in the distribution.

On June 24, 1865, in General Order #31, General Wilson expressed appreciation to Foster and Washington, and relieved them of their authority, placing the task with Capt. R. Carter, A.Q.M., Cavalry Corps Military Division of the Mississippi.

== Personal life and later years ==
Foster married Mildred Arthur Creighton Crooks in 1842. They had four children: Amalthea Camilla, Erycenia Penthecelia, Nancy Lucinda Creighton, and Marcus Lucuius. In 1867, Foster moved his family to Georgia Mountain, Alabama, where he owned six miles of Tennessee River front farming land, a large portion of the mountain and a saw mill, purchased before the war. Simultaneously, Foster operated a saw mill in Dodge County, Georgia, building a residence there in 1869. Foster participated in the area's saw mill boom, which was said to average one mill every two miles, along the industrial corridor created by the Macon and Brunswick Railroad. In his book The New South Comes to Wiregrass Georgia 1860–1910 author Mark V. Wetherington states: "Ira R. Foster shipped lumber to Brunswick, where it was loaded onto timber schooners and transported to international markets like Liverpool, Rio de Janeiro, and Havana." When the city of Eastman was incorporated in 1872, Foster served as its first mayor. Foster was also elected to the position of state senator in Alabama. He moved to Gadsden in 1883 when his wife died. There he built a two-story colonial home on the stage coach route, in an area which became known as Foster's Cross Roads. In the Alabama Senate, Foster was regarded as a reformer, supporting efficiency in state operations such as the consolidation of county poor farms into regional centers. His efforts, however, were largely thwarted by "localist sentiment" and the indifference of his fellow legislators. Foster continued to serve in the Alabama Senate until his death on November 19, 1885.

== See also ==
- Atlanta in the American Civil War
- Blockade runners of the Civil War - Supplying the Confederacy
- Confederate States Army - Supply and Logistics
- General James H. Wilson
- Georgia during Reconstruction
- Georgia in the American Civil War
- Irish Americans in the American Civil War
- Uniforms of the Confederate States military forces

== Correspondence collections ==
- Ira Roe Foster Papers, 1862–1865, finding aid created by Rob S. Cox, May 1996, and Philip Heslip, October 2009 (Manuscripts Division, William L. Clements Library: The University of Michigan - James S. Schoff Civil War Collection) – a collection of 105 war-time letters (1862 to 1865).
- Ira R. Foster papers 1844-1873 (Hargrett Rare Book & Manuscript Library: The University of Georgia) – the collection consists of correspondence of Ira R. Foster from 1844-1873. Correspondence deals with his duties as Quartermaster-General of Georgia during the Civil War, The Georgia lumber industry (Terrell County, Georgia) and personal and family matters. Correspondents include C.R. Armstrong, Joseph E. Brown, Howell Cobb, D.H. Mason, William H. Stiles, and The Southerner and Commercial Advertisers.
- Joseph Emmerson Brown Letters (AlabamaMosaic: The University of Alabama) - the collection contains twenty-three letters from Georgia Governor Joseph E. Brown to Ira R. Foster,
