= Charles Rinaldo Floyd =

American politician (1797–1845)

Member of the Georgia House of Representatives from Camden County
- In office 1829–1829

Personal details
- Born: October 14, 1797 Darien, McIntosh County, Georgia
- Died: March 22, 1845 (aged 47) Fairfield Plantation, Camden County, Georgia
- Spouse(s): Catherine Sophia Powell; Julia Ross Boog
- Education: Sunbury Academy

Military service
- Branch/service: Georgia Militia
- Rank: Brigadier General
- Battles/wars: Trail of Tears; Second Seminole War

Charles Rinaldo Floyd (October 14, 1797 – March 22, 1845) was an American planter, politician and military leader most famous for his leading the Trail of Tears out of Georgia and for his Okefenokee Campaign during the Second Seminole War. He wrote one of the first published accounts of the Okefenokee Swamp. His diary portrays elite planter life on the Georgia frontier.

== Early and family life ==
Charles Rinaldo Floyd was born October 14, 1797, at "The Thickets" near Darien in McIntosh County, Georgia, to General John Floyd and Isabella Maria Hazzard. His grandfather, Captain Charles Floyd, served in the American Revolutionary War. His father, General John Floyd, served during the War of 1812 and the Creek Indian War.

When he was three years old the family moved to Camden County where they purchased large tracts of land located south of the Satilla River, north of the Crooked River and west of the marshes and the Cumberland River to what is now I-95. This area, farmed using enslaved labor, became known as "Floyd's Neck." General John Floyd built Bellevue Plantation within view of the marshes leading to Todd's Creek for his father, Charles. That manor house has an anchor-shaped footprint, to symbolize their fortunes provided by the sea. One mile distant, he built Fairfield Plantation overlooking Floyd's Basin and Floyd's Creek for himself. Charles Rinaldo Floyd spent his early childhood years in Camden County. He was educated at home by tutors and later went to boarding school in Beaufort, South Carolina. He attended Sunbury Academy in Sunbury, Georgia.

As discussed below, at age sixteen, Charles Rinaldo Floyd left Sunbury Academy to serve as a military aide to his father, General John Floyd, whose army at that time was entrenched at Fort Mitchell. Afterward, Floyd attended the U.S. Military Academy at West Point, New York, but was dismissed in 1817 for insubordination over what he considered "a point of honor." He received a marine lieutenant's commission nonetheless, as discussed below, but was court martialed and suspended with pay in 1820 for caning a storekeeper who had insulted a sentinel. Charles used the time to travel to Europe and tour Napoleonic battlefields.

On May 22, 1823, Charles Rinaldo Floyd married Catharine Sophia Powell in Boston. They had two daughters, both born in Camden County, after Mrs. Floyd moved to Camden County to live with her in-laws. However, she missed her friends and relatives in Boston, so in 1828, she sailed for Boston with a servant and her fourteen-month-old baby. On disembarking in Boston Harbor, the servant slid off of the dock and fell into the water with the baby. A gentleman passenger jumped into the cold water and rescued both, but the child died. Charles was initially not told of his little daughter's demise. However, his wife went into a severe mental decline and lost her desire to live. Her sister and grandmother both urged Charles to travel to Boston and see about her. He reluctantly agreed and sailed to Boston, only to discover that both his wife and daughter had died.

Charles Rinaldo Floyd met Julia Ross Boog, who became his second wife, at a friend's wedding. He was immediately smitten, describing her as tall, lithe, with dark brown eyes and with thick dark, cascading hair. They were married on September 9, 1831, at Bellevue Plantation. They had seven children. Julia Ross Boog was born April 16, 1815, at King's Bay Plantation near St. Marys, Georgia, the daughter of John Boog and Isabella Kelly~King Turner. Charles and Julia and their children lived at Fairfield, a traditional two-story Southern style home, which his father gave them. An armory was added to house the array of weapons collected by Charles: swords, lances, daggers, knives, double barrel guns, dueling and long-shot rifles, carbines, pistols, dueling pistols, bows and arrows. The stately home also had a library and a sketching room where Charles painted miniatures of family members as well as his now famous horse sketches.

== Early military, plantation and political careers ==
At age sixteen, Charles Rinaldo Floyd left Sunbury Academy to serve as a military aide to his father, General John Floyd, whose army at that time was entrenched at Fort Mitchell. During the Creek Indian War, he saw combat in the Battles of Tallassee, Chalibee and Autossee. Autossee was an Indian town of the Creek Nation on the Tallapoosa River. The Georgia militia cut off escape routes, then completely destroyed and burned the town and slaughtered more than 200 Indians, including women and children. According to his Journal, in the frenzy of his first battle, a rifle ball grazed Charles' forehead and another passed through his coat sleeve.

Floyd then attended the U.S. Military Academy at West Point, New York. He was dismissed in 1817 for insubordination over what he considered "a point of honor." Floyd's family background and early training as a soldier resulted in a penchant for dueling, a practice he engaged in throughout his lifetime. After his dismissal from West Point, Floyd received a commission as lieutenant in the marines. In 1820, Lieutenant Floyd was arrested for caning a naval store keeper who had insulted a sentinel. He was tried before a Marine Military Court and suspended from duty for twelve months with full pay and emoluments. In his Journal he wrote, "I wish to see the Old World in my youth, the best time for observation and improvement". He decided to travel to England and the Napoleonic battlefields of Europe, and returned to marine duty in 1821.

In 1824, Floyd served as Commander of the Marine Honor Guard whose primary goal was to protect the Marquis de Lafayette when he arrived in New York City to tour the United States. In 1825, Floyd resigned his commission in the Marine Corps and returned to Camden County to take up life as a gentleman planter.

In 1829, he served as a Georgia Legislator in the House of Representatives at Milledgeville in Baldwin County, Georgia. He was elected brigadier general for the Georgia Militia's 1st Brigade of the 1st Division.

In 1837, an altercation arose over cattle. A neighbor, Edward Stevens Hopkins, allowed his slaves to capture and kill Floyd's cows that had roamed onto his property and trampled his patches of peas. In his Journal, Charles Rinaldo Floyd labeled Hopkins as "the cow-thief" and "the enemy". The true reason for the confrontation was that Edward S. Hopkins announced his name for election as Major of the 8th Battalion, First Regiment, Georgia Militia. Floyd felt, that as Brigadier-General, he alone had the right to order such an election and he challenged Hopkins to a duel. Hopkins accepted under the Code Duello. In October 1837 a "battle" was fought on Amelia Island Beach. Hopkins fell at the first fire, shot in the upper leg near the hip. He survived but thereafter walked with a severe limp. Long after the duel, Floyd continued to refer to Hopkins in derogatory terms.

In May 1838, under orders from Governor Gilmer, Charles Rinaldo Floyd commanded troops effecting removal of Cherokee Indians from northern Georgia. Indian families were rounded up and placed in internment camps before their forced march out West – clearly written about in textbooks today and well-documented as The Trail of Tears. At his headquarters at New Echota he wrote to troops under his command, "A truly good soldier is known chiefly by his ready compliance with the orders of his superior – his valor in battle, and his humanity to the vanquished".

== Second Seminole War and Okefenokee Campaign ==
Floyd was appointed brigadier general of the Georgia militia in October 1838 and ordered to meet five companies and chase a party of Seminoles out of the Okefenokee Swamp. The Indian refugees had been forced north during the Second Seminole Wars, and their presence caused anxiety and conflict in the south Georgia.

He wrote letters detailing his Okefenokee campaign to regional newspapers. The Savannah Georgian printed his first letter, and multiple newspapers reprinted it. He wrote that it was “a satisfaction to me to have performed what all other men have deemed impossible; to cross the Okefenokee with an army.”

However, Floyd was deeply disappointed the following year when the Georgia legislature appointed Peter Cone rather than himself as Major General of the state militia.

== Retirement ==
In April 1843 he sold 2,000 acres of land to fund his hobbies. He founded of the Camden County Hunting Club, and his racing boats were famous in the area. Canoes especially were a travel and sporting boat of choice in the area and they were manned by crews of strong slaves in races. He was a secretary of the Aquatic Club of Georgia, and in 1837 challenged New York boating clubs to a race. Floyd was also an avid collector of rare and antique weapons, and sometimes hunted with a medieval-style lance.

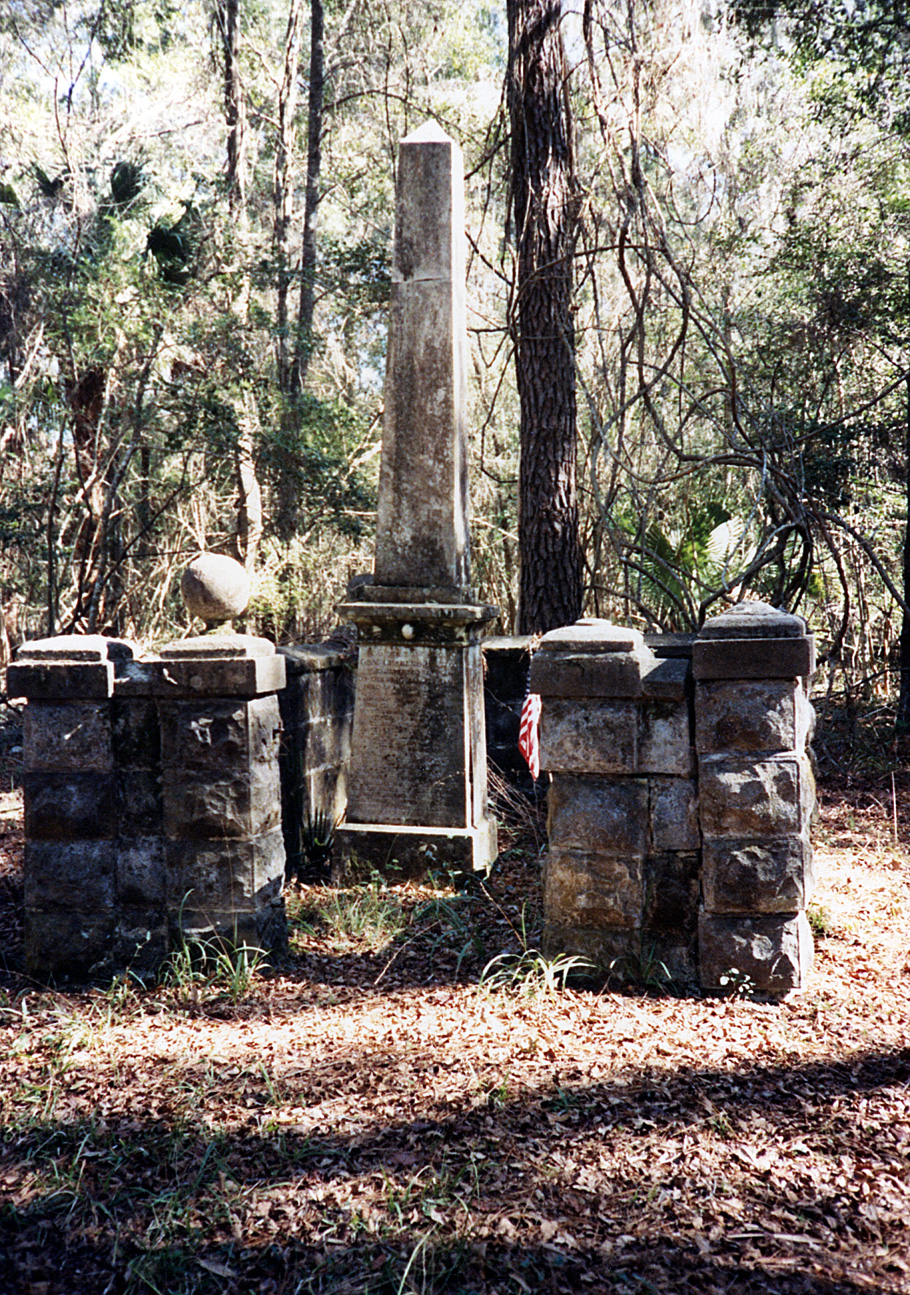
The Charles Rinaldo Floyd Monument is located at the site of the former Fairfield Plantation on Floyd's Neck in Camden County, Georgia

== Death and legacy ==
Charles Rinaldo Floyd died on March 22, 1845, at his beloved Fairfield Plantation. After hours of excruciating pain in his right side, he died at 2 a.m. in the morning with his wife sitting beside him. At his request, his body was wrapped in an American Flag and buried under a pine tree at Fairfield Plantation. Soldiers who had served under him erected a marble monument in his honor. It is now the only structure on Fairfield plantation.

During the American Civil War and First World War, the Macon Volunteers renamed themselves the "Floyd rifles" to honor this Floyd.

His daughter Mary Faith Floyd was the mother of Secretary of the Treasury William Gibbs McAdoo.
