= Griswoldville, Georgia =

Unincorporated community in Georgia, U.S.

Coordinates: 32°52′14″N 83°29′20″W

Griswoldville is an unincorporated community in Jones County, in the U.S. state of Georgia. Griswoldville is located about ten miles east of Macon.

== History ==
A post office called Griswoldville was established in 1849, and remained in operation until 1928. Variant names are "Griswold" and "Griswoldsville".

The community was founded as an industrial site/company town by, and named for, Samuel Griswold, proprietor of a local cotton mill. In addition to his three-story, 24-room mansion, Griswold built a church, slave and workers quarters, expanded his cotton gin factory (which later produced firearms), a saw mill, a grist mill, brickworks, and factories that made furniture, candles, soap, and other products.

The town was largely destroyed at the Battle of Griswoldville in 1864 during the American Civil War.
