= Richard Ferdinand Floyd =

Richard Ferdinand Floyd (1810-1870) was an American soldier from the U.S. state of Georgia.

He was born in Camden County, Georgia, on July 7, 1810, to John and Isabella Floyd. His father, John Floyd, served in the American army in the War of 1812 as a major general and was later elected to the United States House of Representatives.

Floyd's childhood was spent on the family plantation, Fairfield, in Camden County. As he matured, he followed in his father's footsteps, serving as a captain of Georgia troops in the Second Seminole War and entering public service as sheriff of the county. After the Second Seminole War, Floyd moved to St. Augustine, Florida and was employed as a draftsman before moving on to manage a plantation in St. John's County, Florida.

When the Civil War erupted, Florida Governor John Milton appointed Floyd as a colonel in the Florida state troops and employed his as an aide-de-camp. Floyd was characterized as "a skillful officer, and a brave and honorable man, with a reputation as a gentleman and an officer above reproach." Floyd was dispatched to Apalachicola, Florida in the fall of 1861 to command the garrison.

Floyd was promoted to brigadier general and commander-in-chief of Florida's state troops on November 29, 1861, by Governor Milton. He remained in Apalachicola, preparing the defenses of the city and making it the crux of western Florida's defenses. His troops policed illegal trade between locals and the Union blockade fleet, eventually finding it necessary to stop all outbound traffic on the Apalachicola River. In March 1862, his brigade disbanded and Floyd went to eastern Florida to raise guerrillas. Governor Milton lobbied Confederate President Jefferson Davis to appoint Floyd as a Confederate general, but failed to persuade Davis. Instead, Floyd was made colonel of the volunteers of the 8th Florida Infantry regiment on July 15, 1862. Poor health forced Floyd to resign his commission less than three months later on October 2, 1862, ending his military career.

His estate and fortune devastated by the war, Floyd became an insurance agent in Clay County, Florida where he resided until his death on June 27, 1870. He is interred in Hickory Grove Cemetery in Green Cove Springs, Florida.
