= James John Thomas =

Former mayor of Columbus, Ohio

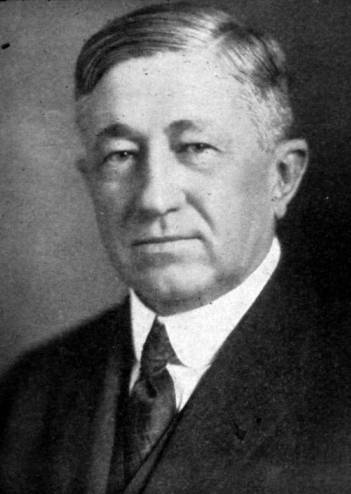

40th Mayor of Columbus
- In office January 1, 1920 – 1931
- Preceded by: George J. Karb
- Succeeded by: Henry W. Worley

Personal details
- Born: 1868 Wrexham, North Wales
- Died: August 6, 1947 (aged 78–79)
- Party: Republican
- Profession: City Council member Mayor

James John Thomas (1868 – August 6, 1947) was a Republican politician from the U.S. state of Ohio. He was the 40th mayor of Columbus, Ohio and the 36th person to serve in that office. He was elected on Tuesday, November 4, 1919 and defeated incumbent Democratic mayor George J. Karb. He served Columbus immediately after World War I and throughout the 1920s.

After three consecutive terms in office he was defeated in the 1931 mayoral election by Henry W. Worley.

== Bibliography ==
- Egger, Charles, ed. (1975). Columbus Mayors (PDF). Columbus, Ohio: Columbus Citizen-Journal.
- "Thomas, James John (1868-8/6/1947)". Columbus in Historic Photographs. Columbus. Ohio: Columbus Metropolitan Library.

Political offices
Preceded by George J. Karb	Mayor of Columbus, Ohio; 1920-1931	Succeeded by Henry W. Worley
