= Georgia Mountain =

Coordinates: 34°22′47″N 86°22′55″W

- Community and Plateau
- Location within Alabama
- Country: United States
- State: Alabama
- County: Marshall
- Time zone: UTC-6 (CST)

Georgia Mountain is a community and small plateau in Marshall County, Alabama, east of Brindlee Mountain.

Located some 6–7 miles northwest of Guntersville with scenic bluffs overlooking much of Guntersville Lake and the dam, wooded areas and open fields. The community contains 3 churches, 3 cemeteries, fire house, community center, horse farm, boarding stables, farmers, chicken houses, and more. Up into the 1980s, the area was mainly farmland, but this changed as the agricultural lifestyle was largely abandoned. Today, the area is made up of mainly subdivisions and small plots of land, with very few traces of old home places for which it was once known. Many of the first families still have descendants living on Georgia Mountain and most of the surviving founding members are buried in one of the cemeteries. Residents come from all walks of life, and homes range from the very basic to the most elegant.

Prior to the American Civil War Ira Roe Foster had purchased about 6 miles of river frontage (including the present Guntersville Dam site) and a large portion of Brindlee Mountain.

Following the War, many Southerners found themselves in unpleasant and difficult circumstances. Many had lost their money and households, and that part of Georgia through which General Sherman's army had marched was almost completely devastated. Many families decided to move on and try to start a new life elsewhere. Ira Roe Foster was one of those and he decided to move his family to Alabama around 1867. He invited a number of friends to join him and they settled on that part of Brindlee Mountain which lies east of 'Long Hollow' and was at that time largely uninhabited wilderness. They called the area "Georgia Mountain", in honor of the beloved state they had left behind. While there appear to have been inhabitants of some parts of Georgia Mountain for some years prior to the Civil War, its main settlement and its name came afterwards.

The 11 families who migrated with the Fosters were the Alford, Bolding, Brown, Eubanks, Evans, Fielding, Hilburn, McMinn, Malone, Rainwater and Turner families. They settled an area that until then had been an uninhabited wilderness, and was decidedly rural despite being situated just a few miles from Guntersville.

Ira Foster established a landing on the river near the present Guntersville Dam known as "Foster's Landing" and built a sawmill to provide the lumber needed for building homes and businesses. A road led from Foster's Landing up to the top of the mountain. For several years all the settlement's supplies came on the Tennessee River to the landing and were carried up the mountain on wagons via that route – that road has ceased to exist.

Many of the residents on the mountain farmed the rich "bottoms" along the river (now under Guntersville Lake), going up and down the mountain daily. The road was finally extended down the other side of the mountain to Guntersville when Foster requested Gov. Brown of Georgia to send him an engineer. The engineer was Albert M. Ayres, Sr. who married Foster's daughter and made the mountain his home. That road was eventually paved in the 1960s with only one curve removed, and continues to be one of the main roads to access the mountain.

Those families decided they must organize a church and establish a school. The first meeting house was built of logs near where the Mt. Carmel cemetery is today. They were officially recognized in June 1867 and named Mt. Carmel Baptist Church. That name was chosen because it was the name of the church many of the organizers had belonged to in Georgia.

Another 'meeting house' was built somewhere around 1872 and was used by both the Baptists and Methodists. During the early years that building also served as a community meeting place.

Eventually a school was built with two classrooms. A third room was added later. It operated until sometime in the 1950s.

The Methodist Church was organized on Georgia Mountain in 1872 and was first known as Mason's Chapel, though the name has since been changed to Bethel Church, and somewhere along the way, Grace Church was formed.

At one time there was a post office on Georgia Mountain called "Beard". Arthur Campbell Beard had come from Pennsylvania in the early 1800s and had settled Beard's Bluff on the Tennessee River just west of Guntersville (later known as Street's Bluff).

Crank-type phones arrived on the mountain sometime in the first half of the twentieth century. Electric power was first run to the mountain by Alabama Power in the 1930s. In 1947 power came from Arab Electric. Water lines finally arrived from Arab Water in 1973-74. Natural gas arrived 2011-12.

In 2022 the main roads on the mountain are paved and growth continues.
