= 97th Indiana Infantry Regiment =

97th Regiment, Indiana Infantry
- Active: 1862-1865
- Country: United States of America
- Allegiance: Union
- Branch: United States Army
- Type: Regiment
- Role: Infantry
- Nickname: None
- Engagements: Vicksburg Campaign

Commanders
- Notable commanders: Robert Francis Catterson

The 97th Regiment, Indiana Volunteer Infantry was an infantry regiment that served in the Union Army during the American Civil War. Organized in southwestern Indiana in 1862, the regiment saw action throughout the South at the siege of Vicksburg, the Battle of Atlanta and Sherman's March to the Sea. They were mustered out June 9, 1865, in Washington, D.C. after a victorious parade through Washington.

== Engagements ==
- Battle of Griswoldville
- Battle of Bentonville
- Battle of Vicksburg
- Battle of Chattanooga
- Battle of Noonday Creek
- Battle of Atlanta
- Sherman's March to the Sea
- Carolinas campaign

== Commanders ==
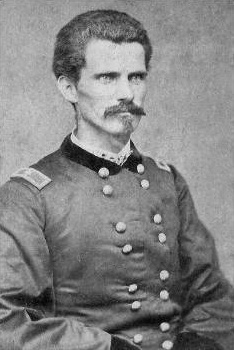
Robert F. Catterson, 1865

- Robert Francis Catterson

== See also ==
- List of Indiana Civil War regiments
