= Robert Francis Catterson =

American military officer and politician

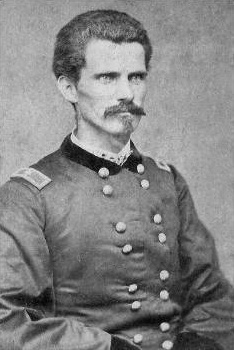
- Catterson in uniform, 1865

30th Mayor of Little Rock, Arkansas
- In office November 13, 1871 – November 10, 1873
- Preceded by: Jefferson G. Botsford (acting)
- Succeeded by: Frederick Kramer

Personal details
- Born: March 22, 1835 Marion County, Indiana, U.S.
- Died: March 30, 1914 (aged 79) San Antonio, Texas, U.S.
- Cause of death: Stroke
- Resting place: San Antonio National Cemetery; 29°25′17.8″N 98°28′01.7″W
- Party: Republican

Military service
- Allegiance: United States
- Branch/service: United States Volunteers
- Years of service: 1861–1866
- Rank: Brevet Brigadier-General
- Battles/wars: American Civil War

Robert Francis Catterson (March 22, 1835 – March 30, 1914) was a medical doctor, Union Army officer in the American Civil War, state legislator, militia officer, U.S. Marshal, and the 30th mayor of Little Rock, Arkansas (from 1871 to 1873). During the American Civil War, he was a senior officer of the Union Army and served as a brigade commander in the Army of the Tennessee.

== Early life and education ==
Catterson was born on March 22, 1835, in Marion County, Indiana. He was educated at Adrian College in Michigan and Cincinnati Medical College in Ohio, precursor to the University of Cincinnati Academic Health Center. After completing his studies, Catterson established a medical practice in Rockville, Indiana.

== American Civil War ==
When the American Civil War began in 1861, Catterson sided with the Union, gave up his medical practice, and volunteered to serve in the Union Army, enlisting in the 14th Indiana Infantry. On April 23 Catterson was mustered in as a private into Company A of the 14th, and on June 7 was promoted to first sergeant. Catterson was then elected as an officer and commissioned a second lieutenant on July 5. The following year he was promoted to first lieutenant on March 15, 1862.

In 1862 Catterson saw his first battle during the Valley Campaign, participating in the First Battle of Kernstown on March 23, and was promoted to captain on May 4. Catterson next fought during the Maryland Campaign and the Battle of Antietam on September 17, where he was wounded. Upon recovering, Catterson was appointed lieutenant colonel in the 97th Indiana Infantry on October 18, and its commander as colonel on November 25. Catterson and the 97th Indiana Infantry served the First Battle of Memphis in Tennessee on June 6, 1862, and the subsequent occupation of the city, until late in 1862. He then took part in the Siege of Vicksburg in the spring of 1863 and the Tullahoma Campaign that summer. Catterson and his command participated in the Third Battle of Chattanooga on November 23–25, and the Atlanta campaign throughout the summer of 1864.

During Major-General William T. Sherman's March to the Sea in the winter of 1864, Catterson was part of the Army of the Tennessee, heading a brigade in its XV Corps beginning on November 22, 1864. He fought in the Carolinas campaign of 1865, participating in the Battle of Bentonville in North Carolina on March 19–21, the fight considered the last major engagement of the American Civil War.

Also during the Carolinas Campaign, Catterson served very briefly as chief of staff to Major-General John A. Logan, the commander of the XV Corps. He then returned to his brigade, leading it for the rest of the campaign and to the end of the war. Catterson was brevetted to brigadier-general in the Union Army on May 31, 1865, and was mustered out of the volunteer service on January 15, 1866.

== Later life ==
After the American Civil War, Catterson chose not to return to the practice of medicine; he moved to Arkansas, where he tried and failed at cotton speculation. He then became commander of the Arkansas's negro militia under Governor Powell Clayton, engaged in fighting against the Ku Klux Klan and defending freedmen, and also as a U.S. Marshal. During Clayton's successful political run for the U.S. Senate, Catterson was removed as marshal when he lost the favor of Clayton, and replaced by Isaac Mills. Catterson would later command Brooks's militia, during the Brooks–Baxter War (April – May 1874).

Catterson was the mayor of Little Rock, Arkansas, from 1872 to 1874. After serving as mayor, he moved to Minnesota, where he was unsuccessful as both a farmer and a farm implement merchant. He died at the age of 79 at the Veterans' Hospital in San Antonio, Texas, after suffering from a stroke.

== See also ==
- List of Union Army generals

== Notes ==
Political offices
Preceded by Jefferson G. Botsford; Acting	Mayor of Little Rock, Arkansas; 1871–1873	Succeeded by Frederick Kramer
