= Lorenzo English =

American politician

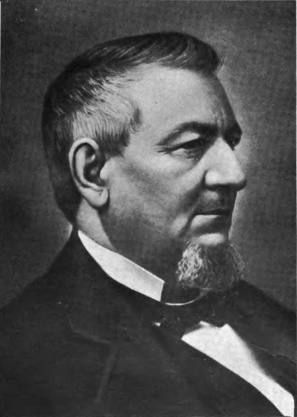

20th Mayor of Columbus
- In office 1850–1861
- Preceded by: Alexander Patton
- Succeeded by: Wray Thomas

Personal details
- Born: May 22, 1819 Herkimer County, New York
- Died: March 14, 1888 (aged 68)
- Resting place: Green Lawn Cemetery; Columbus, Ohio
- Party: Whig; Republican
- Spouse(s): Cynthia A. Cole; Mary Keane
- Children: William Henry; Matthew Keane; Walter; Lorenzo; Laura
- Parent(s): John English; Laura S. English
- Education: Oberlin College
- Profession: Mayor; Attorney

Lorenzo English (May 22, 1819 – March 14, 1888) was a Whig and later Republican politician from the U.S. state of Ohio. He served as the 20th mayor of Columbus, Ohio and the 18th person to serve in that office. He served Columbus prior to the American Civil War for five terms spanning eleven years. His successor was Wray Thomas after 1861.

== Biography ==
He was born in Herkimer County, New York on May 22, 1819. His parents were John and Laura S. English. He attended the public schools in Herkimer county. In 1837, his family moved to Mount Vernon, Ohio, then later to Columbus, Ohio. He attended Oberlin College and graduated in August 1843.

== Legacy and depictions ==
- Lorenzo is depicted as a ghost and a "shadow man" in The Dead Files, an American paranormal television series, in Season 3, episode 11 titled, "Blood in the Bordello". The television program was filmed at The Jury Room, a local pub in Columbus, Ohio. The pub serves an alcoholic drink called Lorenzo's Revenge named after the former mayor.

== Bibliography ==
- A Centennial Biographical History of the City of Columbus and Franklin County, Ohio. County and regional histories of the "Old Northwest.": Ohio. Lewis Publishing Company. 1901.
- Egger, Charles, ed. (1975). Columbus Mayors (PDF). Columbus, Ohio: Columbus Citizen-Journal.
- Reed, George Irving; Randall, Emilius Oviatt; Greve, Charles Theodore (1897). Bench and Bar of Ohio: A Compendium of History and Biography. Vol. 2. Chicago, Illinois: The Century publishing and engraving company.
- Tigges, Jesse (June 6, 2013). "The Jury Room, 32 Must-drink Summer Cocktails From Columbus Bars". Columbus Alive. Columbus, Ohio: The Dispatch Printing Company. p. 48. Archived from the original on 10 November 2013.

Political offices
Preceded by Alexander Patton	Mayor of Columbus, Ohio; 1850–1861	Succeeded by Wray Thomas
