= Alexander Patton =

American politician

17th and 19th Mayor of Columbus
- In office 1847–1849
- Preceded by: Augustus S. Decker
- Succeeded by: Lorenzo English
- In office 1845–1845
- Preceded by: Smithson E. Wright
- Succeeded by: Augustus S. Decker

Personal details
- Born: March 27, 1791 Hanoverton, Pennsylvania
- Died: February 19, 1857 (aged 65)
- Resting place: Green Lawn Cemetery; Columbus, Ohio
- Spouse(s): Elizabeth Carns; Nancy Green
- Children: Gustavus; 10 others
- Profession: Mayor; Justice of the Peace; Carpenter

Alexander Patton (March 27, 1791 – February 19, 1857) was the 17th mayor and 19th mayor of Columbus, Ohio. He was also the 16th person to serve in that office. He served Columbus four years during non-consecutive terms. His successor after 1845 was Augustus S. Decker and after 1849 was Lorenzo English.

== Bibliography ==
- Egger, Charles, ed. (1975). Columbus Mayors (PDF). Columbus, Ohio: Columbus Citizen-Journal.
- Miller, C. L. (2008). Mount Calvary Cemetery. Images of America. Arcadia Publishing. ISBN 9780738552057.

Political offices
Preceded by Augustus S. Decker	Mayor of Columbus, Ohio; 1847–1849	Succeeded by Lorenzo English
Preceded by Smithson E. Wright	Mayor of Columbus, Ohio; 1845–1845	Succeeded by Augustus S. Decker
