= Allen W. Thurman =

American eugenicist (1847–1922)

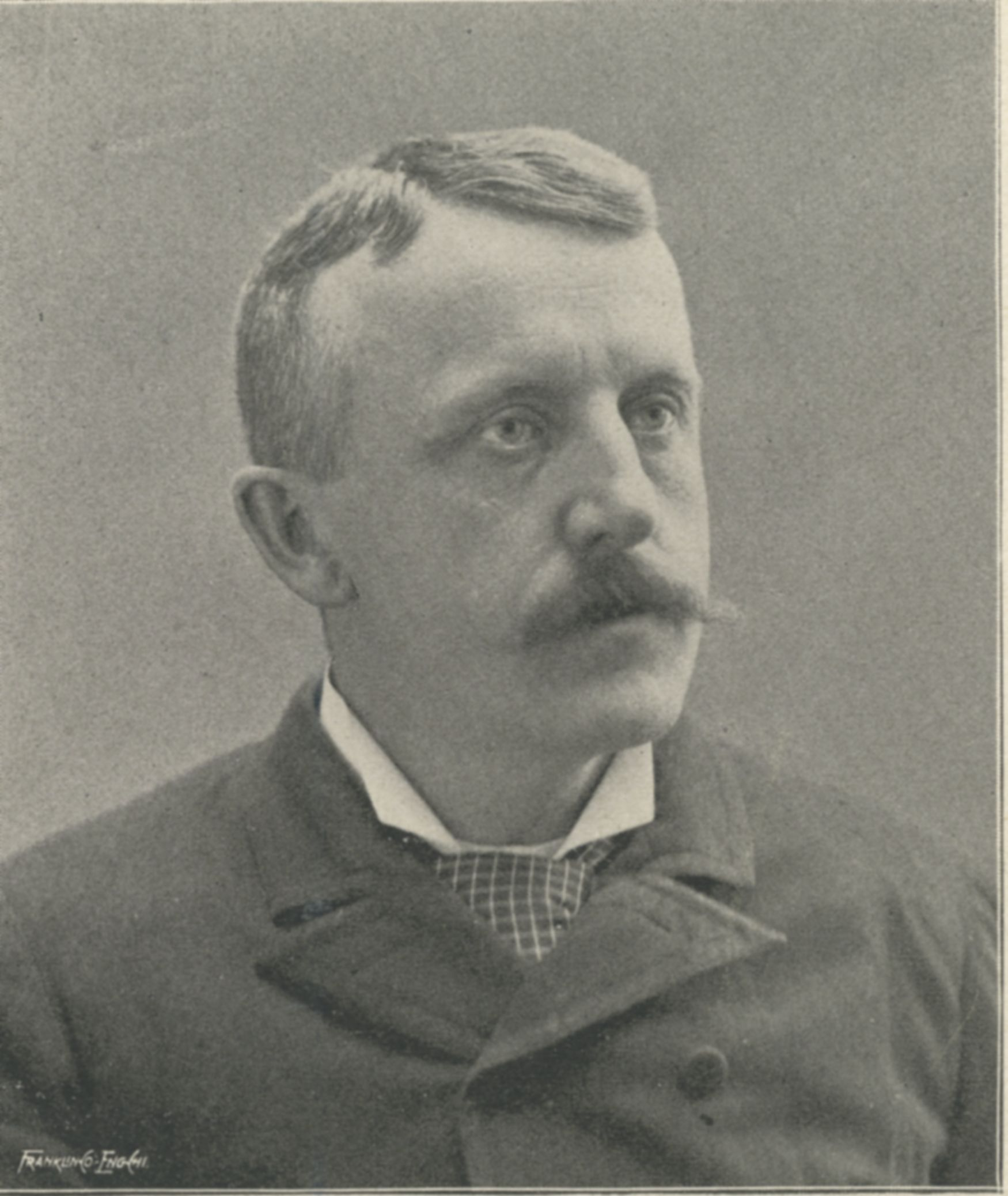
- Born: Allen William Thurman; May 18, 1847; Chillicothe, Ohio, U.S.
- Died: November 15, 1922 (aged 74) near Linden, Ohio, U.S.
- Resting place: Green Lawn Cemetery
- Occupations: Politician; baseball executive; writer
- Political party: Democratic
- Spouse: Harriet Webb (m. 1868)
- Children: 6
- Father: Allen G. Thurman

Allen William Thurman (May 18, 1847 – November 15, 1922) was an American politician and baseball executive from Ohio. He ran for the Democratic nomination for Governor of Ohio in 1889 with eugenicist ideas.

== Early life ==
Allen William Thurman was born on May 18, 1847 in Chillicothe, Ohio, to Mary A. (née Dun) and Allen G. Thurman. His father was a U.S. senator. At a young age, he worked as a secretary to his father.

== Career ==
In 1875, Thurman was a trustee of Deer Creek Township, Madison County, Ohio. In 1889, he sought the Democratic nomination for Governor of Ohio. As a eugenicist he argued that "unless Ohio takes prompt measures to stop the production of imbeciles, within ten years it will be bankrupted by the cost of maintaining this part of its population."

He was president of the American Association in 1890 and 1891 where he was known as "The White Winged Angel of Peace", so called because he helped negotiate the end of the labor strife that had resulted in the formation of the Players' League and the weakening of the finances of organized baseball. He was replaced by Louis Kramer.

In 1896, Thurman championed the free silver movement in Ohio. Under Governor George K. Nash, he was a member of the state canal commission. Under Governor Judson Harmon, he was one of the original members of the Ohio Board of Administration. He served as president of the body in 1912.

Thurman wrote in journals and periodicals about the free silver movement and economic ideas. He purchased 1,000 acres (400 ha) (including 500 acres (200 ha) of timber) of land in Madison County, Ohio, after his mother's death. In Madison County, he owned farmland, and a stable that he used to train racehorses.

== Personal life ==
In 1872, Thurman had his left hand amputated following an accident with a corn husker.

Thurman married Harriet Webb of Baltimore in October 1868. They had four sons and two daughters, A. Lee, Allen G., Tod Deford, Sterling, Katherine De Ford and Mrs. Virginia Cole. His daughter Katherine married Frederick Nicholas Sinks, attorney and private secretary to Governor George K. Nash.

Thurman died following a fall on November 15, 1922, aged 74, at the home of his daughter at Sunbury Pike near Linden, Ohio. He was buried at Green Lawn Cemetery in Columbus.
