= Abram Irvin McDowell =

Former mayor of Columbus, Ohio

15th Mayor of Columbus
- In office 1842–1842
- Preceded by: Thomas Wood
- Succeeded by: Smithson E. Wright

Personal details
- Born: 1793 Kentucky, US
- Died: November 16, 1844 (aged 51) Columbus, Ohio, US
- Resting place: Green Lawn Cemetery, Columbus, Ohio
- Spouse: Eliza Seldon Lord
- Children: Irvin McDowell; John Adair McDowell
- Profession: Mayor; Franklin County Recorder; Court Clerk

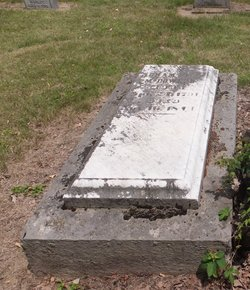
Abram Irvin McDowell’s gravestone

Abram Irvin McDowell (1793–1844) was the 15th mayor of Columbus, Ohio. He was the 14th person to hold the office, and served for less than one year. His successor was Smithson E. Wright. There are no existing images of Abram I. McDowell alive.

== Life ==
Abram Irvin McDowell was born on April 24, 1793, in Mercer County, Kentucky, to Col. Samuel McDowell, Jr. and Anne (Irvine) McDowell. He had two brothers, John Adair and William Adair McDowell.

McDowell was married to Eliza Selden (Lord) McDowell. The couple had seven children.

He died on November 16, 1844, in Columbus, Ohio. He is buried at Green Lawn Cemetery in Columbus, Ohio.

== Bibliography ==
- Egger, Charles, ed. (1975). Columbus Mayors (PDF). Columbus, Ohio: Columbus Citizen-Journal.
- Powers, Scott (December 29, 1991). "Lashutka, Rinehart to Dedicate Hall of Mayors". The Columbus Dispatch. Columbus, Ohio: The Dispatch Printing Company. p. 01B.

Political offices
Preceded by Thomas Wood	Mayor of Columbus, Ohio; 1842–1842	Succeeded by Smithson E. Wright
