= Smithson E. Wright =

American politician

16th Mayor of Columbus
- In office 1843–1844
- Preceded by: Abram I. McDowell
- Succeeded by: Alexander Patton

Personal details
- Born: 1807 Belmont County, Ohio
- Died: 1891 (aged 83–84)
- Party: Whig
- Spouse: Matilda Martin
- Profession: Mayor; Merchant; Franklin County Auditor; Treasurer; Teacher

Smithson E. Wright (1807–1891) was the 16th mayor of Columbus, Ohio. He was the 15th person to hold the office, and did so for one two-year term. He was succeeded by Alexander Patton in 1833.

== Life ==
Smithson E. Wright was born to Joseph and Eleanor (née Evans) Wright in Belmont County, Ohio, in 1807.

On August 27, 1832, he married Matilda Martin.

Wright died on March 2, 1891, in Cincinnati, Ohio.

== Bibliography ==
- Egger, Charles, ed. (1975). Columbus Mayors (PDF). Columbus, Ohio: Columbus Citizen-Journal.

Political offices
Preceded by Abram I. McDowell	Mayor of Columbus, Ohio; 1843–1844	Succeeded by Alexander Patton
