= Joseph Rockwell Swan (politician) =

American judge (1802–1884)

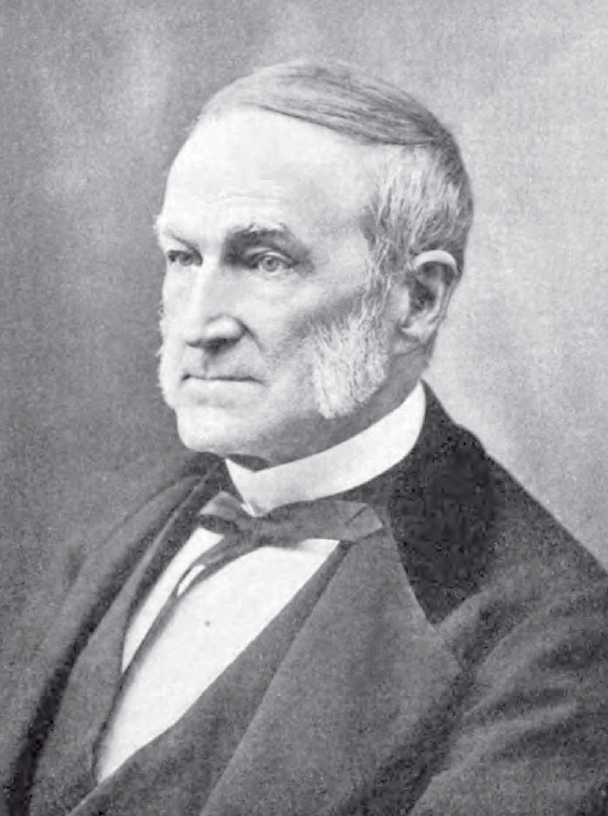

Associate Justice of the Ohio Supreme Court
- In office February 1855 – November 1859
- Preceded by: Robert B. Warden
- Succeeded by: William Y. Gholson

Personal details
- Born: December 28, 1802 Westernville, New York, U.S.
- Died: December 18, 1884 (aged 81) Columbus, Ohio, U.S.
- Resting place: Green Lawn Cemetery, Columbus, Ohio
- Party: Republican
- Spouse: Hannah Ann Andrews
- Children: Five

Joseph Rockwell Swan (December 28, 1802 – December 18, 1884) was a Republican politician in the U.S. State of Ohio who was a judge on the Ohio Supreme Court 1855–1860.

== Biography ==
Joseph Rockwell Swan was born at Westernville, Oneida County, New York. He studied at an academy in Aurora, New York, where he began the study of law. He moved to Columbus, Ohio in 1824, and studied law at the office of his uncle, Judge Gustavus Swan, where he was soon admitted to the bar.

Swan's first office was prosecuting attorney of Franklin County, to which he was appointed in 1830 by the judges of the Common Pleas. In 1833, a statute was passed which made the office elective, and in October of that year, the voters of Franklin County chose Swan. Within a year, the legislature chose him for judge of the Common Pleas Court, with a grueling circuit of Franklin, Madison, Clark, Champaign, Logan, Union, and Delaware counties, with the legislature electing him in 1834 and again in 1841.

Swan resigned from the court in 1845, and formed the partnership of Swan and Andrews in Columbus, with John W. Andrews as junior partner, until 1854. In 1850, the General Assembly passed an act calling a convention to revise or amend the constitution of the state of Ohio, and Judge Swan was elected as a delegate from Franklin County. In 1854 he won election to the Ohio Supreme Court.

== Ohio Supreme Court ==
In 1854, Swan ran for the Ohio Supreme Court as an Anti-Nebraska Party candidate, and defeated his Democratic opponent by 188,000 to 109,000. His most important decision came in 1859, and cost him re-nomination by the Republicans. This case involved Simeon Bushnell, who, along with Charles Langston, was convicted by the United States District Court for the Northern District of Ohio and imprisoned for rescuing a fugitive slave in an event known as the Oberlin–Wellington Rescue. The case was appealed to the Ohio Supreme Court, where Swan was in the majority of a 3-2 decision to deny release on grounds that the United States Supreme Court had found the Fugitive Slave Law of 1850 was constitutional. If they had ruled for release, Governor Chase was prepared to use the militia.^{To do what?} This may have precipitated the Civil War in Ohio that year. In closing, Swan contrasted his personal views with his need to adhere to the Constitution:

As a citizen I would not deliberately violate the Constitution or the law by interference with fugitives from service; but if a weary, frightened slave should appeal to me to protect him from his pursuers, it is possible I might momentarily forget my allegiance to the law and the Constitution, and give him a covert from those who were upon his track. There are, no doubt, many slaveholders who would follow the impulses of human sympathy; and if I did, and were prosecuted, condemned and imprisoned, and brought by my council before this tribunal on a habeas corpus, and were there permitted to pronounce judgment in my own case, I trust I should have the moral courage to say, before God and country, as I am now compelled to say, under the solemn duties of a judge, bound by my official oath to sustain the supremacy of the Constitution and the law, "the prisoner must be remanded".

— Joseph Rockwell Swan, 1859

This famous decision ended Swann's legal career, as he expected it would. Randall 1912: 135–136 Abolitionists in the Republican party saw to it that he was denied re-nomination at the party convention that year. He resigned in November 1859, a short time before his five-year term would have expired. He never again sought public office or practiced law. When Judge Gholson died in 1862 and passions had cooled somewhat, Governor Brough offered his seat on the Supreme Court to Swan, but he declined.

In 1860, Swan was chosen president of the Columbus and Xenia Railroad Company; he was also chief legal advisor of that company and of the Little Miami Railroad. In 1869 he was appointed general solicitor of the Pittsburgh, Cincinnati and St. Louis Railway Company, where he served for ten years, until failing health compelled resignation.

When Swan died at his home in Columbus in 1884, he left three sons and two daughters. His funeral was at Trinity Church, and burial was at Green Lawn Cemetery, Columbus, Ohio, next to his wife, Hanna Ann Andrews, originally from Rochester, New York, whom he had married in January 1833.

After Swan's death, the Franklin County Bar Association prepared a memorial, written by Richard A. Harrison, Allen G. Thurman, Chauncey N. Olds, and others. It read, in part:

On the bench of the Supreme Court he fully sustained his earlier reputation as a judge and probably held as high a place in the estimation of the bench, bar and the public, as has ever been reached by any of the distinguished men who have adorned our judicial history. Wise, patient, firm, impartial, courteous, he never lost sight of the dignity of his high office, to which he brought unusual native vigor of mind, large stores of learning, untiring industry, and the most conscientious regard for the rights of litigants, and abhorrence of all injustice and wrong.

— Columbus Bar

== Writings ==
According to the Ohio Supreme Court web site, Swan's legal guidebooks were "perhaps [his] most important contribution to Ohio jurisprudence". These were:

- A Treatise on the Law Relating to the Powers and Duties of Justices of the Peace (1836), called "the most useful book ever published in Ohio". There were twelve editions. Randall 1912: 138
- Statutes of 1841, made into an easy-to-use volume. Updates were published in 1854–55, 1860, and 1868.
- A Guide to Executors and Administrators (1843).
- Swan's Pleadings and Precedents, in two volumes (1845 and 1850).
- Swan's Pleadings and Precedents under the Code (1860).

== See also ==
- List of justices of the Ohio Supreme Court
