= Augustus Stoner Decker =

American politician

18th Mayor of Columbus
- In office 1846–1846
- Preceded by: Alexander Patton
- Succeeded by: Alexander Patton

Personal details
- Born: July 20, 1813 Reading, Pennsylvania
- Died: May 2, 1872 (aged 58) Columbus, Ohio
- Resting place: Green Lawn Cemetery; Columbus, Ohio
- Party: Whig
- Spouse: Martha L. Crum
- Profession: Retailer; Manufacturer; Mayor; Councilman

Augustus Stoner Decker (July 20, 1813 – May 2, 1872) was the 18th mayor of Columbus, Ohio during the year 1846. He was appointed mayor after Alexander Patton left the position early. Decker was born in Pennsylvania in 1813 and later moved to Columbus, Ohio with his family.

== Bibliography ==
- Egger, Charles, ed. (1975). Columbus Mayors (PDF). Columbus, Ohio: Columbus Citizen-Journal.
- Phillips, D. E. (January 1908). "Monumental Inscriptions from Green Lawn Cemetery, Columbus, Ohio". The "Old Northwest" Genealogical Quarterly. 11 (1). Columbus, Ohio: "Old Northwest" Genealogical Society: 60.
