= Governor Vance =

Governor Vance may refer to:

- Joseph Vance (Ohio politician) (1786–1852), 13th Governor of Ohio
- Zebulon Baird Vance (1830–1894), 37th and 43rd Governor of North Carolina
