= Matthias H. Nichols =

American politician

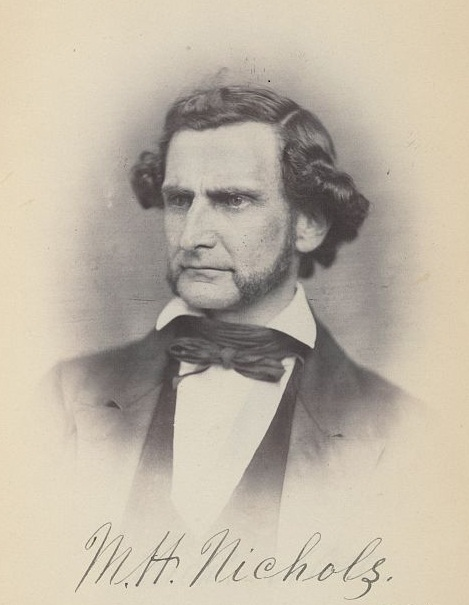
- in 35th Congress

Member of the U.S. House of Representatives from Ohio's 4th district
- In office March 4, 1853 – March 3, 1859
- Preceded by: Benjamin Stanton
- Succeeded by: William Allen

Personal details
- Born: October 3, 1824 Salem County, New Jersey, U.S.
- Died: September 15, 1862 (aged 37) Cincinnati, Ohio, U.S.
- Resting place: Woodlawn Cemetery, Lima
- Party: Democratic, Anti-Nebraska, Republican

Matthias H. Nichols (October 3, 1824 – September 15, 1862) was a U.S. representative from Ohio.

Born in Sharptown, New Jersey, Nichols attended the common schools. He later learned the trade of a printer then moved to Ohio in 1842 and settled in Lima, where he studied law. He was admitted to the bar in 1849 and commenced practice in Lima, Ohio.

Nichols was elected prosecuting attorney for Allen County in 1851, but resigned the following year to campaign for Congress.

Nichols was elected as a Democrat to the Thirty-third Congress, elected as an Anti-Nebraska candidate to the Thirty-fourth Congress, and reelected as a Republican to the Thirty-fifth Congress (March 4, 1853 – March 3, 1859). He was an unsuccessful candidate for reelection in 1858 to the Thirty-sixth Congress. He resumed the practice of his profession. He died in Cincinnati, Ohio, September 15, 1862. He was interred in the Old Cemetery, Lima, Ohio. He was reinterred in Woodlawn Cemetery.

== Sources ==
- United States Congress. "Matthias H. Nichols (id: N000093)". Biographical Directory of the United States Congress.

U.S. House of Representatives
Preceded by Benjamin Stanton	Member of the U.S. House of Representatives from Ohio's 4th congressional district 1853-1859	Succeeded by William Allen
