= Richard S. Canby =

American politician

Richard Sprigg Canby

Member of the U.S. House of Representatives from Ohio's 4th district
- In office March 4, 1847 – March 3, 1849
- Preceded by: Joseph Vance
- Succeeded by: Moses Bledso Corwin

Member of the Ohio House of Representatives from the Hardin & Logan County district
- In office December 1, 1845 – December 6, 1846
- Preceded by: John F. Henckle
- Succeeded by: William Lawrence

Personal details
- Born: September 30, 1808 Lebanon, Ohio
- Died: July 27, 1895 (aged 86) Olney, Illinois
- Resting place: Have Hill Cemetery
- Party: Whig
- Education: Miami University

Richard Sprigg Canby (September 30, 1808 – July 27, 1895) was a U.S. representative from Ohio.

Born in Lebanon, Ohio, Canby completed preparatory studies. He attended Miami University, Oxford, Ohio, from 1826 to 1828. He engaged in mercantile pursuits and while thus employed studied law. He was admitted to the bar about 1840 and commenced practice in Bellefontaine, Ohio. He served as member of the State house of representatives in 1845 and 1846.

Canby was elected as a Whig to the Thirtieth Congress (March 4, 1847 – March 3, 1849). He engaged in agricultural pursuits. Upon its formation in 1856 affiliated with the Republican Party. He moved to Olney, Illinois, in 1863, where he resumed the practice of law.

Canby was elected judge of the second judicial circuit court of Illinois in 1867 and served for several years. He again resumed the practice of his profession in Olney. Discontinued active business pursuits in 1882, and lived in retirement until his death. He died in Olney, Illinois, July 27, 1895. He was interred in Haven Hill Cemetery.

== Sources ==
- United States Congress. "Richard S. Canby (id: C000108)". Biographical Directory of the United States Congress.

U.S. House of Representatives
Preceded by Joseph Vance	Member of the U.S. House of Representatives from Ohio's 4th congressional district 1847–1849	Succeeded by Moses Bledso Corwin
