= 1867 Ohio gubernatorial election =

- October 8, 1867
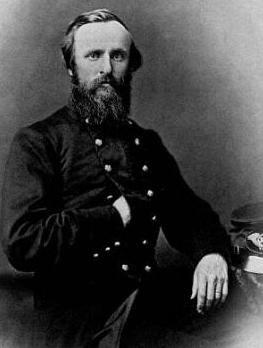

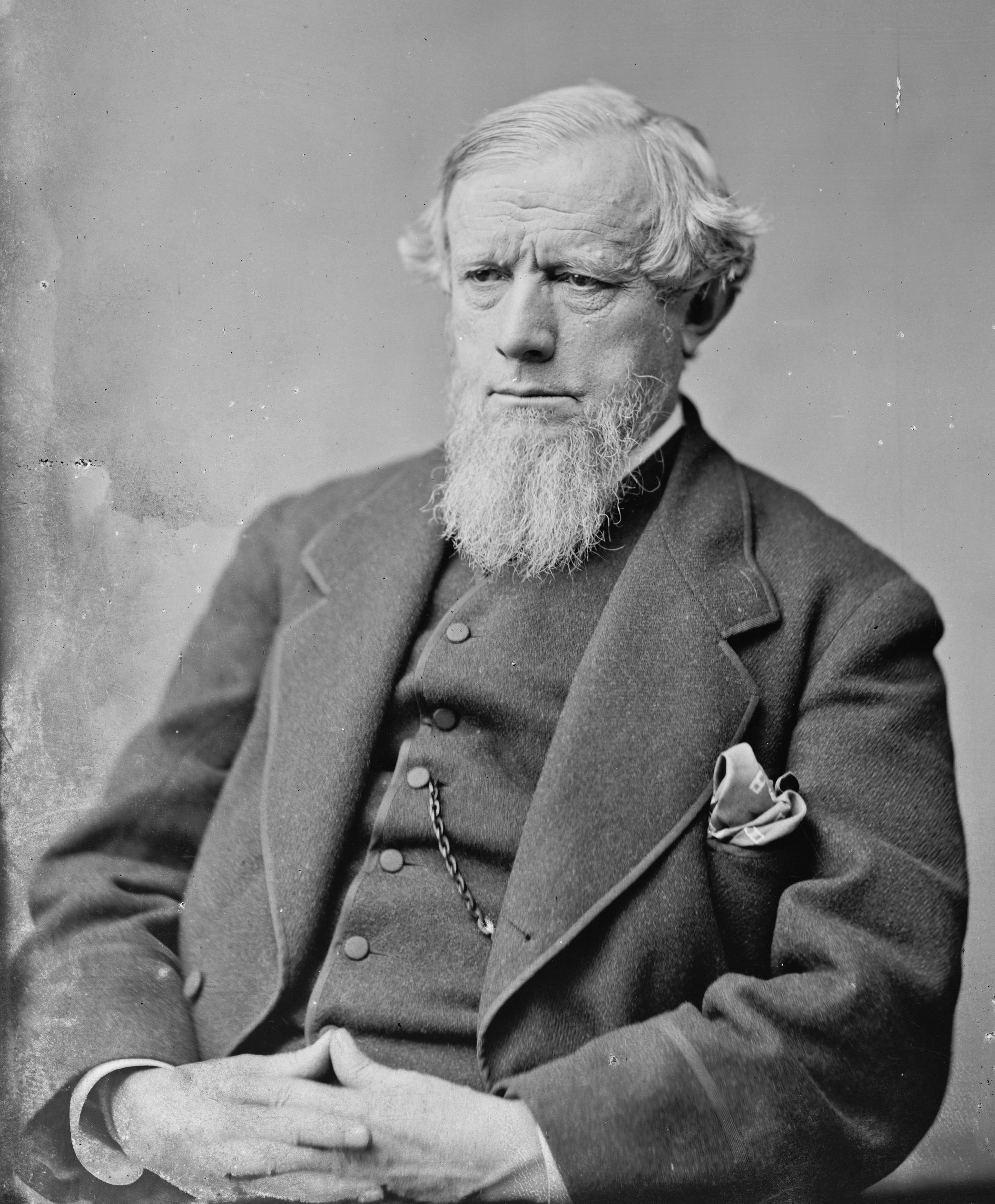
| Nominee | Rutherford B. Hayes | Allen G. Thurman |
| Party | Republican | Democratic |
| Popular vote | 243,605 | 240,622 |
| Percentage | 50.31% | 49.69% |
- County results Hayes: 50–60% 60–70% 70–80% 80–90% Thurman: 50–60% 60–70% 70–80% Tie: 50%
Governor before election
Jacob Dolson Cox
Republican
Elected Governor
Rutherford B. Hayes
Republican

The 1867 Ohio gubernatorial election was held on October 8, 1867. Republican nominee Rutherford B. Hayes defeated Democratic nominee Allen G. Thurman with 50.31% of the vote.

== General election ==
=== Candidates ===
- Rutherford B. Hayes, U.S. Representative from Cincinnati (Republican)
- Allen G. Thurman, former Chief Justice of the Ohio Supreme Court and U.S. Representative from Chillicothe (Democratic)

=== Results ===
1867 Ohio gubernatorial election
| Party | Candidate | Votes | % | ±% |
|---|---|---|---|---|
| Republican | Rutherford B. Hayes | 243,605 | 50.31% | |
| Democratic | Allen G. Thurman | 240,622 | 49.69% | |
| Majority | | 2,983 | | |
| Turnout | | | | |
| Republican hold | | Swing | | |
