= Allen G. Thurman =

American politician and judge (1813–1895)

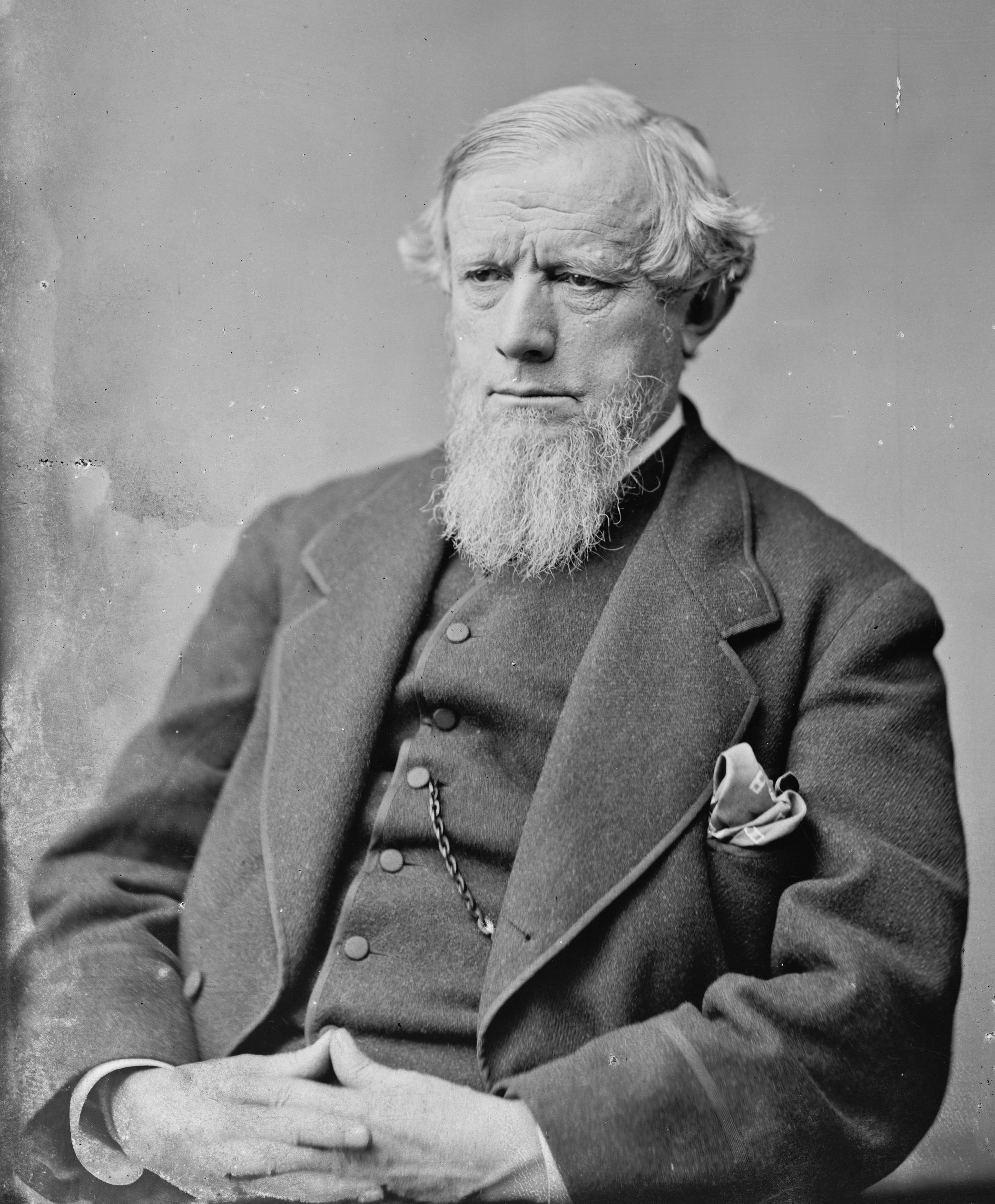
- Thurman, 1865–1880

President pro tempore of the United States Senate
- In office April 15, 1879 – December 5, 1880
- Preceded by: Thomas W. Ferry
- Succeeded by: Thomas F. Bayard

United States Senator from Ohio
- In office March 4, 1869 – March 3, 1881
- Preceded by: Benjamin Wade
- Succeeded by: John Sherman

Chief Justice of the Ohio Supreme Court
- In office December 4, 1854 – February 9, 1856
- Preceded by: John A. Corwin
- Succeeded by: Thomas W. Bartley

Associate Justice of the Ohio Supreme Court
- In office February 9, 1852 – December 4, 1854
- Preceded by: Peter Hitchcock
- Succeeded by: Charles Convers

Member of the U.S. House of Representatives from Ohio's 8th district
- In office March 4, 1845 – March 3, 1847
- Preceded by: John I. Vanmeter
- Succeeded by: John L. Taylor

Personal details
- Born: Allen Granberry Thurman; November 13, 1813 Lynchburg, Virginia, U.S.
- Died: December 12, 1895 (aged 82) Columbus, Ohio, U.S.
- Resting place: Green Lawn Cemetery
- Party: Democratic
- Spouse: Mary Dun Tompkins (m. 1844; died 1891)
- Children: 5, including Allen W.

Allen Granberry Thurman (Note: sometimes erroneously spelled Allan Granberry Thurman) (November 13, 1813 – December 12, 1895) was an American politician who served as a United States representative, Ohio Supreme Court justice, and United States senator. A Democrat, he unsuccessfully ran for vice president of the United States in 1888 as the running mate of President Grover Cleveland.

Born in Lynchburg, Virginia, he and his family moved to Chillicothe, Ohio, when Thurman was young. Thurman established a legal practice in Chillicothe with his uncle, William Allen, who later represented Ohio in the U.S. Senate. Thurman won election to the House of Representatives in 1844, becoming the youngest member of that body. He supported the James K. Polk administration during the Mexican–American War and voted for the Wilmot Proviso, which would have banned slavery from any territory gained from Mexico. He served a single term in the House before joining the Supreme Court of Ohio. He narrowly lost the 1867 Ohio gubernatorial election to Rutherford B. Hayes. He won election to the Senate in 1869, becoming an opponent to the Republican Reconstruction policy. He actively campaigned against African-American voting rights and worked to reverse the civil rights advances of Reconstruction. He offered an amendment to continue to segregate public schools in the District of Columbia. During the disputed 1876 presidential election, Thurman helped establish the Electoral Commission. Thurman lost re-election in 1881 as the Republicans had won control of the Ohio legislature.

Thurman was a "favorite son" candidate for president in 1880 and 1884. The 1888 Democratic National Convention selected him as President Grover Cleveland's running mate, as Vice President Thomas A. Hendricks had died in office. The aging Thurman did not actively campaign and the Democratic ticket was defeated.

== Early years ==
Allen Granberry Thurman was born in Lynchburg, Virginia, to Pleasant Thurman and Mary Granberry Allen Thurman. Both of his parents were teachers; his father also a Methodist minister. In 1815, his parents emancipated their slaves and moved to Chillicothe, Ohio. He attended Chillicothe Academy, an academy run by his mother, and then studied law as an apprentice to his uncle, William Allen (who later became a senator from Ohio). At the age of eighteen, Thurman worked on a land survey, and at twenty-one became private secretary to the Governor of Ohio, Robert Lucas. In 1835 he was admitted to the Ohio bar and became his uncle's law partner. In 1837 his uncle entered the Senate.

== Career in government ==
=== Congressman ===
The same year he was elected to the House of Representatives as its youngest member. He generally supported the majority of the Democrats on all issues except internal improvements, on which he tended to vote with the Whigs. He supported the Polk Administration's conduct of the Mexican–American War, spoke in favor of the 54°40' northern limit to the Oregon territory, and voted for the Wilmot Proviso, which would have banned slavery from the territory gained from Mexico. His support for the latter was due to anti-African-American prejudice, as he wanted to reserve this territory for white settlement. After a single two-year term, he left the House voluntarily to resume private law practice.

=== State Supreme Court Justice ===
In 1851 he was elected to a four-year term (February 1852 – February 1856) on the Ohio Supreme Court, the last year as the chief justice. He then returned to private law practice in Columbus. Thurman spoke out against the repeal of the Missouri Compromise and opposed the pro-slavery Lecompton constitution for Kansas. In 1860 he was a supporter of Stephen A. Douglas for President. A "peace Democrat" or "Copperhead," he never accepted the right of a state to secede but felt it was unwise to fight a state that had already left the Union, and during the American Civil War he was opposed to Lincoln's policies, especially on emancipation. While he supported the war effort, he encouraged compromise and a political settlement.

=== Candidate for Governor ===
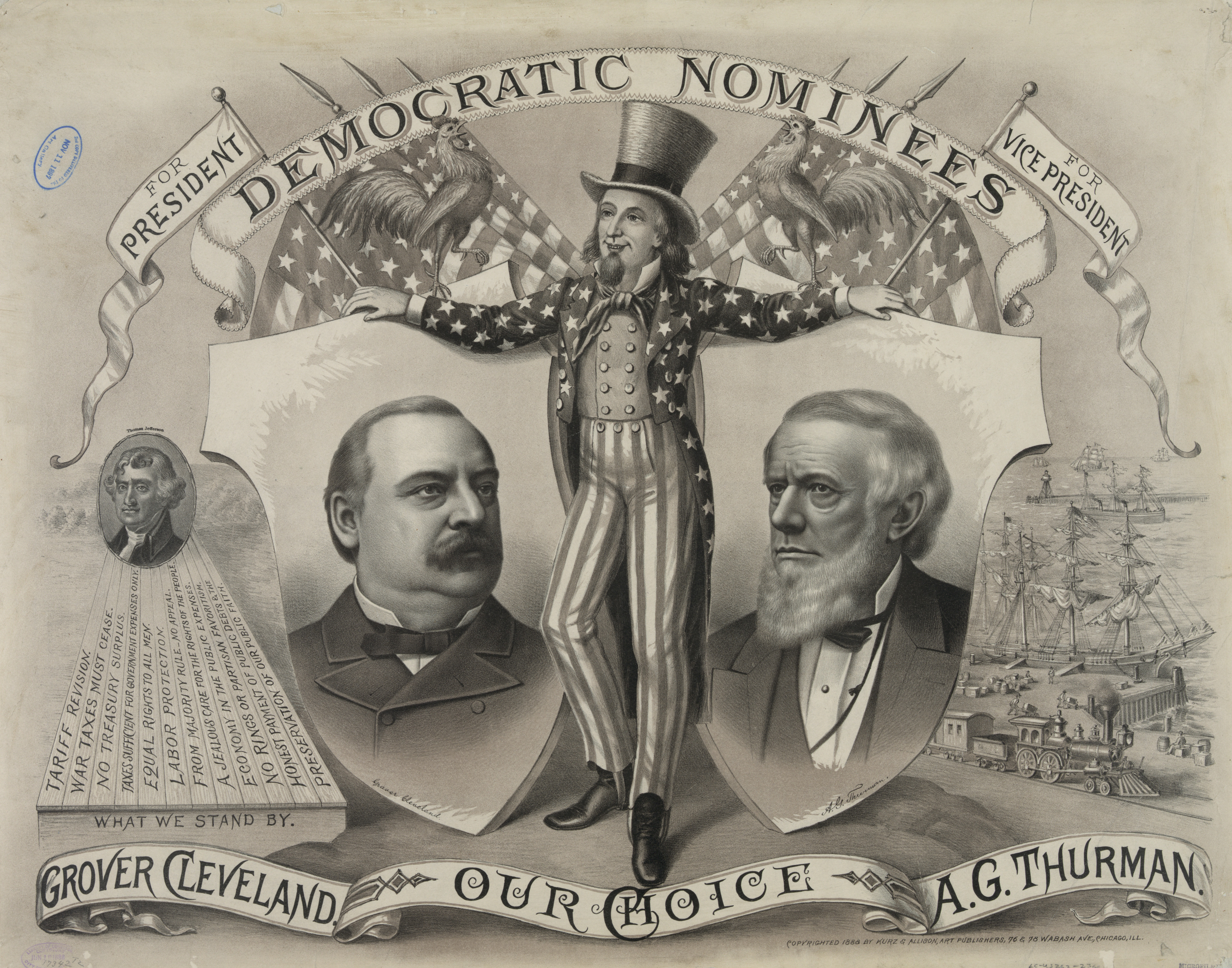
Cleveland/Thurman campaign poster

In 1867, he ran for Governor of Ohio, on a platform opposed to extending suffrage to blacks, but lost to future U.S. president Rutherford B. Hayes in a close election. Statewide Democrats including Thurman ran a banner under the slogan "No Negro Equality!"

During the campaign, Thurman appealed to white supremacist attitudes in virulent tones, vowing to fight "the thralldom of n*****ism." In Ohio, like most Northern states, black suffrage referendums failed to pass due to small fractions of Republican voters joining Democratic opposition. The issue thus became seized upon by Democratic politicians in race-baiting rhetoric.

=== U.S. Senator ===
The Ohio voters chose a Democratic state legislature, however, which selected Thurman as senator for the term beginning in 1869. He there became a strong opponent of the Republicans' Reconstruction measures. In 1873 Thurman crafted a strategy that led to Ohio choosing once more a Democratic legislature, and electing Thurman's uncle William Allen as governor. The legislature elected Thurman to another term in the Senate. During the twelve years he served in the Senate, he became the leader of the Democrats in that body. He was known for constant hard work, good preparation, and courteous treatment of his opponents, and other members ranked him among the top three senators of his time, in terms of ability. He came nearest, a Washington correspondent concluded, to "the beau ideal of a Senator of any man on his side of the House. He has fine passing power of cutting up his political opponents, saying a word of encouragement to some Republican when he is down, and scattering the caucuses of the opposite side with a pistol shot." His prepared speeches were clear and cogent, but it was in debate that he showed himself at his most picturesque. "He would wave his red bandana pocket handkerchief like a guidon, give his nose a trumpet-blast, take a fresh pinch of snuff, and dash into the debate, dealing rough blows, and scattering the carefully prepared arguments of his adversaries like chaff," a Washington long-time reporter remembered. He kept up a close friendship with his chief sparring partner on the opposite side, George F. Edmunds of Vermont. Journalists told how at a given signal—a long blow of his nose—he would get ready to exit the Senate so that the two could meet in the Judiciary Committee room to share a liberal amount of Kentucky Bourbon.

"When I speak of the law," Senator Roscoe Conkling of New York once said, "I turn to the Senator as the Mussulman turns towards Mecca. I look to him only as I would look to the common law of England, the world's most copious volume of human jurisprudence." In particular he made himself the critic of giveaways to the large railroad corporations and of Republicans' Reconstruction policies. "A fine juicy roast of land grants is what sends Thurman's tongue a-wagging," wrote one reporter.

An advocate of free trade, Thurman bemoaned of protective tariffs as a taxation upon "everything one wears from the crown of his head to the soles."

In the 1876–1877 electoral college crisis, he helped to arrive at the solution of creating the Electoral Commission to settle the controversy, and ultimately served as one of the members of the commission, as one of the five Senators (one of the two Senate Democrats, and one of the seven Democrats altogether). As a Democrat, he voted with the seven-member minority, in favor of the Samuel J. Tilden electors in all cases, but the Republican majority prevailed in all the votes, and Thurman's 1867 gubernatorial opponent, Rutherford B. Hayes (who had returned to the governorship by defeating Thurman's uncle), became president. One of the House of Representatives' members of the commission, fellow Ohioan James Garfield, was to become the president four years later, after being chosen by the now-Republican Ohio legislature to succeed Thurman. Both men were lifelong friends.

"To look at Thurman one would suppose that his favorite reading was "Foxe's Book of the Martyrs' and "Baxter's Saints' Rest,'" a reporter wrote, "for Thurman's face certainly carries a heavier pressure of solemnity to the square inch than any face I ever saw." In fact, he was a wide reader, fond of Voltaire, Chateaubriand, Renan, and the lighter French novels, and colleagues admitted him the best French scholar in the Senate. He had picked up French from one Monsieur Gregoire, a tutor in his childhood, and in retirement continued reading French novels in the original language.

In the Senate, Thurman served on the Judiciary Committee, becoming its chairman when the Democrats won control of the Senate in the 46th Congress. He became President pro tempore of the Senate on April 15, 1879, being the first Democrat to hold this position in nearly twenty years. He briefly served as president of the Senate because of the illness of Vice President William A. Wheeler, before Ohio chose a Republican legislature, which would not reelect Thurman. They first chose Garfield, but on his election to the Presidency, selected John Sherman to succeed Thurman beginning in 1881. Garfield did appoint Thurman as American representative to the international monetary conference in Paris, a selection that Republican senators welcomed: they regretted his departure from among them. It was noted that in twelve years in the chamber, he had never had an angry word with any colleague, and noted, too, that he left the Senate as poor as he had come to it.

=== Candidate for vice president ===
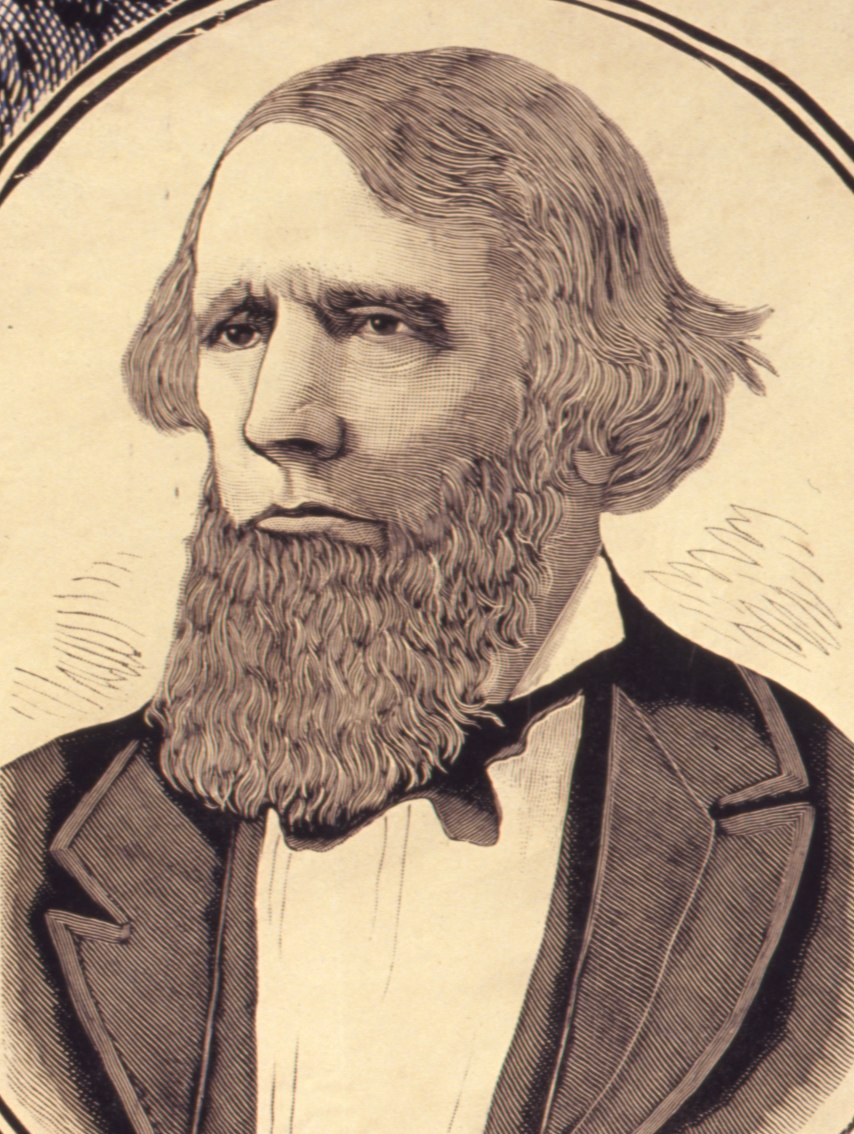
Allen Granberry Thurman from an 1888 poster.

Thurman spent his retirement reading French novels in the original language, playing whist, and amusing himself with mathematical problems; he had a reputation as one of the best mathematicians in Ohio. He was put forth as a favorite son candidate in the Democratic presidential nominating conventions in 1880 and 1884. In 1888, he was selected as President Grover Cleveland's running mate, because Vice President Thomas Hendricks had died in office in November 1885. Democrats turned his red bandana handkerchief into an emblem of the campaign, tying red bandanas to the top of canes in political parades, and manufacturing bandanas with the candidates' faces on them. Thurman's appeal came from his popularity among old-line Democrats, distrustful of Grover Cleveland's liberalism, and his known hostility to railroad monopolists. All the same, Thurman, who had retired from active politics, could not put on an active campaign, and added little to the ticket's chances.

Among the issues emphasized by the Cleveland/Thurman campaign included support for a reduction of taxes and protective tariffs.

In the concurrent 1884 United States Senate election in Ohio, Thurman did not oppose the campaign of incumbent Democratic senator George H. Pendleton, who faced opposition from the statewide party due to his sponsoring of the Pendleton Civil Service Reform Act that ended patronage politics in the United States.

When Cleveland was re-nominated for the presidency in June 1892, Thurman supported him but was not a candidate for vice president. Cleveland and running mate Adlai Stevenson went on to win the general election that November.

== Personal life ==
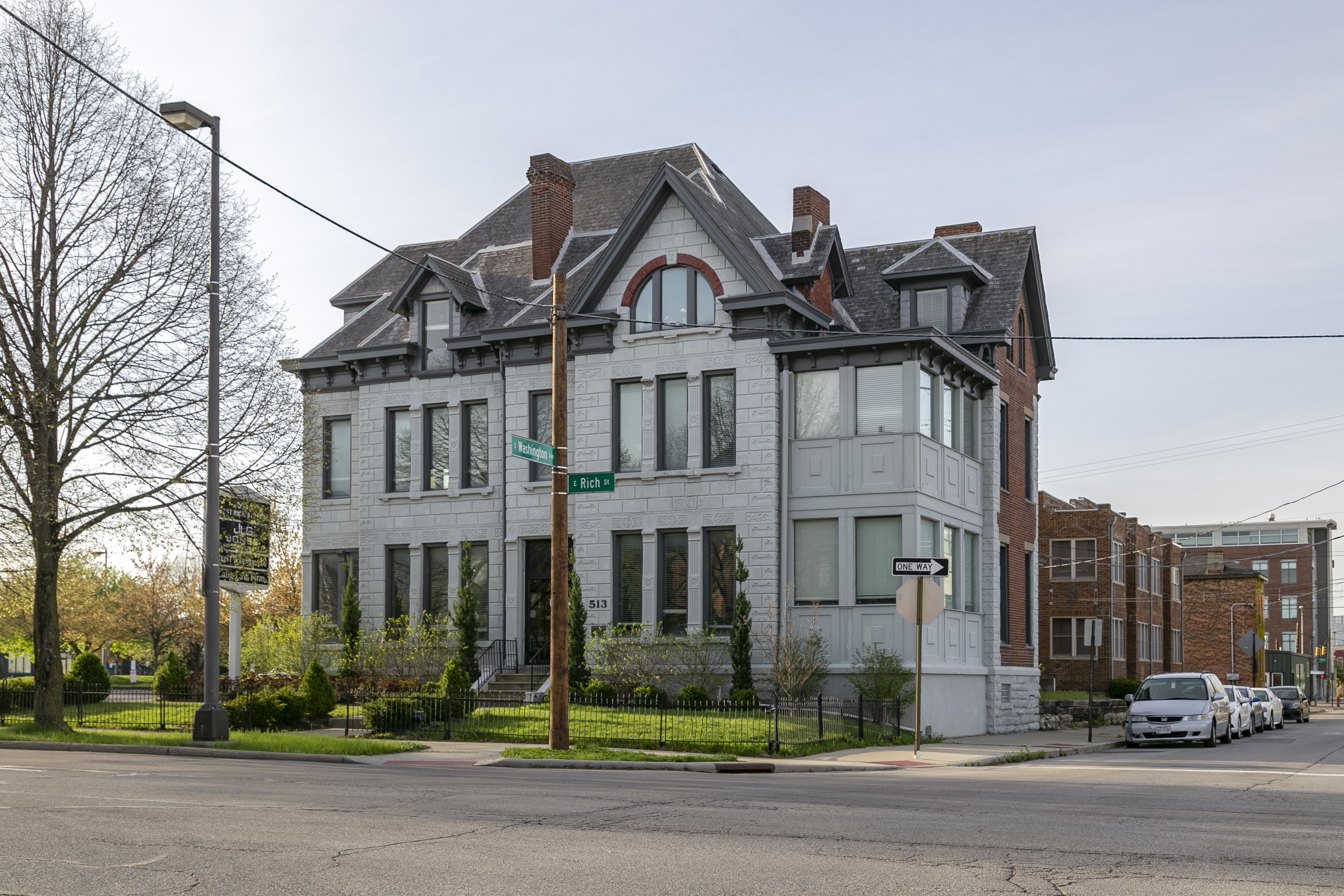
House in Columbus

On November 14, 1844, Thurman married Mary Anderson Dun Tompkins of Lexington, Kentucky. Her father was a wealthy landowner named Walter Dun, and she had been married until 1840 when her first husband died. Together, Thurman and his wife had five children, including:

- Allen W. Thurman, eugenicist and baseball executive
- Mary Thurman, who married William S. Cowles, Thomas Scott Gifford, and Bug Holliday
- Elizabeth Thurman, who married Arizona governor Richard Cunningham McCormick

He was known as the "Old Roman".

== Death and burial ==
Thurman died on December 12, 1895, at his home in Columbus and is buried at Green Lawn Cemetery.

== Legacy ==
Following the 2021 United States Capitol attack, Democrats charged that Donald Trump was responsible for the violence and sought to impeach and remove him from office. When the articles of impeachment passed the U.S. House of Representatives and reached the Senate, by which Trump already left office, Chuck Schumer of New York cited a resolution by Thurman against Ulysses S. Grant's Secretary of War William W. Belknap as a precedent for convicting Trump.

== See also ==
- Ohio History Connection

== Notes ==
U.S. House of Representatives
Preceded by John I. Vanmeter	Member of the U.S. House of Representatives from Ohio's 8th congressional district 1845–1847	Succeeded by John L. Taylor
Legal offices
Preceded by Peter Hitchcock	Associate Justice of the Ohio Supreme Court; 1852–1854	Succeeded by Charles Convers
Preceded by John A. Corwin	Chief Justice of the Ohio Supreme Court; 1854–1856	Succeeded by Thomas W. Bartley
U.S. Senate
Preceded by Benjamin Wade	U.S. Senator (Class 1) from Ohio; 1869–1881; Served alongside: John Sherman, Stanley Matthews, George H. Pendleton	Succeeded by John Sherman
Preceded by George F. Edmunds	Chair of the Senate Judiciary Committee; 1879–1881	Succeeded by George F. Edmunds
Party political offices
Preceded by George W. Morgan	Democratic nominee for Governor of Ohio; 1867	Succeeded by George H. Pendleton
Preceded by Thomas A. Hendricks	Democratic nominee for Vice President of the United States; 1888	Succeeded by Adlai Stevenson (I)
Political offices
Preceded by Thomas W. Ferry	President pro tempore of the United States Senate; 1879–1880	Succeeded by Thomas Bayard
