= William Allen (congressman) =

American politician (1827–1881)

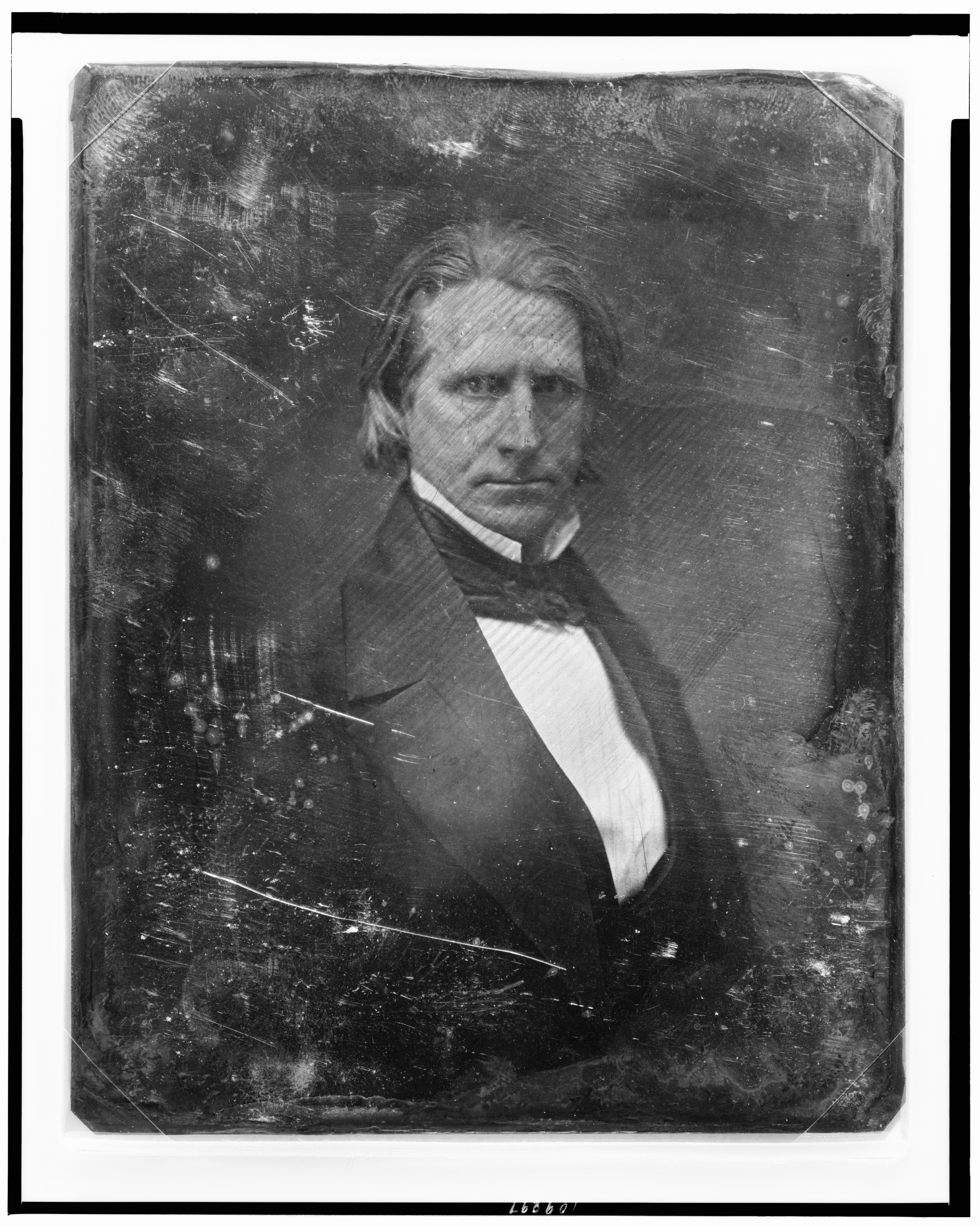

Member of the U.S. House of Representatives from Ohio's 4th district
- In office March 4, 1859 – March 3, 1863
- Preceded by: Matthias H. Nichols
- Succeeded by: John F. McKinney

Personal details
- Born: August 13, 1827 Hamilton, Ohio, U.S.
- Died: July 6, 1881 (aged 53) Greenville, Ohio, U.S.
- Resting place: Greenville Cemetery
- Party: Democratic; Republican

William Allen (August 13, 1827 – July 6, 1881) was a United States representative from Ohio during the early part of the American Civil War, serving two terms from 1859 to 1863.

== Early life and career ==
Allen was born near Hamilton, Ohio, where he attended the public schools. As a young man, he taught school, then studied law. Allen was admitted to the bar in 1849 and commenced practice in Greenville, Ohio, in 1850. He was the prosecuting attorney of Darke County from 1850 until 1854.

== Congress ==
Allen was elected as a Democrat to the Thirty-sixth and Thirty-seventh Congresses (March 4, 1859 – March 3, 1863), where he served as chairman, Committee on Expenditures in the Department of the Interior (Thirty-seventh Congress).

== Later career and death ==
He declined to be a candidate for renomination in 1862 and resumed the practice of law. He became affiliated with the Republican Party at the close of the Civil War and was appointed judge of the Court of Common Pleas of the second judicial district in 1865.

He declined the Republican nomination for election to the Forty-sixth Congress in 1878 because of failing health. He was interested in banking until his death in Greenville, Ohio, in 1881. He was buried in Greenville Cemetery.

U.S. House of Representatives
Preceded by Matthias H. Nichols	Member of the U.S. House of Representatives from Ohio's 4th congressional district 1859–1863	Succeeded by John F. McKinney
