= John A. Corwin =

American judge

Associate Justice of the Ohio Supreme Court
- In office February 9, 1852 – October 28, 1854
- Preceded by: new seat
- Succeeded by: Robert B. Warden

Personal details
- Born: October 26, 1818 Urbana, Ohio, U.S.
- Died: August 11, 1863 (aged 44) Urbana, Ohio, U.S.
- Resting place: Oak Dale Cemetery, Urbana
- Party: Democratic
- Spouse: Mary Vance
- Children: one

Military service
- Allegiance: United States
- Branch/service: Union Army
- Years of service: 1861
- Rank: Captain
- Unit: 13th Ohio Infantry

John A. Corwin (October 10, 1818 – August 11, 1863) was an American Democratic politician and jurist from Ohio. He was elected to the Ohio Supreme Court and ran unsuccessfully for the United States House of Representatives.

== Biography ==
Corwin was born in Urbana, Ohio, on October 26, 1818. His parents were Moses B. and Margaret Corwin. Moses Corwin first began practicing law in Champaign County and was the cousin of Thomas Corwin, Governor, Senator and Secretary of the Treasury.

After he finished school, Corwin ran a newspaper called the Rattler in about 1837 and studied law under his father. He was admitted to the bar at age 21 and established a law practice with his father in Urbana. They had clients throughout central Ohio, and John A. became a highly regarded criminal defense attorney. He started like his famous relatives as a Whig but switched to the Democratic Party in about 1840.

Moses Corwin had been in the Ohio House of Representatives and ran for Ohio's 4th congressional district as the Whig nominee in 1848. John A. decided to run as a Democrat against his father, and they had debates before immense crowds throughout the district. Moses won in the solidly Whig district. In 1850, John A. challenged Whig Benjamin Stanton in the same district and again lost convincingly.

In 1851, Ohio adopted a new constitution that made seats on the Ohio Supreme Court elective. The first election was in October 1851. Corwin was nominated by the Democrats, and the Democrats won all five seats. The new court was seated February 9, 1852, and the judges drew lots for a length of their first term, so re-elections would be staggered. Corwin drew a four-year term. In 1854, he challenged George E. Pugh for the Democratic nomination for United States Senate but lost. He did not serve his whole term but resigned on October 28, 1854.

After he resigned, Corwin returned to Urbana to practice law, spent 1857 in Cincinnati, Ohio, in practice with another former justice, Robert B. Warden, and returned to Urbana in 1858. In 1860, he supported the southern faction of the Democratic Party that nominated John C. Breckinridge but joined the 13th Ohio Infantry for three months service as a Captain on April 20, 1861, resigning before his three months were up.

Corwin suffered from tuberculosis for six months before he died at his Urbana home on August 11, 1863. He was buried at the cemetery in Urbana.

Corwin married Mary Vance, and they had one son.
