= Louis Kramer =

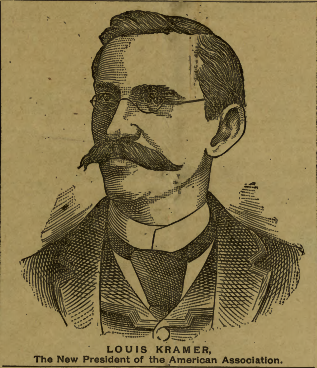
- Born: Louis C. Kramer; July 25, 1848; Cincinnati, Ohio, U.S.
- Died: August 18, 1922 (aged 74); Charlevoix, Michigan, U.S.
- Spouse: Emilie Stern
- Children: 2

Louis C. Kramer (July 25, 1848 - August 18, 1922) was a professional baseball executive who served as the president of the American Association in 1891.

== Career ==
Kramer, a lawyer, was one of the initial financial backers of the Cincinnati Red Stockings American Association club in 1881. He and club president Aaron S. Stern sold their shares to partner George Herancourt after the 1884 season. Kramer would remain a member of the clubs' board of directors.

He replaced Allen W. Thurman as president of the Association on February 18, 1891. Problems with finding suitable umpires, and the disbanding of the Cincinnati Kelly's Killers in August 1891, led to his resignation as president on August 18, effective September 1.

== Personal life ==
Kramer was married to Emilie Stern and had two daughters.

== Death ==
Kramer died on August 18, 1922, while he and his wife were vacationing at Charlevoix, Michigan.
