= Robert B. Warden =

American judge

Robert Bruce Warden

Justice of the Ohio Supreme Court
- In office December 9, 1854 – February 9, 1855
- Appointed by: William Medill
- Preceded by: John A. Corwin
- Succeeded by: Joseph Rockwell Swan

Personal details
- Born: January 18, 1824 Bardstown, Kentucky, U.S.
- Died: December 3, 1888 (aged 64) Washington, D.C., U.S.
- Party: Democratic
- Spouse: Catherine R. Kerdolff
- Children: two
- Education: Athenaeum

Robert Bruce Warden (January 18, 1824 – December 3, 1888) was a Democratic Party jurist in the U.S. state of Ohio who sat on the Ohio Supreme Court for a short time 1854–1855. He also authored biographies of Salmon P. Chase and Stephen A. Douglas.

== Biography ==
Robert B. Warden was born at Bardstown, Nelson County, Kentucky. At about age three, his family moved to Cincinnati, Ohio, where he was educated at the Athenaeum, a Roman Catholic college in the city.

Warden started study of law under Judge Reed in 1840, and later under Judge Walker. At age 17 he was deputy clerk of the Hamilton County Court of Common Pleas, and two years later clerk, until age 21, when he was admitted to the bar. In 1850, the Ohio Legislature elected him President Judge of the Court of Common Pleas, and under a new state constitution, he was elected to the same by the public in 1851. He resigned that position April 1852, and was named reporter of the Supreme Court of the State of Ohio that year.

In December, 1854, John A. Corwin resigned as judge on the Ohio Supreme Court, and Governor Medill named Warden to fill the seat. He served until February, 1855, when Joseph Rockwell Swan's term began. He ran for a different seat on the court later in 1855, but lost to his Republican opponent.

Warden returned to private practice in Ohio, where one author characterized him : "He was a man of exceptional ability, but did not possess the power to use it to the best advantage." Another noted : "He was well known as an elegant and forceful speaker, both before the courts and in political campaigns. In politics he was too independent and fearless to permit the 'machine' to influence his course, and this quality denied him the close affiliation with either of the great political parties."

In January, 1873, Warden moved to Washington, D. C., where he was employed at the request of Salmon P. Chase to write a biography of him. Chase died soon thereafter, and the book was published in 1874. Warden had also written a campaign book for Stephen A. Douglas, and other non-fiction works. He wrote the drama Arvoirlich (1857), also known as Was it Fate?.

Judge Warden practiced in Washington before the Supreme Court, and the Court of Claims, and at the State and Treasury Departments. In 1877, he was appointed a member and attorney for the Board of Health of the District of Columbia.

Warden married Catherine R. Kerdolff when he was nineteen years old. She died in Washington in 1884, and Warden died in Washington in 1888. He was survived by two daughters, and one adopted niece. The cause of his death was liver disease.

== Publications ==
- Warden, Robert B. (1874). An account of the private life and public services of Salmon Portland Chase. Cincinnati: Wilstach, Baldwin and Co.
- Warden, Robert B. (1860). A voter's version of the life and character of Stephen Arnold Douglas. Columbus, Ohio: Follett, Foster and Co.
- Warden, Robert B. (1860). A familiar forensic view of man and law. Columbus, Ohio: Follett, Foster and Co.

== Notes ==
Legal offices
Preceded by John A. Corwin	Ohio Supreme Court Judges; 12/1854-2/1855	Succeeded by Joseph Rockwell Swan
