= Moses Bledso Corwin =

American politician

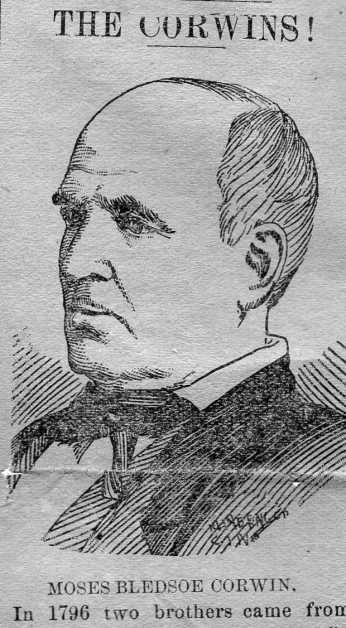

Member of the U.S. House of Representatives from Ohio
- In office March 4, 1849 – March 3, 1851
- Preceded by: Richard S. Canby
- Succeeded by: Benjamin Stanton
- Constituency: 4th district
- In office March 4, 1853 – March 3, 1855
- Preceded by: John L. Taylor
- Succeeded by: Benjamin Stanton
- Constituency: 8th district

Member of the Ohio House of Representatives from the Champaign County district
- In office December 3, 1838 – December 6, 1840
- Preceded by: Edward L. Morgan
- Succeeded by: W. C. Lawrence

Personal details
- Born: January 5, 1790 Bourbon County, Kentucky
- Died: April 7, 1872 (aged 82) Urbana, Ohio
- Resting place: Oak Dale Cemetery
- Party: Whig
- Spouse: Margaret
- Children: John A., Ichabod

Moses Bledso Corwin (January 5, 1790 – April 7, 1872) was a United States representative from Ohio.

== Biography ==
Born in Bourbon County, Kentucky, Corwin spent the early part of his life on a farm, and attended rural schools. He studied law, and was admitted to the bar in 1812. He began practicing law in Urbana, Ohio.

== Career ==
Corwin was a member of the Ohio House of Representatives in 1838 and 1839, and was elected as a Whig to the Thirty-first United States Congress (March 4, 1849 – March 3, 1851), and was again elected to the Thirty-third Congress (March 4, 1853 – March 3, 1855).

== Family life ==
Corwin's cousin, Thomas Corwin, was a U.S. representative, senator and treasury secretary; his cousin, Franklin Corwin, served one term as a representative; his son, John A. Corwin, was his Democratic opponent in the 1848 congressional election.

== Death ==
He engaged in the practice of law until his death at age 82. He was interred in Oak Dale Cemetery.

== Sources ==
- United States Congress. "Moses Bledso Corwin (id: C000790)". Biographical Directory of the United States Congress.
- Wilson, J. G.; Fiske, J., eds. (1900). "Corwin, Thomas" . Appletons' Cyclopædia of American Biography. New York: D. Appleton.

U.S. House of Representatives
Preceded by Richard S. Canby	Member of the U.S. House of Representatives from Ohio's 4th congressional district 1849-1851	Succeeded by Benjamin Stanton
Preceded by John L. Taylor	Member of the U.S. House of Representatives from Ohio's 8th congressional district 1853-1855	Succeeded by Benjamin Stanton
