= Robert F. Wolfe =

American businessman

According to biographies supplied by the Columbus Foundation and the Columbus Dispatch, entrepreneur Robert F. Wolfe arrived in Columbus, Ohio in 1888 and worked as a salesman for the Goodman Shoe company. After his brother Harry Preston joined him in Columbus (Harry was the shoemaker), they founded the Wolfe Brothers Wear U Well Shoe Company. In 1903, they bought the Ohio State Journal. The Columbus Evening Dispatch was purchased in 1905. Robert F. Wolfe was publisher of the Journal and the Dispatch until his death in 1927. Harry continued in the publishing and banking business until he died in 1946. Robert’s son, Edgar T. Wolfe, Sr., began working for the Journal in 1919 as an advertising solicitor. He later became co-publisher of both the Journal and the Dispatch. Edgar Wolfe also was a banker and civic leader who helped develop air travel at Port Columbus, promoted civic improvements, and supported the growth of hospitals. He died in 1957 at the age of 63.

John W. Wolfe, the son of Edgar T. Wolfe, began his career with Ohio National Bank in 1948. He became vice president and director of BancOhio Corporation in 1957. In 1975, he became chairman of the Dispatch Printing Company, parent organization of the Columbus Dispatch. Brandweek noted John W. Wolfe's penchant for conservatism: "Long after most papers had shed their political orientations, the Dispatch still served as a mouthpiece for the Republican politics of John W. Wolfe, chairman of parent company Dispatch Publishing. After the December 1985 demise of the city's other daily, The Columbus Citizen-Journal, the Dispatch had one less incentive to push itself. But with Wolfe's death in 1994, the paper began a complete transformation."
