= Benjamin Stanton =

American politician (1809–1872)

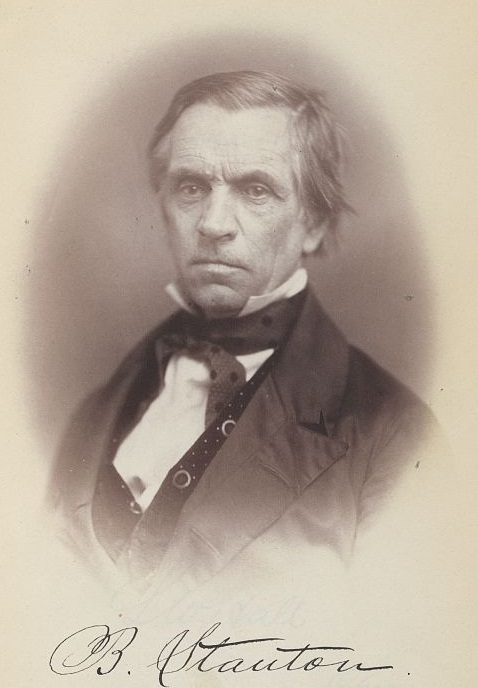
- in 35th Congress

Member of the U.S. House of Representatives from Ohio
- In office March 4, 1851 – March 3, 1853
- Preceded by: Moses Bledso Corwin
- Succeeded by: Matthias H. Nichols
- Constituency: 4th district
- In office March 4, 1855 – March 3, 1861
- Preceded by: Moses Bledso Corwin
- Succeeded by: Samuel Shellabarger
- Constituency: 8th district

6th Lieutenant Governor of Ohio
- In office January 13, 1862 – January 11, 1864
- Governor: David Tod
- Preceded by: Robert C. Kirk
- Succeeded by: Charles Anderson

Member of the Ohio Senate from the Champaign, Logan and Union Counties district
- In office December 6, 1841 – December 3, 1843
- Preceded by: Dowty Utter
- Succeeded by: John Gabriel Jr.

Personal details
- Born: June 4, 1809 Mount Pleasant, Ohio, U.S.
- Died: June 2, 1872 (aged 62) Wheeling, West Virginia, U.S.
- Resting place: Greenwood Cemetery
- Party: Whig, Anti-Nebraska, Republican

Benjamin Stanton (June 4, 1809 – June 2, 1872) was an American politician who served as the sixth lieutenant governor of Ohio from 1862 to 1864.

== Early life ==
The son of Elias & Martha (Wilson) Stanton, he was born in Mount Pleasant, Ohio, Stanton pursued academic studies, and learned the tailor's trade. Stanton studied law and was admitted to the bar in 1834, and began practicing law in Bellefontaine, Ohio.

== Career ==
Stanton served as a member of the Ohio Senate from 1841 to 1843, and as delegate to the state constitutional convention in 1850.

Stanton was elected as a U.S. Representative from Ohio twice. He served as a Whig to the Thirty-second Congress, from 1851 to 1853.

From 1855 to 1861, he was elected as an Anti-Nebraska candidate to the Thirty-fourth Congress, and reelected as a Republican to the Thirty-fifth and Thirty-sixth Congresses. Stanton served as chairman of the Committee on Military Affairs (Thirty-sixth Congress).

1860 speech to the U.S. House of Representatives on equality and slavery

Stanton served as lieutenant governor of Ohio in 1862, during the American Civil War. After the battle of Shiloh, in April 1862, at Pittsburg Landing, Tennessee, Stanton visited the Union Army and soon published a statement critical of the Union generals. He opined that Ulysses S. Grant and Benjamin M. Prentiss, both appointed from Illinois, should be court-martialed and shot. General William Tecumseh Sherman, appointed from Ohio, published a sharp rebuttal. This led to Stanton's criticizing Sherman as well. In his memoirs, Sherman claimed that after "the good people of the North ha(d) begun to have their eyes opened" (referring perhaps to his own rebuttals of Stanton) Stanton's criticisms of Grant were so soundly rejected that Stanton never again held any public office and that he was commonly spoken of as "the late Mr. Stanton". Stanton's move from Ohio to West Virginia would seem to support that statement.

Stanton moved to Martinsburg, West Virginia, in 1865, and practiced law. He moved to Wheeling, West Virginia, in 1867 and continued the practice of law.

== Death ==
Stanton died in Wheeling on June 2, 1872, two days before his sixty-third birthday, and was interred in Greenwood Cemetery in Wheeling, West Virginia.

U.S. House of Representatives
Preceded by Moses B. Corwin	Member of the U.S. House of Representatives from Ohio's 4th congressional district 1851-1853	Succeeded by Matthias H. Nichols
Preceded by Moses B. Corwin	Member of the U.S. House of Representatives from Ohio's 8th congressional district 1855-1861	Succeeded by Samuel Shellabarger
Political offices
Preceded by Rutherford B. Hayes	Lieutenant Governor of Ohio; 1862-1864	Succeeded by Richard M. Bishop
