= Joseph Vance (Ohio politician) =

United States general (1786–1852)

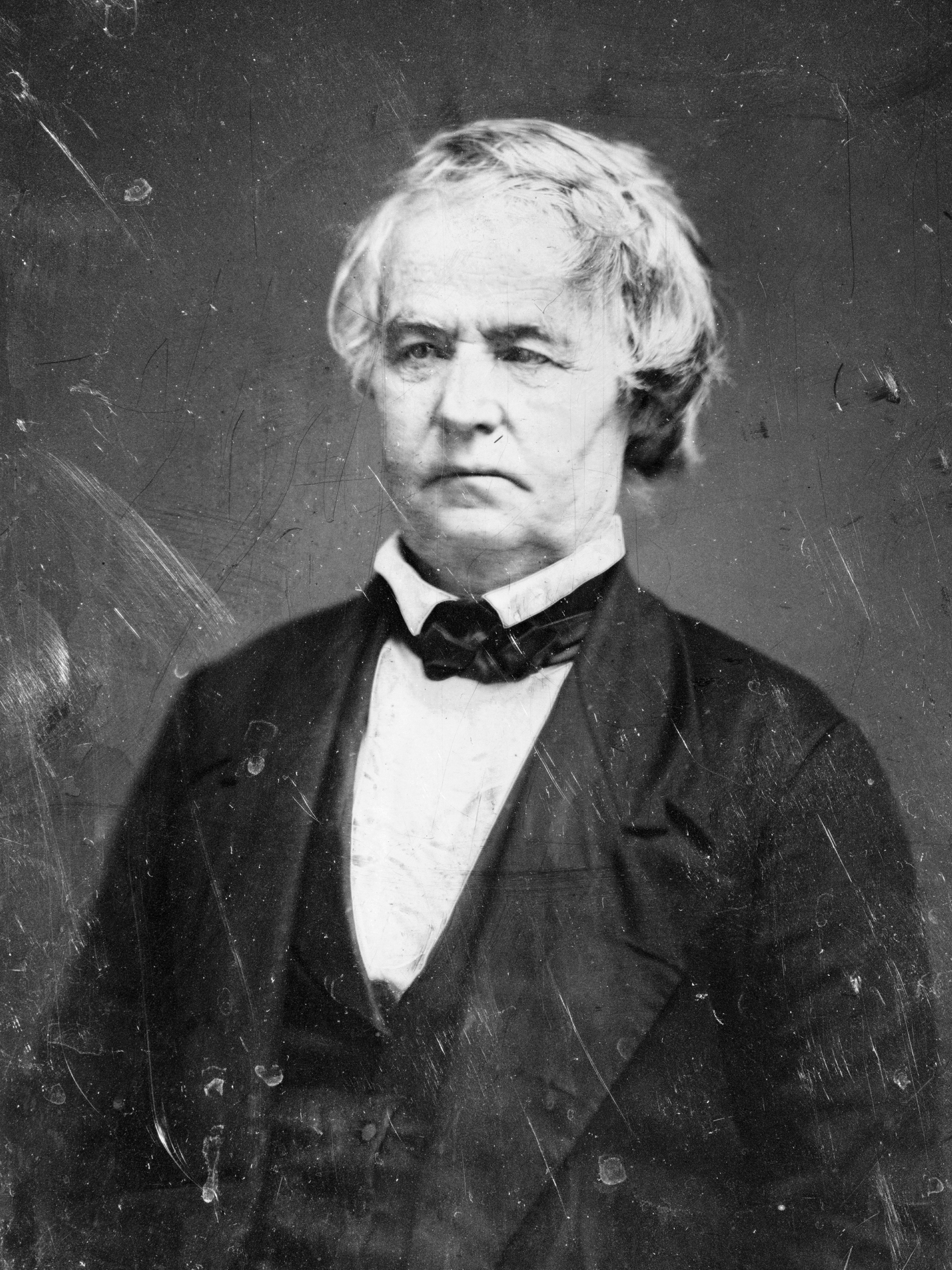

Member of the U.S. House of Representatives from Ohio
- In office March 4, 1821 – March 3, 1835
- Preceded by: Philemon Beecher
- Succeeded by: Samson Mason
- Constituency: 5th district (1821-1823); 4th district (1823-1833); 10th district (1833-1835)
- In office March 4, 1843 – March 3, 1847
- Preceded by: Jeremiah Morrow
- Succeeded by: Richard S. Canby
- Constituency: 4th district

13th Governor of Ohio
- In office December 12, 1836 – December 13, 1838
- Preceded by: Robert Lucas
- Succeeded by: Wilson Shannon

Member of the Ohio House of Representatives from Champaign County
- In office 1819–1820
- Preceded by: Aaron L. Hunt; Reuben Wallace
- Succeeded by: District eliminated

Member of the Ohio House of Representatives from Champaign, Logan and Clark counties
- In office 1815–1816
- Preceded by: Alexander McBeth; Samuel Newell
- Succeeded by: Unknown

Member of the Ohio House of Representatives from Champaign County
- In office 1812–1814
- Preceded by: Samuel McCulloch
- Succeeded by: Alexander McBeth; Samuel Newell

Member of the Ohio Senate
- In office 1840-1841

Personal details
- Born: March 21, 1786 Catfish Camp, Pennsylvania
- Died: August 24, 1852 (aged 66) Urbana, Ohio
- Resting place: Oak Dale Cemetery
- Party: Whig

Joseph Vance (March 21, 1786 – August 24, 1852) was a Whig politician from the U.S. state of Ohio. He served as the 13th governor of Ohio and was the first Whig to hold this position.

== Biography ==
Vance was born in Catfish (now Washington), Pennsylvania. He moved to Vanceburg, Kentucky, with his father Joseph C. Vance, a Revolutionary War veteran, in 1788, and later moved to Urbana, Ohio, in 1805. Vance married Mary Lemon in 1807.

== Career ==
A salt farmer, Vance gained a commission during the War of 1812 and rose quickly from Major to Major General. He served in the Ohio House of Representatives in 1812–1813, 1815–1816 and 1818–1819. Elected to the United States House of Representatives in 1820, Vance served seven terms before losing a bid for an eighth term in 1834. Vance ran for governor in 1836 and served a single two-year term, losing a bid for re-election in 1838.

He intended to retire but was elected to the Ohio State Senate, and served in the Senate from 1840 to 1841. Vance ran again for the House of Representatives in 1842 and served two more terms in the House. He did not run for re-election in 1846. Vance was a delegate to the 1848 Whig National Convention and was a member of the Ohio State Constitutional Convention in 1851.

== Death ==
Vance died on August 24, 1852, and was buried at Oak Dale Cemetery.

== Legacy ==
Vance was instrumental in laying out the town of Findlay, Ohio.

Political offices
Preceded by Robert Lucas	Governor of Ohio; 1836–1838	Succeeded by Wilson Shannon
Ohio House of Representatives
Preceded by Samuel McCulloch	Representative from Champaign County; 1812–1814; Served alongside: Hiram M. Curry (1813–1814), Samuel Newell (1812–1813)	Succeeded by Alexander McBeth; Samuel Newell
Preceded by Alexander McBeth; Samuel Newell	Representative from Champaign County; 1815–1816; Served alongside: Samuel McCulloch	Unknown
Preceded by Aaron L. Hunt; Reuben Wallace as Representatives from Champaign County	Representative from Champaign, Logan, and Clark Counties; 1819–1820; Served alongside: Reuben Wallace	District eliminated
U.S. House of Representatives
Preceded by Philemon Beecher	Member of the U.S. House of Representatives from Ohio's 5th congressional district 1821–1823	Succeeded by John Wilson Campbell
Preceded by David Chambers	Member of the U.S. House of Representatives from Ohio's 4th congressional district 1823–1833	Succeeded by Thomas Corwin
Preceded by Jeremiah Morrow	Member of the U.S. House of Representatives from Ohio's 4th congressional district 1843–1847	Succeeded by Richard S. Canby
Party political offices
Preceded by James Findlay	Whig Party nominee for Governor of Ohio; 1836, 1838	Succeeded by Thomas Corwin
