= Green Lawn Cemetery (Columbus, Ohio) =

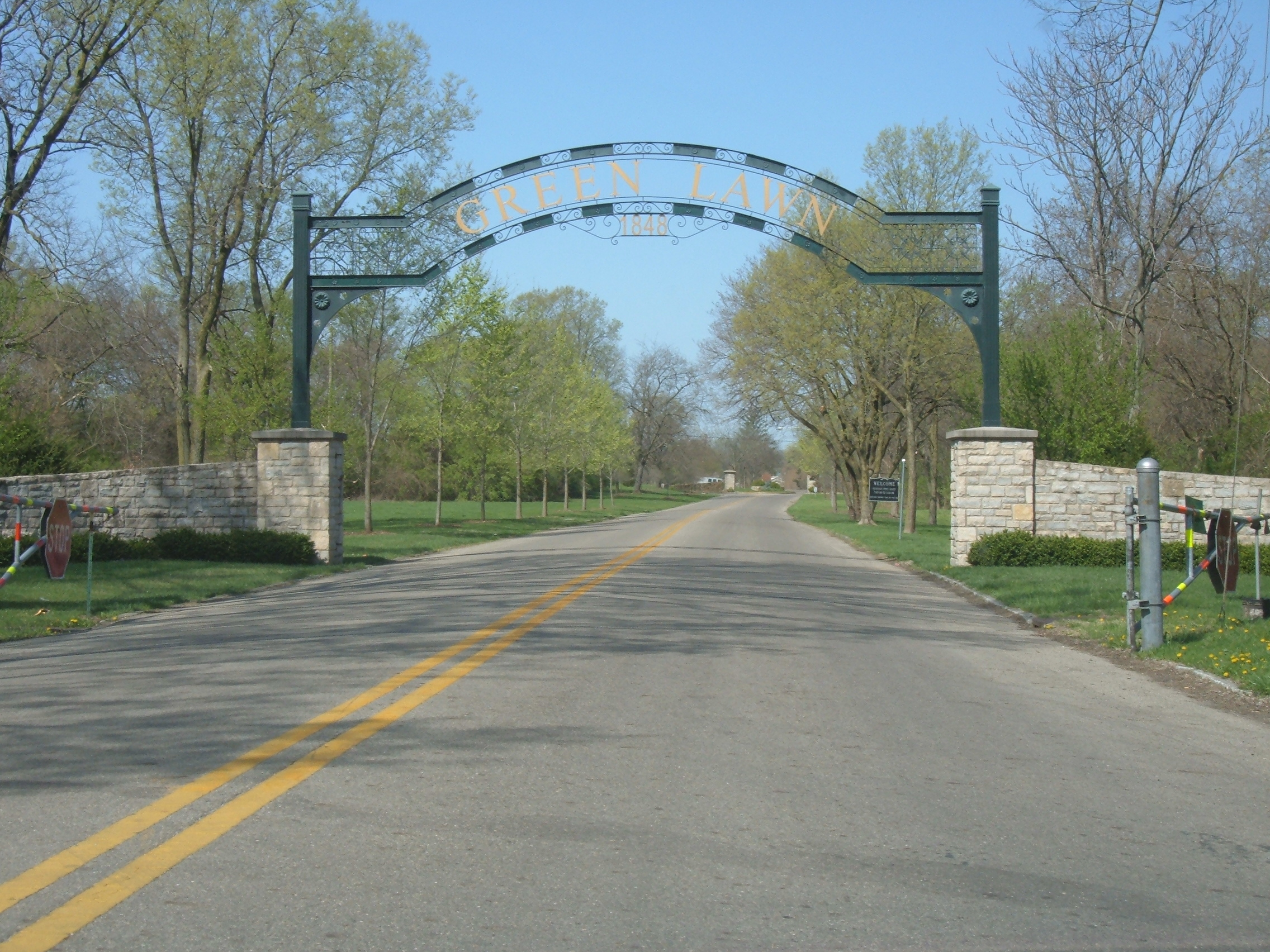
- Main (east) entrance of Green Lawn Cemetery
- Interactive map of Green Lawn Cemetery

Details
- Established: July 9, 1849
- Location: 1000 Greenlawn Avenue, Columbus, Ohio
- Country: United States
- Coordinates: 39.940389°N 83.032324°W
- Type: Private nonprofit
- Owned by: Green Lawn Cemetery Association
- Size: 360 acres (150 ha)
- No. of graves: 155,000 (as of 2017)
- Website: Green Lawn Cemetery
- The Political Graveyard: Green Lawn Cemetery

Green Lawn Cemetery is an active historic private rural cemetery located in Columbus, Ohio, in the United States. Organized in 1848 and opened in 1849, the cemetery was the city's premier burying ground in the 1800s and beyond. An American Civil War memorial was erected there in 1891, and chapel constructed in 1902. With 360 acres (150 ha), it is Ohio's second-largest cemetery.

== History ==
Franklinton Cemetery was the first cemetery established in what later became Columbus. It was built on land donated by Lucas Sullivant on River Street near Souder Avenue in 1799. Many of the early settlers of Franklinton and Columbus were buried there. The 11.5-acre (4.7 ha) North Graveyard followed in 1812, and the 11.25-acre (4.55 ha) East Graveyard in 1841. A 3-acre (1.2 ha) Roman Catholic cemetery opened in 1848 (although it had been in use as early as 1846). (Note: This cemetery had no name, but was generally referred to as the "Catholic Burying-Ground" and later the "Old Catholic Burying-Ground".)

=== Establishment of Green Lawn ===
By the mid-1840s, growing settlement in the area left the Franklinton, North, and East cemeteries too small to accommodate more burials. On February 24, 1848, the Ohio General Assembly enacted a law providing for the incorporation of cemetery associations by 10 or more people. On August 2, 1848, a group of Columbus area business and civic leaders that included A.C Brown, William G. Deshler, William A. Platt, Thomas Sparrow, Alfred P. Stone, Joseph Sullivant, William B. Thrall, and others formed the Green Lawn Cemetery Association. The group secured a charter from the Ohio General Assembly on March 23, 1849, incorporating the "Green Lawn Cemetery of Columbus". A public meeting was held on July 12, and a committee of 11 local leaders appointed to select a site and draft articles of incorporation. (Note: The committee consisted of William B. Hubbard, William Kelsey, Robert McCoy, John Miller, A.F. Perry, William A. Platt, Joseph Ridgway Jr., Joseph Sullivant, William B. Thrall, and John Walton.) The committee presented the public with draft articles of incorporation on August 2. These were accepted, and the first board of directors organized on August 26.

The board sought a site of about 50 to 100 acres (20 to 40 ha) of gently rolling land well-covered in trees and shrubs. The first purchase of 83 acres (34 ha) of forested land was made in the early spring of 1849 at a cost of $3,750 ($100,000 in 2025 dollars). This consisted of a 39-acre (16 ha) tract obtained from Judge Gershom M. Peters (Note: The purchase was announced on January 25, 1849.) and a 44-acre (18 ha) tract from William Miner. (Note: Purchase of additional land was not originally contemplated, but moved and authorized at a board of directors on April 16, 1849.) A public picnic was held on the ground on May 23, during which a partial clearing of a small portion of the land occurred. Architect Howard Daniels was hired to lay out the roads, paths, and plots. Daniels had spent several months in Europe studying rural cemetery design there, and had recently designed his first cemetery, Cincinnati's widely praised Spring Grove Cemetery. A formal dedication of the cemetery occurred on July 9. A superintendent's cottage was erected near the main gate on Brown Road, and Richard Woolley appointed the first superintendent. Daniels, who died in December 1863, is buried in the cemetery.

=== Growth of the cemetery ===
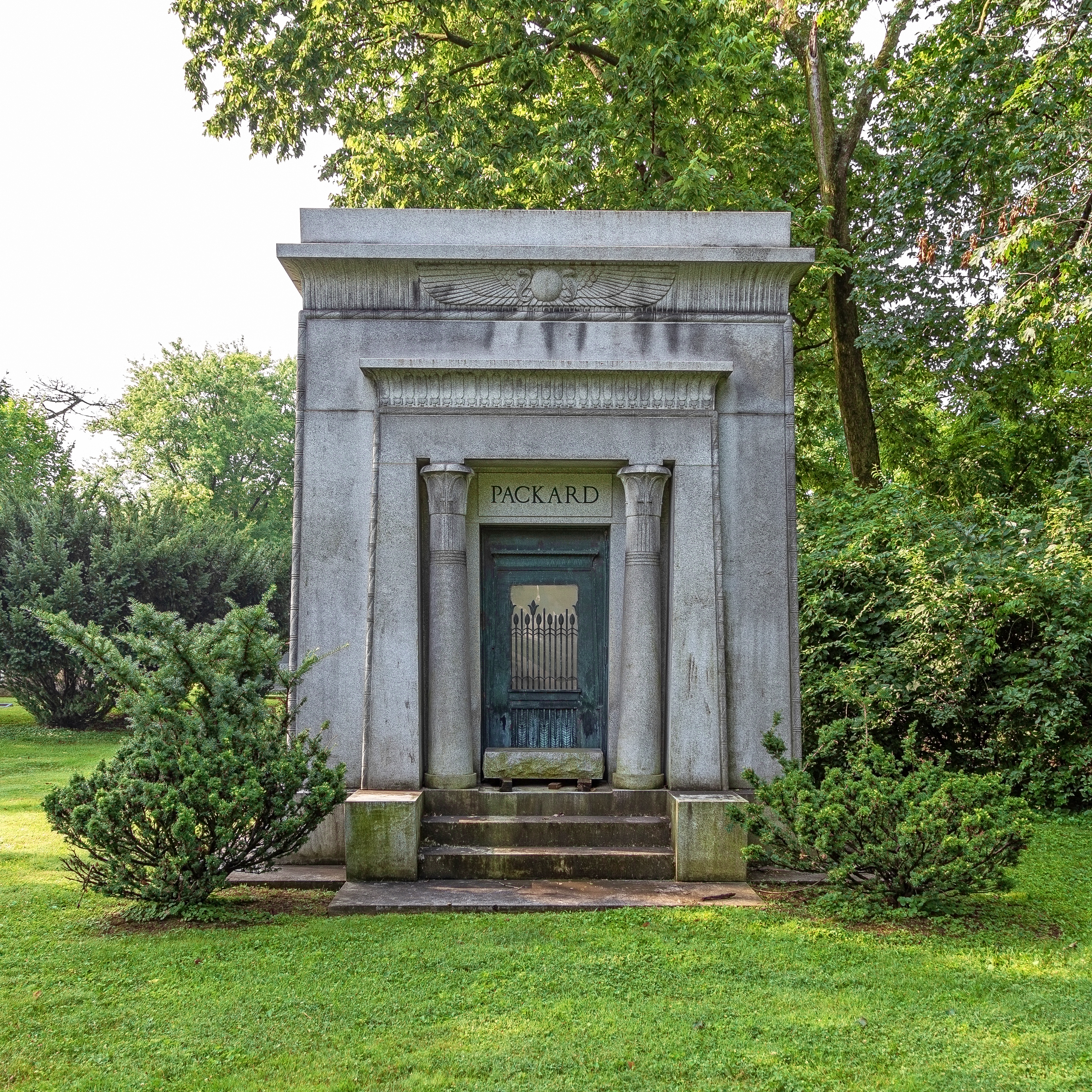
Packard family mausoleum

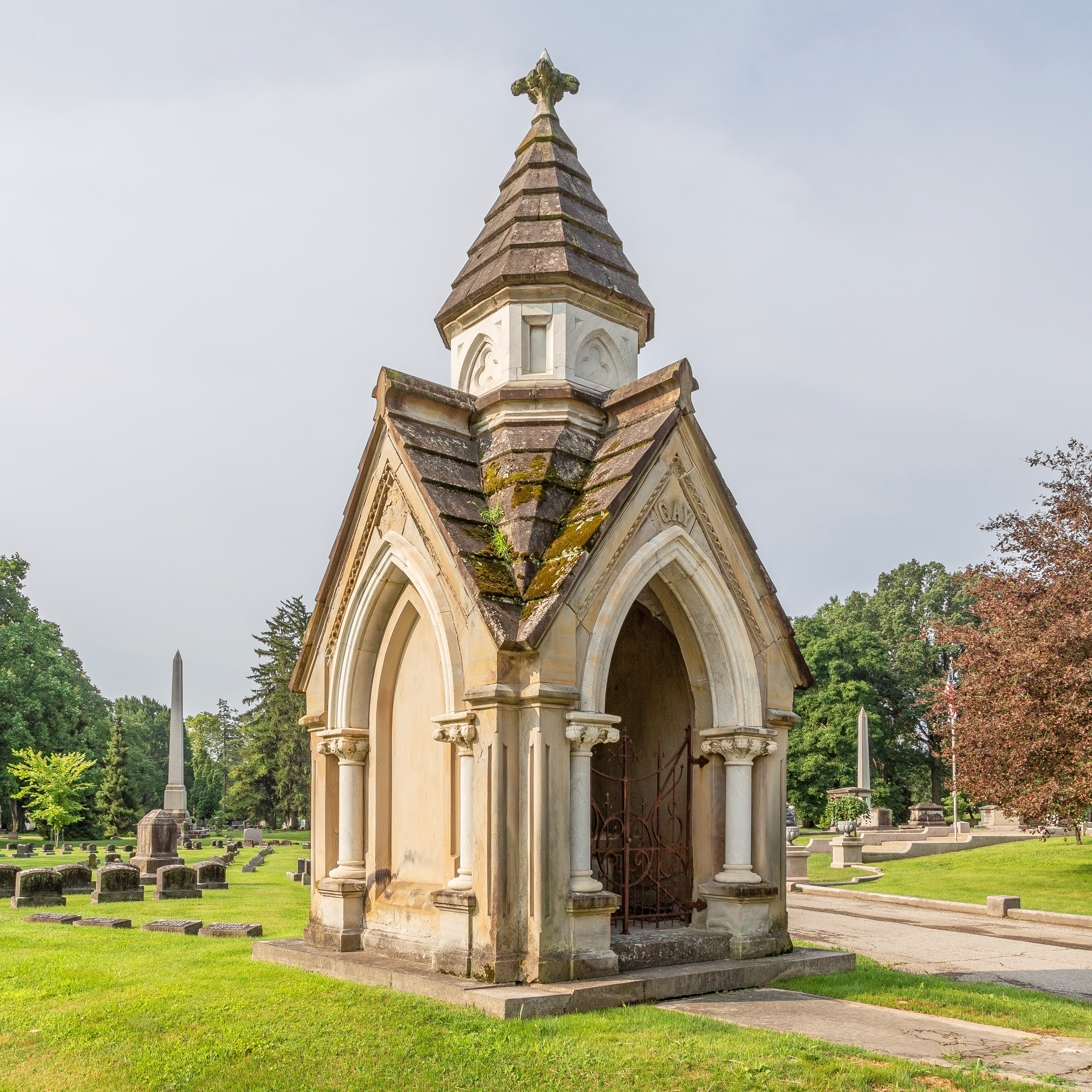
Gay family mausoleum

At the time, the cemetery was located 2.5 miles (4.0 km) west of the nascent village of Columbus. The first burial at Green Lawn Cemetery was that of a child, Leonora Perry, on July 7, 1849. The second, and first adult, was Dr. B. F. Gard on July 12. The first headstone or other monument in the cemetery was erected the second week of October 1849 by William G. Deshler. It was for his wife, Olive, who had died at the age of 19. The monument consisted of an upright stone slab depicting a rose branch. The bloom itself was carved on the plinth on which the slab stood, and was inscribed "Olive, wife of William G. Deshler, age 19". After Green Lawn opened, most of the families with graves at Franklinton Cemetery moved their ancestral remains to Green Lawn. (Note: Not all family plots were moved, and many individual graves also remained at Franklinton Cemetery.) Franklinton Cemetery quickly fell out of favor as a place to be buried. Those buried at North Graveyard also disinterred loved ones' remains and moved them to Green Lawn. By 1869, about half of those buried at North Graveyard had been reinterred at Green Lawn.

Green Lawn Cemetery lotholders voted to bar non-whites from being buried at Green Lawn in 1856. (Note: The North Graveyard was only partially racially integrated when it opened. Although African Americans could be buried there, they were buried in a separate section. When the East Graveyard opened in 1841, the city required that it be racially integrated. This land was marshy, and was used as a potter's field.) It was not until 1872 that this restriction was lifted, and a segregated section set aside for African Americans.

In February 1864, the trustees of Green Lawn Cemetery offered to exchange burial lots with those individuals who still retained plots at North Graveyard. Green Lawn intended to build homes on the site of the abandoned North Graveyard and lease them in order to generate income. In addition, the Columbus, Chicago and Indiana Central Railway sought to condemn a portion of the burying ground for a railroad right of way. The two offers generated extensive litigation, as lotholders sought to prevent the disinterment of loved ones and those who had deeded land to the city tried to regain title to it. This litigation was not resolved until the late 1870s, and it was not until 1881 that most graves were removed from North Graveyard. (Note: Not all bodies were removed. Several hundred bodies were never removed, and lay just 2 to 3 feet (0.61 to 0.91 m) below the surface.)

On April 1, 1872, the cemetery purchased a 32-acre (13 ha) tract from Samuel Stimmel and a 30-acre (12 ha) tract from John Stimmel, bringing the cemetery's total size to 147 acres (59 ha). In 1887, Green Lawn expanded to 275 acres (111 ha), and Green Lawn Avenue opened to create an eastern entrance to the cemetery. In 1898, an iron bridge was built over a ravine between sections 54 and 55. By 1919, all the roads in the cemetery were of macadam, and had gutters.

The Soldiers and Sailors' Memorial was erected at Green Lawn Cemetery in 1891. Cemetery officials first set aside a section (M) for military burials on June 10, 1862. The Ex-Soldiers and Sailors' Association of Franklin County, a group of Civil War veterans, purchased four lots in section 28 in November 1881 for the interment of veterans. Two years later, the association began a campaign to raise funds for the design and erection of a veterans memorial in that section. Another four lots in section 28 were purchased in January 1886, and in March 1886 the Ohio General Assembly authorized the commissioners of Franklin County to levy a tax to aid in the construction of the memorial. A memorial design was approved in October 1886, and the memorial erected by the New England Granite Works of Hartford, Connecticut. The $8,900 ($300,000 in 2025 dollars) memorial was completed in November 1890.

=== 21st century vandalism ===
In 2012, metal thieves damaged numerous family mausoleums, in some cases stealing entire door and window grates and in one case breaking into crypts in a family mausoleum. The perpetrators were never caught, and the cemetery extended fences to prevent after-hours vehicular entry and contract random security patrols. These measures proved insufficient when the next acts of vandalism occurred.

A vandal struck Green Lawn Cemetery more than a dozen times beginning in the fall of 2014. The vandal initially knocked over gravestones, but over time the damage worsened. By early 2016, more than 600 monuments were damaged as well as glass and the historic bust of Gustavus Swan. Cemetery officials estimated the cost of repairs at more than $1.25 million ($1,600,000 in 2025 dollars). Cemetery officials contracted full nighttime security patrols in the cemetery and installed numerous security cameras which resulted in identifying the vandal, but he was never charged by law enforcement. By 2021 most of the damage was repaired except for a few broken obelisks.

The enhanced security measures have, as of 2026, curtailed any similar vandalism after-hours.

In the wake of the vandalism, cemetery volunteers and instructors at Columbus State Community College created a geographic information system capstone course. Taught by Doreen Whitley Rogers, nonprofit executive and wife of a cemetery trustee, students in the course donated more than $10,000 ($13,135 in 2025 dollars) in free consulting services to the cemetery. Damaged graves were identified and damage documented, potential vandal points of entry noted, repair cost analyses generated, and patterns of criminal activity in the cemetery identified.

Starting in 2020, a vandal damaged nearly 100 trees over a period of several months during mornings shortly after the grounds opened. A suspect was identified by law enforcement and barred from the property.

== Huntington Chapel ==
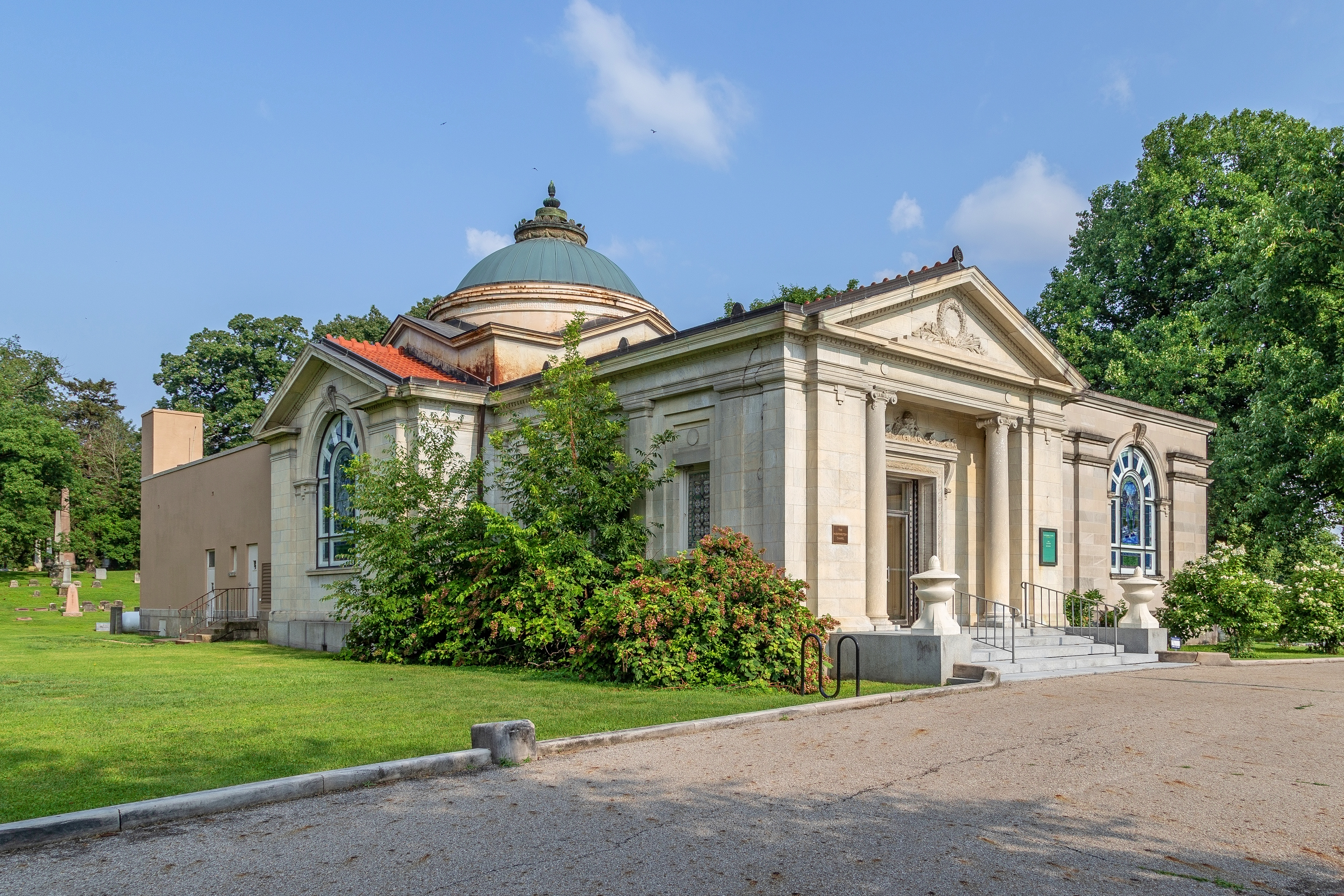
Huntington Chapel

Green Lawn officials had long desired to build a chapel at the cemetery ever since its formation in 1848. A site was selected, but cemetery expansion made it less than ideal. A second site was selected, but again expansion rendered the site inappropriate. After the 1887 expansion, the board of directors felt secure enough to select a permanent location for the new chapel. Design and construction were put off until enough funds had been raised to erect a substantial building of excellent materials and workmanship. The fundraising effort neared completion in 1899, at which time the board selected architect Frank L. Packard to design the chapel. Packard was a natural choice, as he had advised the board for several years on the landscape design and aesthetics of the cemetery.

This structure, originally called the Mortuary Chapel, was dedicated on November 11, 1902. The chapel is in the Renaissance Revival style, and features a rotunda capped in red vitrified tile. The dome bears a resemblance to the Ohio Statehouse (then still under construction). The structure rests on a bed of gravel 8 feet (2.4 m) below the surface. The foundations are of concrete and stone, and arches of brick and concrete support the building above. The exterior walls are of white marble, while the interior walls are clad in "English vein" Italian marble. (Note: White Italian marble comes in three classes: Sicilian (also known as Bianco Chiaro), with cloudy and irregular veins; Statuary, which has no clouds or veins; and Vein. In the United States, Sicilian and Vein are lumped together into a single category, known as English vein. English vein is classified as grade one (no clouds, well-defined light or heavy veins), grade two (light clouds, with well-defined light or heavy veins), and grade three (clouds and veins, light or heavy, well- or ill-defined).) The main entry doors were wood with an iron set of gates and flanked by Ionic columns, while the interior floor is a geometric pattern of black and white tile. The dome, made of leaded art glass, supported by interior pilasters of bronze and marble.

The chapel contains two murals (depicting Truth and Wisdom), a number of mosaics, and windows of both leaded and stained glass. The art glass murals were designed by Frederick Wilson and executed by Tiffany & Co. The stained glass windows were designed by Tiffany & Co. The north window depicts Peggy Thompson, the first white woman known to die in the area, and the south window Isaac Dalton, a superintendent of the Soldier's Home in Columbus who took special care of wounded soldiers during the American Civil War. Peletiah Huntington, founder of what became Huntington Bancshares, donated the mosaics, murals, and stained glass windows. The rest of the chapel cost $24,000 ($900,000 in 2025 dollars). The funeral space in the chapel was dedicated to Huntington in 1902 with the placement of a bronze tablet there.

The Mortuary Chapel was designed to be a place where funerals could be held. Over time, few funerals were held there. Instead, the public began using the chapel as a meditative space, and requesting to be buried inside it. The chapel was renovated, a west wing with service room and bathrooms added in 1963. The addition and the north wing added in 1979 were in the Neoclassical style. The Thompson stained glass window was relocated to the east wall of the new wing, while a new stained glass window and fountain were placed at the west wall of the wing. The north wing serves as an indoor mausoleum. In 1981 an electronic carillon system was donated to replace the original pump organ that had been removed in 1969. In 1994 the dome was covered in copper panels and other modifications were made to attempt to stop water damage inside. These modifications were neither desirable nor effective, and between 2025 and 2026 a full restoration of the glass dome and additional restoration of the roof was completed. Other changes from the 1963 and 1979 modifications were reversed or eliminated.

The chapel was rededicated in the early 2000s as Huntington Chapel.

== About Green Lawn Cemetery ==
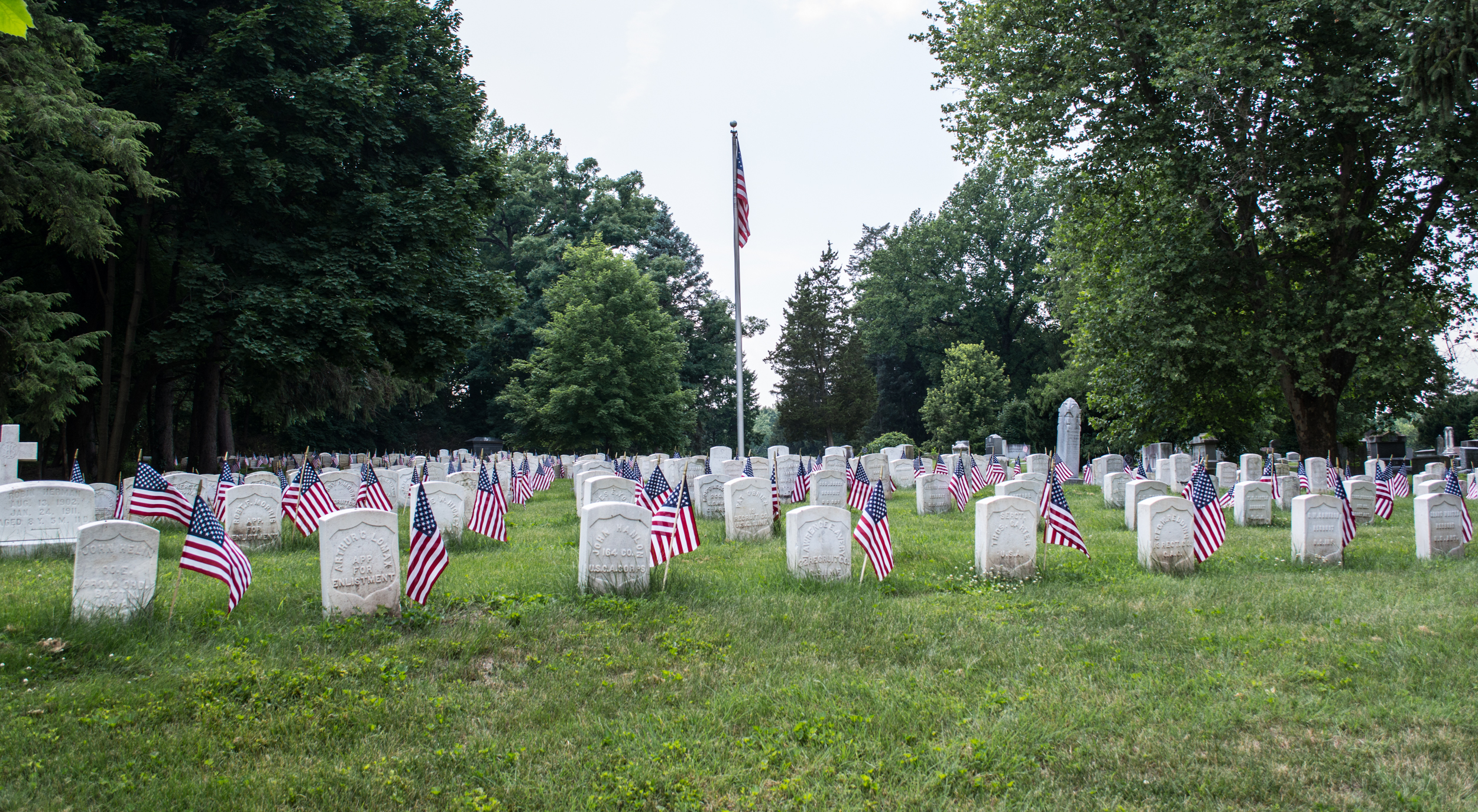
Section 51, one of six sections at Green Lawn Cemetery set aside for war dead and veterans

Green Lawn Cemetery is privately owned by the nonprofit Green Lawn Cemetery Association. The cemetery is one of Ohio's most prominent rural (or "garden") cemeteries. Any member of the public may purchase a plot.

As of 2021, Green Lawn Cemetery contained 360 acres (1.5 km^{2}), making it Ohio's second-largest cemetery. About 80 acres (32 ha) were undeveloped, which cemetery officials said should provide burial space for another 100 to 150 years. About 27 miles (43 km) of roads wind through the burying ground.

There are roughly 7,200 trees belonging to 150 species at the cemetery which is also recognized as an arboretum. This includes four "state champion" trees (the largest and tallest trees of their species anywhere in the state). The oldest tree (as of 2026) is a white oak believed to be over 315 years old. In 1999, the Audubon Society recognized Green Lawn Cemetery as part of the Lower Scioto River Ohio "Important Bird Area". 224 species of birds have been recorded at the cemetery.

According to cemetery records in 2025, more than 160,000 people were buried at Green Lawn Cemetery. This included 6,600 veterans buried in seven military sections (thousands more are buried on private lots), of which 15 were generals and five Medal of Honor recipients. Portions of two of the military sections are National Cemeteries.

Sections at Green Lawn Cemetery were originally lettered in the order in which they were developed. The cemetery's rapid expansion forced the cemetery to begin numbering sections after running through the alphabet.

=== Notable structures and art ===
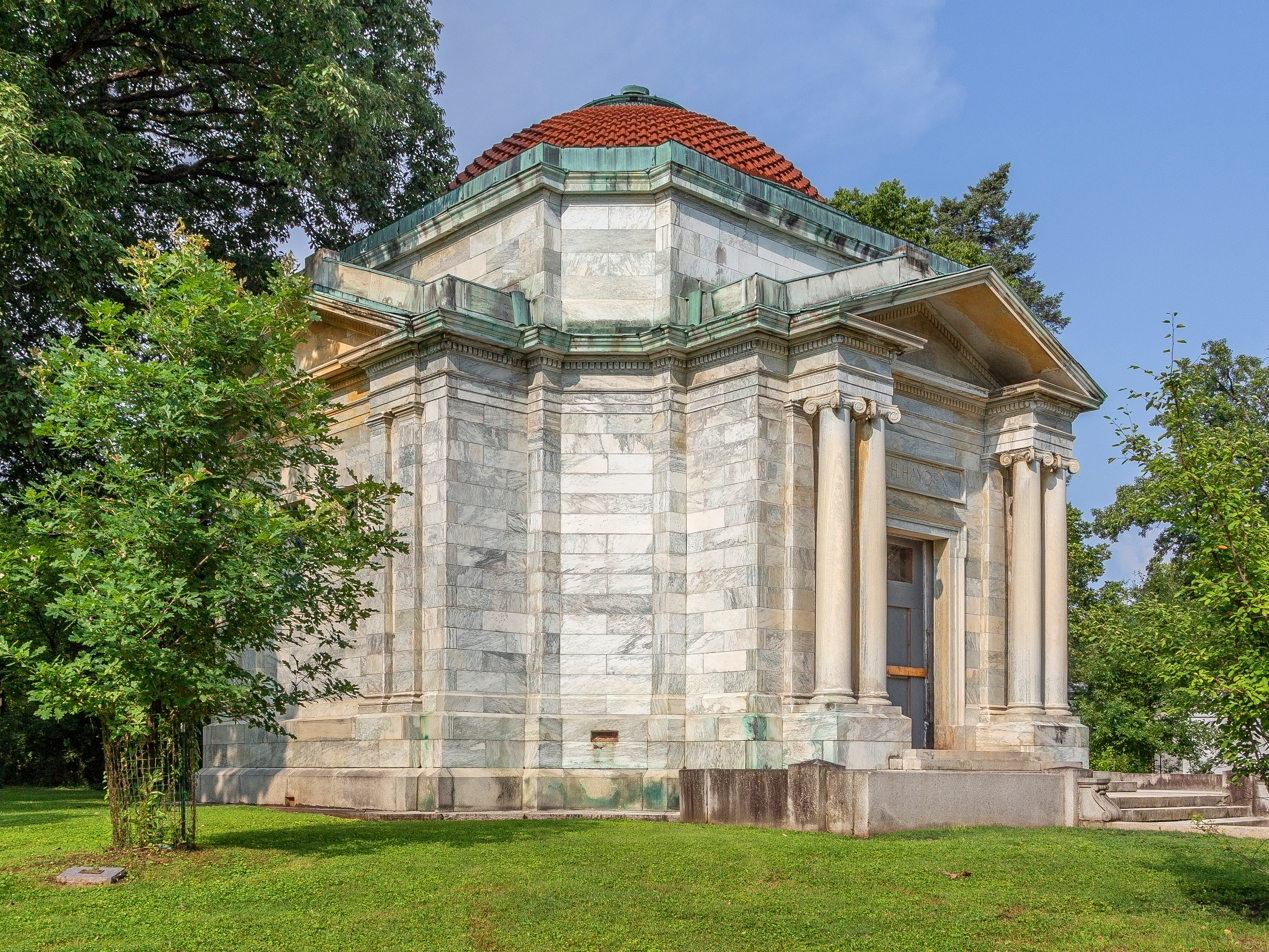
The Hayden Mausoleum

The Hayden family mausoleum is the cemetery's largest. Designed by local architect Frank L. Packard, it was completed for banker Charles H. Hayden in early 1905. Built at a cost of about $80,000 to $100,000 ($2,900,000 to $3,600,000 in 2025 dollars), the Neoclassical style tomb had a granite foundation, interior and exterior walls of white Vermont marble, and two Ionic columns on each side of the main entrance. The structure is 45 feet (14 m) wide, 55 feet (17 m) deep, and has a 45-foot (14 m) high dome. The interior is octagonal, and features two columns of marble with a hue like alabaster in each corner. The tomb contains twelve marble sarcophagi, carved in Italy. The main doors are of wood with an iron gate. Hayden wanted the construction of the mausoleum to be a surprise for his family, so Packard refused to tell the press or cemetery officials who commissioned the work until it was completed. The interior was decorated by Tiffany & Co to include a central marble font, stained glass dome and windows, a patterned tessellated tile floor, and four large lunette murals by Thomas Conrad depicting scenes from the life of Jesus. The building was listed on the Ohio and Columbus list of endangered buildings in 2019 and as of 2026 requires at least $10,000,000 in restoration.

A row of small, family mausoleums in section 65 contains the Egyptian revival Frank L. Packard mausoleum. Long said to be designed by Packard, in truth he merely selected elements from a catalog. One of the more striking small mausoleums can be found in Section 32, the gothic Gay family mausoleum.

Other significant art includes the Riodan bronze bas relief by artist Fidardo Landi, the bust of Gustavus Swan by Robert Laurent (since replaced), the Elk's Rest monument (originally by John Segeman), a series of three anthropomorphic deer by artist Renata Feckler who also contributed the bronze statue of "Muggs, The Dog Who Bit People", "Departed Denizens", a tribute by Mike Majors to un-named removals from the North Grave Yard, the statue on the grave of Elizabeth Reese, "The Fisherman" over the grave of Emil Ambose, and the bronze sarcophagus over the grave of F.W. Schumacher.

A history of Green Lawn Cemetery is expected in 2027 from Ohio University Press.

== Notable burials ==
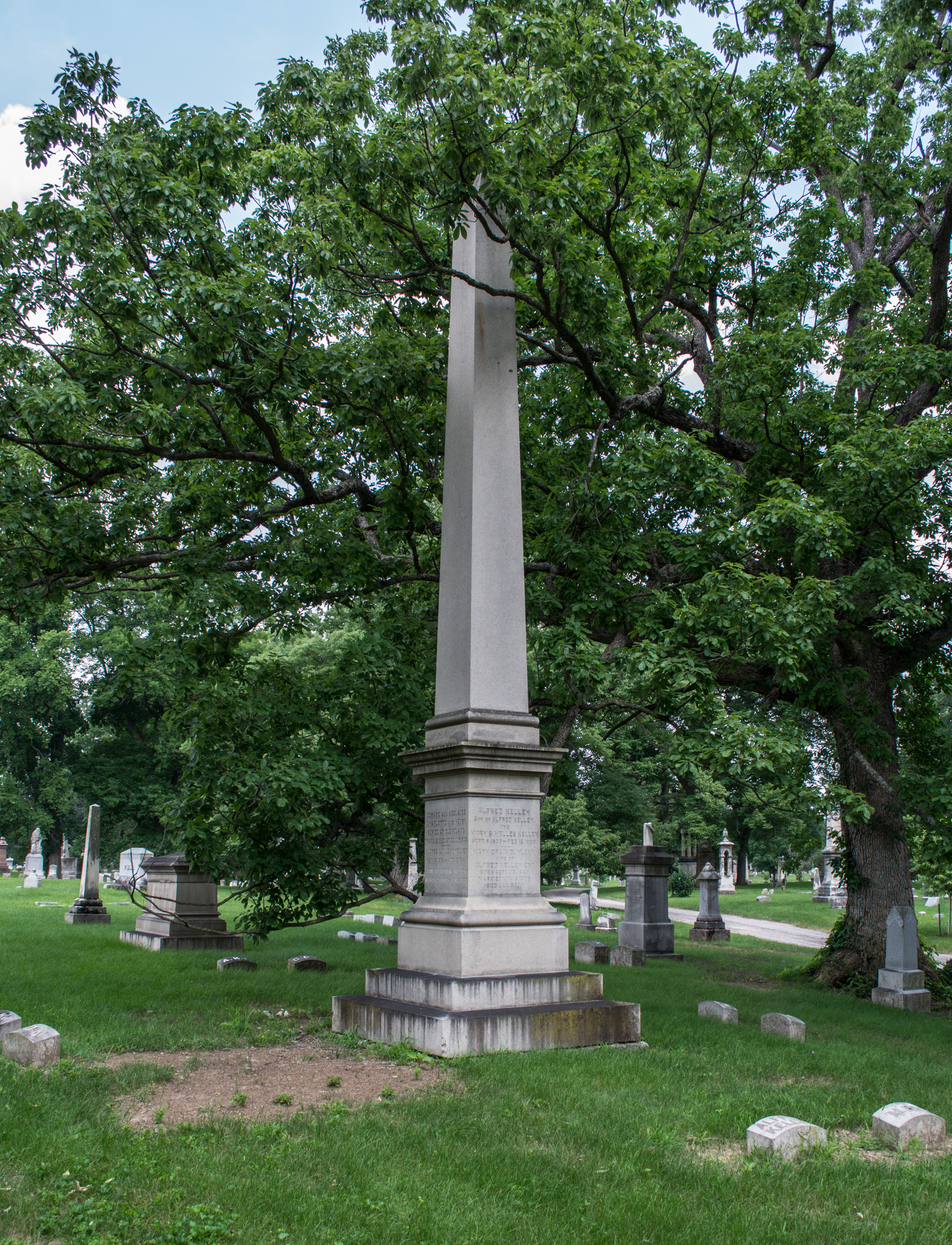
Grave of Alfred Kelley and his immediate descendants

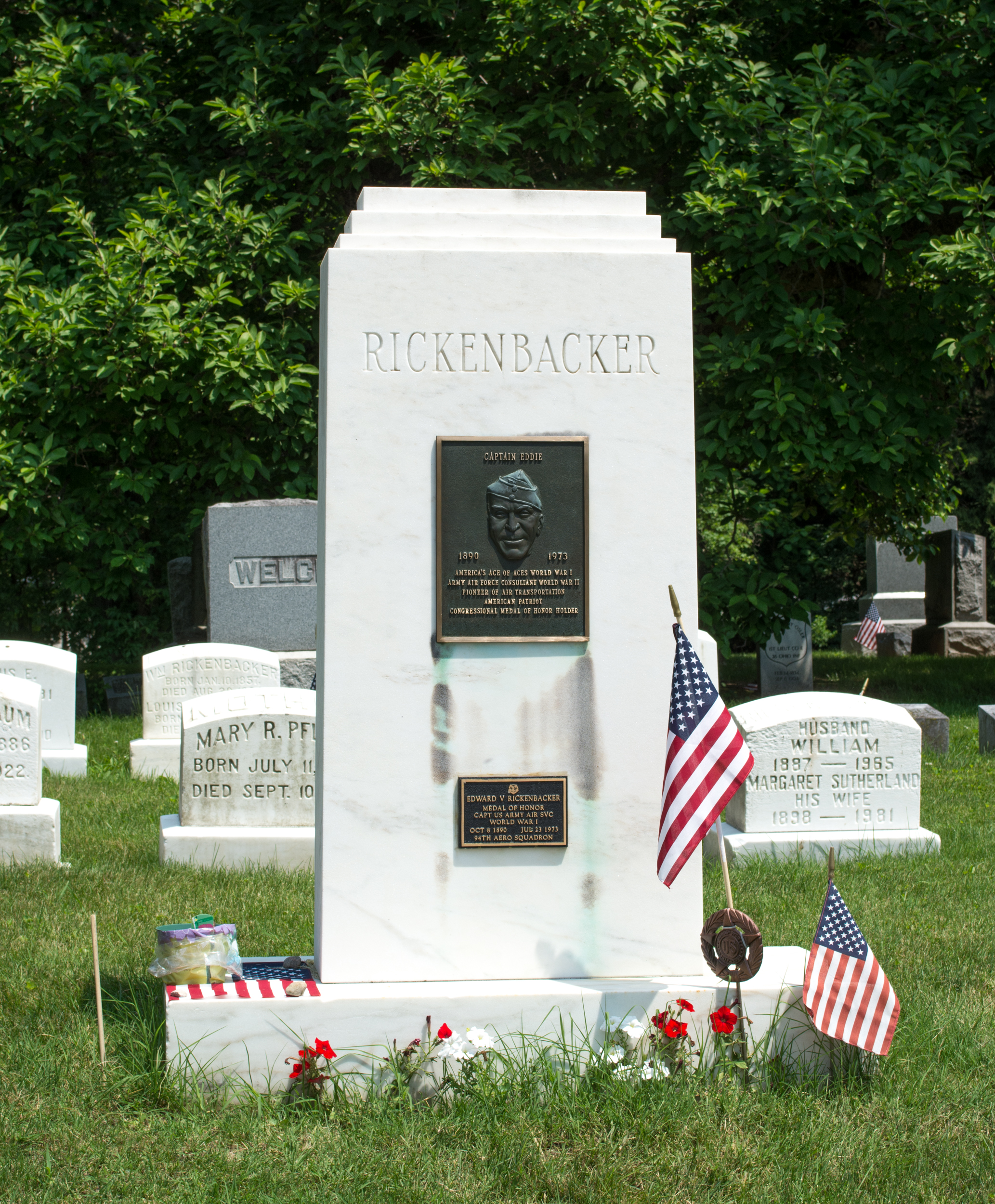
Grave of World War I flying ace Eddie Rickenbacker

Notable individuals buried at the cemetery include:

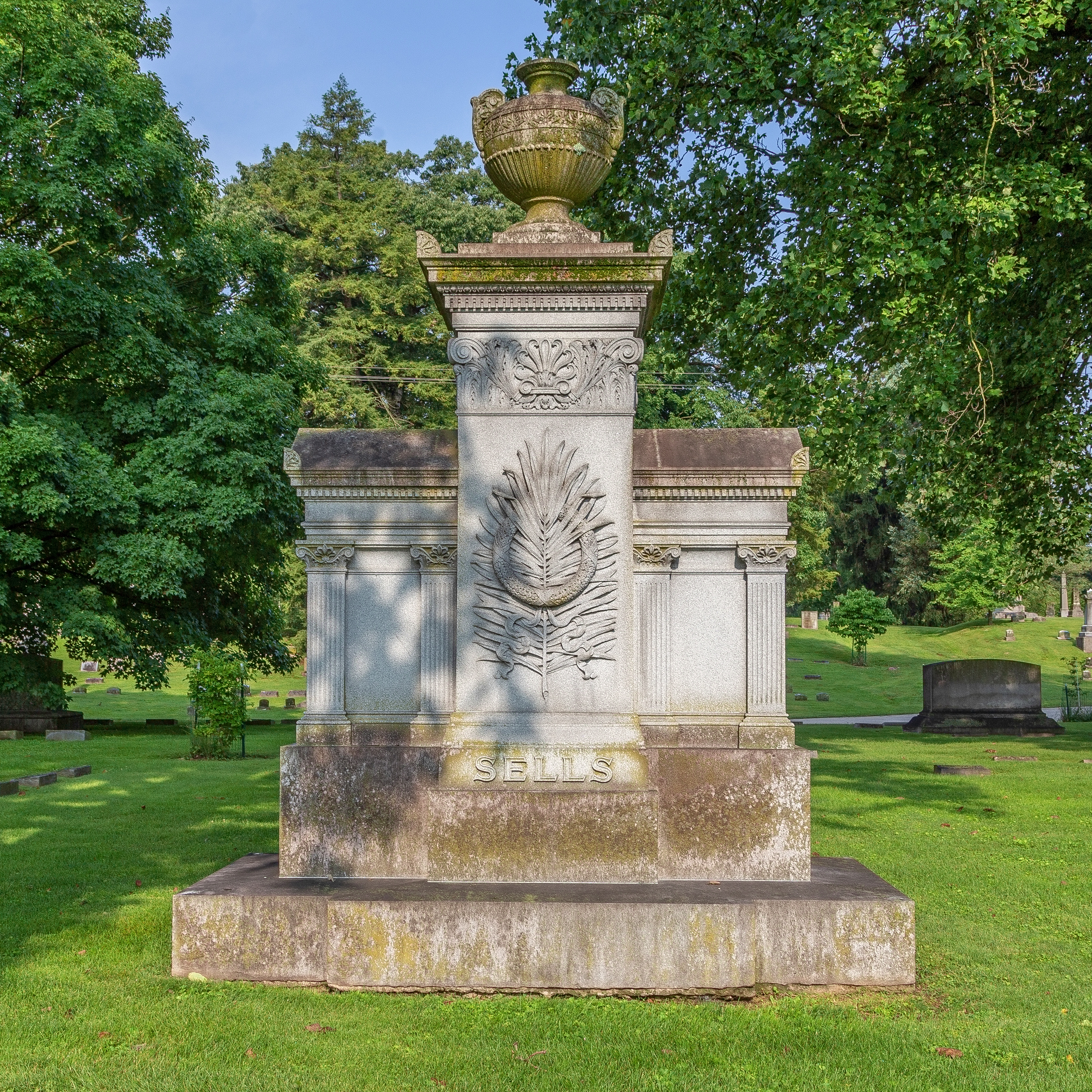
Monument to the Sells family

- De Witt C. Badger, member of the U.S. House of Representatives and Mayor of Columbus
- Gordon Battelle, founder of Battelle Memorial Institute
- Otto Beatty Jr., attorney, politician, Civil Rights leader
- Edward Franklin Bingham (1828–1907), Ohio state representative and chief justice of the Supreme Court of the District of Columbia
- Thomas Blakiston, English explorer and naturalist
- John W. Bricker, Ohio Governor, U.S. Senator, and U.S. vice presidential candidate
- Samuel Bush, industrialist, grandfather of President George H. W. Bush, and great-grandfather of President George W. Bush
- James E. Campbell, Governor of Ohio and member of the U.S. House of Representatives
- William Turner Coggeshall, newspaper editor, spy for the Union Army, U.S. Ambassador to Ecuador
- James M. Comly, Civil War general in the Union Army, newspaper editor, and political backer
- James L. Conger, member of the U.S. House of Representatives
- George L. Converse, member of the U.S. House of Representatives
- Howard Daniels, landscape architect and rural cemetery designer
- Augustus Stoner Decker, Mayor of Columbus
- William Dennison Jr., Governor of Ohio
- Cromwell Dixon, aviation pioneer, first person to fly over the Continental Divide
- Daniel S. Earhart, member of the U.S. House of Representatives
- Merie Earle, actress
- Al G. Field, minstrel show operator
- James W. Forsyth, U.S. Army general, war criminal
- Samuel Galloway, member of the U.S. House of Representatives
- Wally Gerber, baseball player
- Washington Gladden, minister and social reformer
- Lincoln Goodale, first physician to practice in Columbus
- Stomp Gordon, jump blues pianist and singer
- Clinton Greaves, Buffalo Soldier and Medal of Honor recipient
- Phale Hale, civil rights leader and Ohio state legislator
- Henry Howe, historian
- Alfred Kelley, banker, canal builder, and railroad executive
- Nathan Kelley, architect, designer of the Ohio Statehouse
- Simon Lazarus, founder of Lazarus department stores
- John J. Lentz, member of the U.S. House of Representatives
- George H. Maetzel, Ohio architect
- William T. Martin, Mayor of Columbus
- Edward S. Matthias, longest-serving associate justice on the Supreme Court of Ohio
- Abram Irvin McDowell, Mayor of Columbus
- William L. McMillen, physician, Civil War general in the Union Army, and carpetbagger legislator
- Samuel Medary, newspaper owner and territorial governor of Minnesota and Kansas
- Grant Mitchell, actor
- John G. Mitchell, Civil War general in the Union Army
- Heman A. Moore, member of the U.S. House of Representatives
- George K. Nash, Governor of Ohio
- Edward Orton Sr., Ohio State Geologist and first president of Ohio State University
- Edward Orton Jr., Ohio State Geologist and ceramic engineer
- Joseph H. Outhwaite, member of the U.S. House of Representatives
- Frank Packard, architect
- Alice E. Heckler Peters (1845–1921), social reformer
- Frederick Phisterer, Civil War captain and recipient of the Medal of Honor
- James Preston Poindexter, abolitionist, Civil Rights activist
- Joseph H. Potter, American Civil War general in the Union Army
- James A. Rhodes, Governor of Ohio and Mayor of Columbus
- Eddie Rickenbacker, WWI flying ace, Medal of Honor recipient and industrialist
- Joseph Ridgway, member of the U.S. House of Representatives
- James Linn Rodgers, American diplomat
- Alice Schille, watercolor artist
- Orland Smith, Civil War general in the Union Army
- James H. Snook, Olympic gold medalist, Ohio State University professor and convicted murderer
- Billy Southworth, baseball player and manager, inducted to the National Baseball Hall of Fame in 2008
- Billy Southworth Jr., baseball player and bomber pilot, son of Billy Southworth
- Alfred P. Stone, member of the U.S. House of Representatives
- Lucas Sullivant, land surveyor, founder of Franklinton, Ohio
- Joseph Rockwell Swan, associate justice of the Supreme Court of Ohio
- Edward L. Taylor Jr., member of the U.S. House of Representatives
- William Oxley Thompson, fifth President of Ohio State University
- James Thurber, humorist, author, and New Yorker columnist
- Allen G. Thurman, member of the U.S. Senate and U.S. House of Representatives, associate justice of the Supreme Court of Ohio, and U.S. vice presidential candidate
- Dan Tipton, sailor, gambler, and posse rider with Wyatt Earp's vendetta ride
- Edward C. Turner, Ohio Attorney General and associate justice of the Supreme Court of Ohio
- John Martin Vorys, member of the U.S. House of Representatives
- Charles C. Walcutt, Civil War general in the Union Army and Mayor of Columbus
- David K. Watson, member of the U.S. House of Representatives
- Wallace Ralston Westlake, Mayor of Columbus
- Wayne Bidwell Wheeler, Prohibitionist and leader of Anti-Saloon League
- James Andrew Williams, Major League Baseball manager
- William Tecumseh Wilson, Civil War general in the Union Army
- George Ziegler, Civil War general in the Union Army

== See also ==
- Green Lawn Abbey, nearby but unrelated

== Bibliography ==
- Acts of a General Nature Passed by the Forty-Sixth General Assembly of the State of Ohio, Begun and Held in the City of Columbus December 6, 1847 and in the Forty-Sixth Year of Said State. Volume XLVI. Columbus, Ohio: Chas. Scott's Steam Press. 1848. hdl:2027/uc1.b3831116.
- Acts of a Local Nature Passed by the Forty-Eighth General Assembly of the State of Ohio, Begun and Held in the City of Columbus December 3, 1849 and in the Forty-Eighth Year of Said State. Volume XLVIII. Columbus, Ohio: Scott& Bascom. 1850. hdl:2027/osu.32437011486079.
- Barrett, Richard E. (2012). Aviation in Columbus. Charleston, S.C.: Arcadia Publishing. ISBN 9780738593715.
- Bentley, Elizabeth Petty (1984). Ohio Cemetery Records. Baltimore, Md.: Genealogical Publishing Company. ISBN 9780806310718.
- Cothran, James R.; Danylchak, Erica (2018). Historic American Cemeteries and the Nineteenth Century Rural Cemetery Movement. Columbia, S.C.: University of South Carolina Press. ISBN 9781611177992.
- Darbee, Jeffrey T.; Recchie, Nancy A. (2008). The AIA Guide to Columbus. Ohio University Press. ISBN 9780821416846.
- Eagle, Bob; LeBlanc, Eric S. (2013). Blues: A Regional Experience. Santa Barbara, Calif.: Praeger. ISBN 9780313344237.
- Eicher, John H.; Eicher, David J. (2001). Civil War High Commands. Stanford, Calif.: Stanford University Press. ISBN 9780804736411.
- Hannan, Caryn; Herman, Jennifer L. (2008). Michigan Biographical Dictionary. Hamburg, Mich.: State History Publications. ISBN 9781878592958.
- Hooper, Osman Castle (1920). History of the City of Columbus, Ohio, From the Founding of Franklinton in 1797, Through the World War Period to the Year 1920. Columbus, Ohio: Memorial Publishing Co.
- Lee, Alfred Emory (1892). History of the City of Columbus, Capital of Ohio. Volume 2. Chicago: Munsell & Co.
- Lee, Bill (2009). The Baseball Necrology: The Post-Baseball Lives and Deaths of More 7,600 Major League Players and Others. Jefferson, N.C.: McFarland & Co. ISBN 9780786442393.
- Lehosit, Sean V. (2015). West Columbus. Charleston, S.C.: Arcadia Publishing. ISBN 9781467114639.
- Leland, Ernest S. (August 1919). "Green Lawn Cemetery, An Appreciation". Park and Cemetery. pp. 146–148.
- Martin, Martin T. (1993). History of Franklin County: A Collection of Reminiscences of the Early Settlement of the County. Columbus, Ohio: Bergman Books. ISBN 9780963603609.
- Miller, C.L. (2008). Mount Calvary Cemetery. Charleston, S.C.: Arcadia Publishing. ISBN 9780738552057.
- Renwick, William G. (1909). Marble and Marble Working. New York: D. Van Nostrand & Co.
- Samuelson, Robert E.; et al. (Pasquale C. Grado, Judith L. Kitchen, Jeffrey T. Darbee) (1976). Architecture: Columbus. The Foundation of The Columbus Chapter of The American Institute of Architects. OCLC 2697928.
- Strader, Levi T. (1899). Facts and Figures of Franklin County, Ohio. Columbus, Ohio: Strader.
- Studer, Jacob Henry (1873). Columbus, Ohio: Its History, Resources, and Progress, with Numerous Illustrations. Columbus, Ohio: Higginson Book Company. hdl:2027/hvd.32044013663596.
- Wilson, Scott; Mank, Gregory W. (2016). Resting Places: The Burial Sites of More Than 14,000 Famous Persons. Jefferson, N.C.: McFarland & Co. ISBN 9780786479924.
- Wooley, Charles F.; Van Brimmer, Barbara (2006). The Second Blessing: Columbus Medicine and Health: The Early Years. South Egremont, Mass.: Science International Corp. ISBN 9780978816902.
