= The Columbus Citizen-Journal =

Defunct newspaper in Columbus, Ohio

- Type: Daily newspaper
- Owner: Scripps-Howard
- Founded: 1959
- Ceased publication: December 31, 1985
- Language: English
- Headquarters: Columbus, Ohio

The Columbus Citizen-Journal was a daily morning newspaper in Columbus, Ohio published by the Scripps Howard company. It was formed in 1959 by the merger of The Columbus Citizen and The Ohio State Journal. It shared printing facilities, as well as business, advertising, and circulation staff in a joint operating agreement with The Columbus Dispatch. The last paper printed was on December 31, 1985.

== History ==
The origins of The Columbus Citizen-Journal date back to 1809 when the first printing press in central Ohio was introduced in the town of Worthington by two men from New England. This led to the establishment of the Worthington Intelligencer newspaper two years later. The paper's operations were moved to nearby Columbus in 1814 after that city became the state's new capital. The newspaper was renamed The Ohio State Journal, and it became the official mouthpiece of the then-new Republican Party in the late 1850s, guided by its editor and proprietor, James M. Comly. Following Comly's military service during the American Civil War, he returned to Columbus and rapidly established the Journal as one of the leading newspapers in Ohio. Through his editorials, Comly is considered by some to have been instrumental in helping Rutherford B. Hayes be elected Governor of Ohio and later President of the United States. Comly left the paper in 1872 when he was named to a diplomatic post in Hawaii, but his guidance had firmly established its importance in Ohio politics and news reporting. Shortly after the start of the 20th century, the paper was purchased by the Wolfe family. In 1950, they merged The Ohio State Journal with the Dispatch Printing Company.

The rival Columbus Citizen had been founded in 1899 as an independent newspaper not affiliated with a political party. In 1959, it was merged by its owner, the E. W. Scripps Company, with The Ohio State Journal to form The Columbus Citizen-Journal. The Citizen-Journal, which was published by Scripps in the morning Monday through Saturday, operated under a "joint operating agreement" with its rival, the afternoon Columbus Dispatch. The C-J was editorially separate, but shared the physical printing plant and the distribution and advertising staffs of the Dispatch.

After the Dispatch decided not to renew the joint operating agreement when it expired, Scripps sold the Citizen-Journal to a Bath Township (eastern Ohio) businessman, who stated he intended to publish it past January 1, 1986. However, on December 30, 1985, he gave the Journal back to Scripps, which closed the newspaper on December 31, 1985, when the joint operating agreement with Dispatch Printing Company expired. The Dispatch Printing Company moved the Dispatch from afternoon publication to morning publication on January 1, 1986.

== Controversy regarding end of circulation ==
The Dispatch Printing Co. and Scripps-Howard, as the Scripps company was known in the mid-1980s, blamed each other for the demise of the Citizen-Journal.

Under the 26-year joint operating agreement that the two companies had signed in 1959, both papers were printed on the Dispatch Printing Co. printing presses. The Dispatch Printing Co. collected advertising and circulation revenue, and paid most operating expenses for both papers, while Scripps owned The Citizen-Journal's circulation lists and independently operated that paper's editorial department. More than three years prior to the December 31, 1985 termination of the joint operating agreement, Dispatch executives informed Scripps that they did not wish to renew the contract.

Scripps-Howard, a publicly traded company, was at the time one of the largest media conglomerates in the country, and owned 14 newspapers, seven TV stations, nine cable-TV companies, seven radio stations and other media. Circulation at the Columbus Citizen-Journal had been on the rise in recent years, and Scripps reported that it was a profitable property for Scripps for most of the 26-year arrangement. Scripps, however, demonstrated a pattern of closing or selling off newspapers that were in difficult competitive positions, rather than invest in them; in the previous three years, Scripps had closed such daily newspapers in Memphis and Cleveland, and subsequently the company has done the same at several other newspapers, including the Pittsburgh Press in 1992 following the expiration of its own JOA with the Pittsburgh Post-Gazette (Scripps subsequently sold the rights to the Press to Post-Gazette parent Block Communications) and the Rocky Mountain News of Denver in 2009. In Columbus, after Dispatch executives cut off talks in 1982, Scripps-Howard chose to not purchase or build its own presses or to develop its own business operations, and instead sought more talks in an attempt to renew or replace the expiring contract. The Dispatch Printing Co. declined, and even publicly announced, in June 1983, its intentions to sever all ties with Scripps. A late-1985 Scripps strategy to sell the newspaper to independent businessman Nyles V. Reinfeld changed nothing, and The Columbus Citizen-Journal was published for the last time on December 31, 1985.

In an ironic twist, after The Columbus Dispatch newspaper and other print properties were purchased from the Dispatch Printing Co. by GateHouse Media in mid-2015, it announced that the newspaper's newsroom would relocate from the paper's former headquarters at 34 S. Third Street in Columbus to a building also purchased by GateHouse at 62 E. Broad Street – a building originally constructed in 1929 as the new home of The Ohio State Journal. The move was completed in February 2016.

== Notable personnel ==
- Managing Editor Jack Keller – 1932 Olympian who was thought to have won the bronze medal in the 110-meter hurdles until films showed otherwise.
