= 1938 Ohio's 4th congressional district special election =

- November 8, 1938

Ohio's 4th congressional district
Nominee	Walter H. Albaugh	Roy E. Layton
Party	Republican	Democratic
Popular vote	47,631	39,112
Percentage	54.9%	45.1%
U.S. Representative before election
Frank Le Blond Kloeb
Democratic
Elected U.S. Representative
Walter H. Albaugh
Republican

A special election was held in Ohio's 4th congressional district after the Democratic incumbent, Frank Le Blond Kloeb, resigned when he was appointed as a district court judge on the U.S. District Court for the Northern District of Ohio. Walter H. Albaugh, the winner, was elected to finish Kloeb's term.

The special election resulted in a gain for Republicans, picking up a seat that they had not held since five years prior to the election. The 4th district remained in solidly Republican hands after this election, and has not had a Democratic representative since Le Bond Kloeb's resignation.

The winner of this election, Walter H. Albaugh, was not a candidate for the next election. Robert F. Jones, also a Republican, won the election by 24.5 percentage points, a far greater margin than that of Albaugh's nine-point margin during this special election.

== Results ==
1938 Ohio's 4th congressional district special election
Party	Candidate	Votes	%
Republican	Walter H. Albaugh	47,631	54.91
Democratic	Roy E. Layton	39,112	45.09
Total votes		86,743	100.00
Republican gain from Democratic			
