= J. Edward Russell =

American politician

Joshua E. Russell
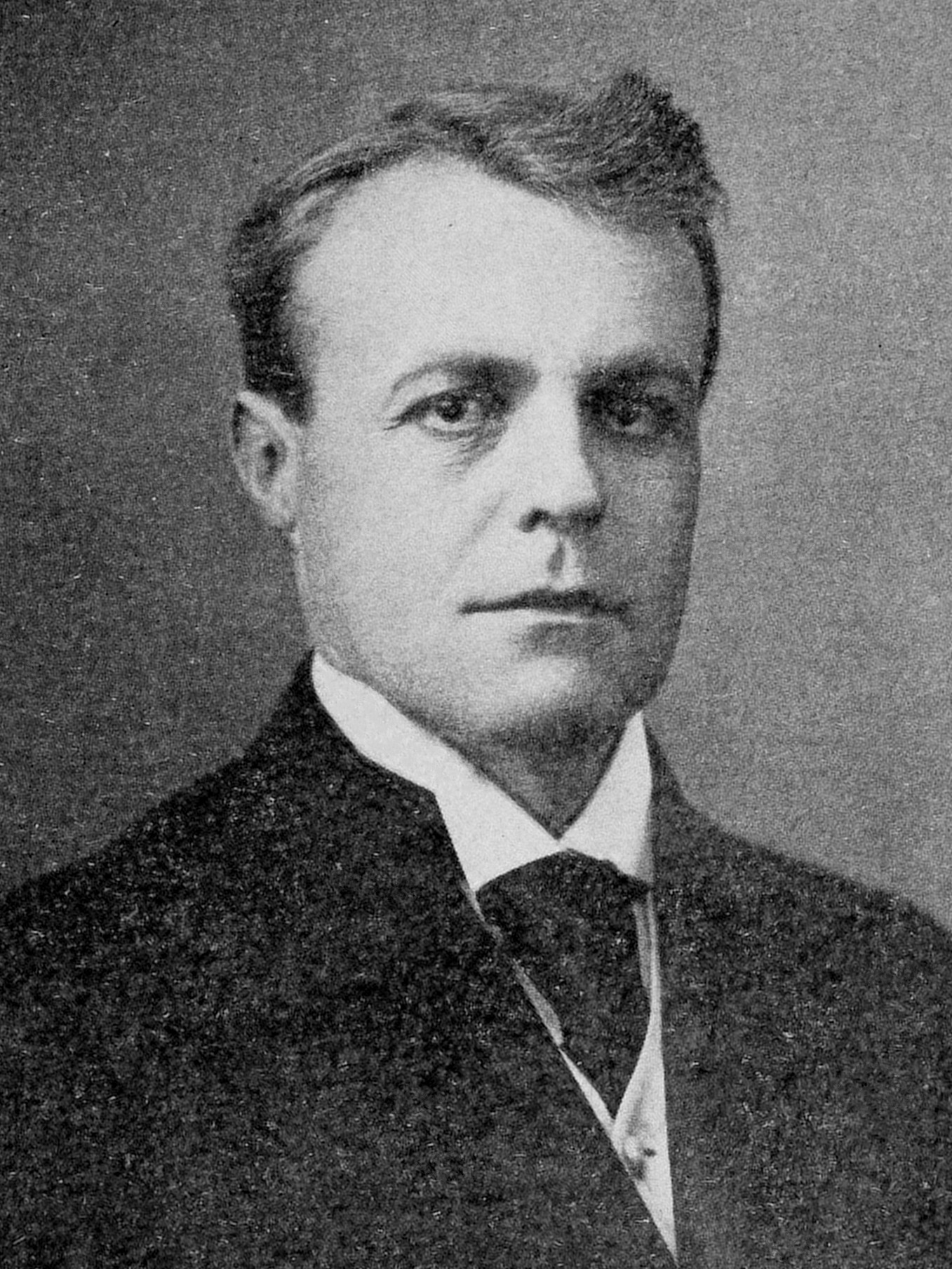
- Russell c. 1906

Member of the U.S. House of Representatives from Ohio's 4th district
- In office March 4, 1915 – March 3, 1917
- Preceded by: J. Henry Goeke
- Succeeded by: Benjamin F. Welty

Member of the Ohio Senate from the 12th district
- In office January 4, 1906 – January 3, 1909
- Preceded by: Orla E. Harrison
- Succeeded by: H. L. Yount

Personal details
- Born: Joshua Edward Russell; August 9, 1867 Sidney, Ohio, U.S.
- Died: June 21, 1953 (aged 85) Sidney, Ohio, U.S.
- Resting place: Graceland Cemetery
- Party: Republican
- Spouse: Jennie C. Laughlin
- Children: one

Joshua Edward Russell (August 9, 1867 – June 21, 1953) was an American politician who served one term as a U.S. representative from Ohio from 1915 to 1917.

== Early life ==
Russell was born near Sidney, Ohio on August 9, 1867. He attended the common schools and Sidney High School. He studied law with George A. Marshall.

== Career ==
He was admitted to the bar in 1893 and began a law practice in Sidney. He served as a member of the city board of education in 1894 and 1895. He was the city solicitor from 1895 to 1899. He served as a member of the Ohio Senate from 1905 to 1908.

=== Congress ===
Russell was elected as a Republican to the Sixty-fourth United States House of Representatives, serving from March 4, 1915, to March 3, 1917. He was an unsuccessful candidate for reelection in 1916.

He then resumed the practice of law.

== Personal life ==
Russell married Jennie C. Laughlin in 1894. They had one child. He was a member of the Masons, the Knights of Pythias, the Benevolent and Protective Order of Elks, and the Improved Order of Red Men.

== Death and burial ==
He died in Sidney, Ohio on June 21, 1953. He was interred in Graceland Cemetery.

== Sources ==
- United States Congress. "J. Edward Russell (id: R000534)". Biographical Directory of the United States Congress.

U.S. House of Representatives
Preceded by J. Henry Goeke	Member of the U.S. House of Representatives from Ohio's 5th congressional district 1915-1917	Succeeded by Benjamin F. Welty
