= Robert Franklin Jones =

American politician

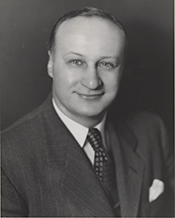

Member of the U.S. House of Representatives from Ohio's 4th district
- In office January 3, 1939 – September 2, 1947
- Preceded by: Walter H. Albaugh
- Succeeded by: William Moore McCulloch

Commissioner of the Federal Communications Commission
- In office September 5, 1947 – September 19, 1952
- Appointed by: Harry S. Truman

Personal details
- Born: June 25, 1907 Cairo, Ohio, US
- Died: June 22, 1968 (aged 60) Olney, Maryland, US
- Resting place: Lima Memorial Park, Lima, Ohio
- Party: Republican
- Education: Ohio Northern University Pettit College of Law

Robert Franklin Jones (June 25, 1907 – June 22, 1968) was a Republican member of the U.S. House of Representatives from Ohio for four terms from 1939 to 1947.

== Biography ==
Robert F. Jones was born in Cairo, Ohio. He graduated from the Lima Central High School in Lima, Ohio, in 1924, and in 1929 from Ohio Northern University in Ada, Ohio, with a law degree. He was admitted to the bar the same year and commenced practice in Lima. He served as prosecuting attorney of Allen County, Ohio, from 1935 to 1939.

Jones was elected in 1938 as a Republican to the Seventy-sixth and to the four succeeding Congresses. Jones was against isolationism and campaigned in favor of helping Britain throughout 1940. In between July 25, 1940, when France surrendered, and June 22, 1941, when the Nazis invaded the Soviet Union, Britain was effectively alone. During this time Jones, as well as his fellow Ohio congressmen Charles H. Elston and William E. Hess campaigned heavily in favor of giving Britain any aid we could. Jones explicitly advocated entering the war on the British side throughout this time period. He served until his resignation on September 2, 1947. His appointment to the Federal Communications Commission (FCC) by President Harry S. Truman was confirmed by the Senate, and he served as FCC commissioner from September 5, 1947, until his resignation on September 19, 1952. His appointment provoked controversy after it was revealed that he'd become a member of the Black Legion in the 1930s in exchange for being elected the local county prosecutor.

=== Death ===
He resumed the practice of law in Washington, D.C., and died in Olney, Maryland, on June 22, 1968. Interment in Lima Memorial Park Cemetery in Lima, Ohio.

Government offices
Preceded by Edward M. Webster	Chairman of the Federal Communications Commission; September 1947–September 1952	Succeeded by Wayne Coy

== Sources ==
- United States Congress. "Robert Franklin Jones (id: J000249)". Biographical Directory of the United States Congress.
- The Political Graveyard

U.S. House of Representatives
Preceded by Frank L. Kloeb	Member of the U.S. House of Representatives from Ohio's 4th congressional district 1939–1947	Succeeded by William M. McCulloch
