= 71st Ohio Infantry Regiment =

- Active: September 1861 to November 30, 1865
- Country: United States
- Allegiance: Union
- Branch: Infantry
- Engagements: Battle of Shiloh; Battle of Riggins Hill; Atlanta campaign; Siege of Atlanta; Battle of Lovejoy's Station; Battle of Jonesboro; Franklin-Nashville Campaign; Battle of Franklin; Battle of Nashville

The 71st Ohio Infantry Regiment, sometimes 71st Ohio Volunteer Infantry (or 71st OVI) was an infantry regiment in the Union Army during the American Civil War.

== Service ==
The 71st Ohio Infantry was organized at Camp Tod in Troy, Ohio September 1861 through January 1862 and mustered in for three years service on February 1, 1862, under the command of Colonel Rodney Mason.

The regiment was attached to District of Paducah, Kentucky, to March 1862. 2nd Brigade, 5th Division, Army of the Tennessee, to April 1862. Garrison at Fort Donelson, Tennessee, to June 1863. 1st Brigade, 3rd Division, Reserve Corps, Department of the Cumberland, to September 1863. Post of Gallatin, Tennessee, Department of the Cumberland, to April 1864. Unassigned, 4th Division, XX Corps, Department of the Cumberland, to August 1864. 2nd Brigade, 3rd Division, IV Corps, Army of the Cumberland, to June 1865. 1st Brigade, 3rd Division, IV Corps, to August 1865. Department of Texas to November 1865.

The 71st Ohio Infantry mustered out of service at San Antonio, Texas, on November 30, 1865.

== Detailed service ==
Ordered to Paducah, Ky., February 10. Reconnaissance toward Columbus, Ky., February 25-March 3, 1862. Action at and occupation of Columbus March 3. Moved from Paducah, Ky., to Savannah, Tenn., March 6–10. Expedition to Yellow Creek, Miss., and occupation of Pittsburg Landing, Tenn., March 14–17. Battle of Shiloh, April 6–7.

At Shiloh, Colonel Rodney Mason, the regimental commander, fled from field on horseback. ُThe rest of the regiment soon joined in "a wild, disorganized stampede."

Ordered to Fort Donelson, Tenn., April 16. Garrison duty at Fort Donelson and Clarksville, Tenn., and operations in northern and middle Tennessee until August. Action at Clarksville August 18. Post surrendered by Col. Mason who along with his officers was cashiered by the President. Fort Donelson August 25 (Companies A, B, G, and H). Cumberland Iron Works August 26 (Companies A, B, G, and H). Expedition to Clarksville September 5–10. Pickett's Hill, Clarksville, September 7. Garrison duty at Forts Donelson and Henry, Tenn., until August 1863. Guard duty along Louisville & Nashville Railroad (headquarters at Gallatin, Tenn.) until July 1864. Expedition from Gallatin to Carthage October 10–14, 1863 (detachment). Near Hartsville October 10 (detachment). Expedition from Gallatin to Cumberland Mountains January 28-February 8. Winchester May 10 (detachment). Relieved from garrison duty July 1864, and ordered to join Sherman's Army before Atlanta, Ga. Atlanta Campaign July 31-September 8. Siege of Atlanta July 31-August 25. Flank movement on Jonesboro August 25–30. Battle of Jonesboro August 31-September 1. Operations against Hood in northern Georgia and northern Alabama September 29-November 3. At Athens, Ga., October 31-November 23. March to Columbia, Tenn., November 23–24. Nashville Campaign November–December. Columbia, Duck River, November 24–27. Battle of Franklin November 30. Battle of Nashville December 15–16. Pursuit of Hood to the Tennessee River December 17–28. Moved to Huntsville, Ala., and duty there until March 1865. Operations in eastern Tennessee March 15-April 22. Duty at Strawberry Plains and Nashville until June. Ordered to New Orleans, La., June 16, thence moved to Texas. Duty at San Antonio until November.

== Casualties ==
The regiment lost a total of 206 men during service; 3 officers and 66 enlisted men killed or mortally wounded, 5 officers and 132 enlisted men died of disease.

== Commanders ==
- Colonel Rodney Mason - resigned August 22, 1862
- Colonel Henry Kumler McConnell- promoted to Brevet Brigadier General, March 13, 1865; mustered out with regiment November 30, 1865
- Lieutenant Colonel James H. Hart - commanded at Battle of Nashville (not to be confused with Major James H. Hart of the 1st New Jersey Cavalry)
- Captain William H. McClure - commanded at Battle of Nashville

== Notable members ==
- Corporal Charles Marley Anderson, Company B - U.S. Representative from Ohio, 1885–1887
- Captain Elihu S. Williams, Company H - U.S. Representative from Ohio, 1887–1891

== See also ==
- List of Ohio Civil War units
- Ohio in the Civil War
