= William M. McCulloch =

American politician (1901–1980)

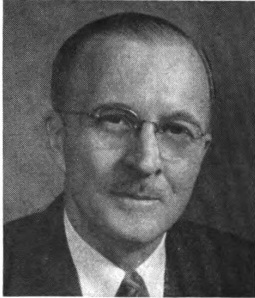

Member of the U.S. House of Representatives from Ohio's 4th district
- In office November 4, 1947 – January 3, 1973
- Preceded by: Robert Franklin Jones
- Succeeded by: Tennyson Guyer

Member of the Ohio House of Representatives
- In office 1933–1944

Personal details
- Born: William Moore McCulloch; November 24, 1901 Holmesville, Ohio, U.S.
- Died: February 22, 1980 (aged 78) Washington, D.C., U.S.
- Resting place: Arlington National Cemetery
- Party: Republican
- Spouse: Mabel Harris (m. 1927)
- Children: Nancy McCulloch; Ann McCulloch
- Education: College of Wooster; Ohio State University

William Moore McCulloch (November 24, 1901 – February 22, 1980) was an American lawyer and politician who served as a Republican U.S. Representative for Ohio's 4th congressional district from 1947 to 1973.

== Early life and education ==
McCulloch was born near Holmesville, Ohio on November 24, 1901 to James H. and Ida M. McCulloch. He graduated from the College of Wooster in Wooster, Ohio in 1923. He graduated from the college of law of Ohio State University at Columbus, Ohio, in 1925. He was admitted to the bar the same year and commenced practice in Piqua, Ohio with George Barry.

== Career ==
He was a member of the Ohio House of Representatives from 1933 to 1944 and served as minority leader from 1936 to 1939 and as speaker from 1939 to 1944. During his tenure in the House of Representatives, the black population in Piqua was 2.7% and a majority of his constituents were white conservatives, yet he began supporting equal rights and the NAACP, identifying the Civil Rights movement with its goals of constitutional rights.

He served in the United States Army from December 26, 1943, to October 12, 1945. During his tenure in the Army, he served as a captain in the Military Government Forces in Europe.

McCulloch was elected as a Republican to the Eightieth Congress, by special election, on November 4, 1947, to fill the vacancy caused by the resignation of Republican Robert Franklin Jones. He was re-elected to twelve consecutive Congresses. During his time in office, the 4th Ohio Congressional District at times included the counties of Allen, Hardin, Mercer, Auglaize, Darke, Shelby, Miami, Preble and a part of Montgomery and he won 65-70 percent of the votes in each election. He was a fiscal conservative and would return the unused office allowance to the U.S. Treasury at the end of each term.

In 1959, he became the ranking Republican on the House Judiciary Committee until his retirement in 1973. He also held seats on the Joint Committee on Atomic Energy, the Joint Committee on Immigration and National Policy, and the Select Committee on Small Business. In 1967, President Lyndon B. Johnson appointed him to the National Advisory Commission on Civil Disorders (Kerner Commission) and in 1968 the Presidential Commission on the Causes and Prevention of Violence (Eisenhower Commission).

=== Fight for civil rights ===
As the ranking member of the House of Representatives Judiciary Committee, McCulloch took a leading role in the civil rights movement. His introduction of a comprehensive civil rights bill in 1963, for example, together with Representatives John Lindsay of New York and Charles Mathias of Maryland, put pressure on President John F. Kennedy to present his own act to Congress several months later. His district was very white and so he had few votes to gain from introducing or supporting legislating on civil rights. McCulloch's influence with the Civil Rights Act led President John F. Kennedy to declare, "Without him it can't be done." McCulloch was recognized by Kennedy's successor, Lyndon B. Johnson, under whom the act was passed, as "the most important and powerful political force" in passing the Act.

Todd Purdum, in his history of the Civil Rights Era, An Idea Whose Time Has Come, said in an interview:

[McCullough] had been distressed when then Senate Majority Leader Johnson watered down civil rights bills in 1957 and 1960 to make them practically unenforceable. McCulloch was the ranking minority member of the House judiciary committee, and he told the Kennedy Administration that he would back a strong bill in the House and urge his fellow Republicans to follow suit. That was only if the White House agreed not to trade away the bill's strongest provisions in the Senate and also to give Republicans equal credit for passing it.

McCulloch voted in favor of the Civil Rights Acts of 1957, 1960, 1964, and 1968, the Voting Rights Act of 1965, and the Open Housing Act of 1968. In 1970, he opposed the Nixon administration's efforts to weaken temporary provisions in the 1965 Voting Rights Act regarding voting rights of blacks in the South.

Despite his leadership to pass the Civil Rights Acts, McCulloch did not have many votes to gain from his district but felt that it was his obligation to implement constitutional rights. In 1971, Jacqueline Kennedy Onassis wrote a letter to McCulloch, crediting him as being one of the most important people for the civil rights legislation in the 1960s.

=== Other issues ===
A conservative Republican who notably got a 0% from the Americans for Democratic Action and a 100% rating from Americans for Constitutional Action in 1961, McCulloch believed that federal authority should not usurp state and local authority. After 1964, however, McCulloch moderated his views, being one of six Republican House representatives from Ohio to support the Medicare program for the elderly, and the Medicaid program for poor people. In 1969, he received a 33% rating from Americans for Constitutional Action. He also was supportive of the Gun Control Act of 1968 and the Comprehensive Child Development Act of 1971 that was vetoed by Nixon. Much like his friend and collaborator in civil rights legislation, New York Democrat Emanuel Celler, McCulloch opposed the Equal Rights Amendment. Earlier in the late 40's, McCulloch supported the Social Security Amendments of 1949 and an amendment on the National Housing Act of 1949 to extend mortgage provisions.

Between his primary win in 1970 and the general election, McCulloch fell in his DC apartment and had surgery to remove a blood clot in his brain associated with the fall. In December, further surgery was required, now on his abdomen. He missed much of the first session of the 92nd Congress due to his health issues. On June 8, 1971, he announced he would not be a candidate for re-election in the 1972 election to the Ninety-third Congress.

== Personal life ==
On October 17, 1927, McCulloch eloped with Mabel Harris in Covington, Kentucky. They had two daughters, Nancy and Ann.

== Death and legacy ==
McCulloch died on February 22, 1980, in Washington, D.C. due to a heart attack. He is buried in Arlington National Cemetery with his wife. In the film All the Way, Congressman McCulloch is portrayed by Dan Desmond.

In early 2010, McCulloch was proposed by the Ohio Historical Society as a finalist in a statewide vote for inclusion in Statuary Hall at the United States Capitol.

McCulloch was the subject of the JFK Profiles in Courage 2017 winning essay by student Daud Shad.

Representative Richard Walker Bolling (D-MO) said of McCulloch upon his passing: "This country will always owe a major debt to Bill McCulloch. If it had not been for Bill McCulloch, there would have been no civil rights legislation." Representative Thomas Railsback (R-IL) credited McCulloch as doing more for civil rights than any other member of the House, along with his friend Emmanuel Celler.

== Notes ==
U.S. House of Representatives
Preceded by Robert Franklin Jones	Member of the U.S. House of Representatives from Ohio's 4th congressional district 1947–1973	Succeeded by Tennyson Guyer
Preceded by Kenneth Keating	Ranking Member of the House Judiciary Committee; 1959–1973	Succeeded by J. Edward Hutchinson
