= William B. Ebbert =

American politician

William Baltzell Ebbert
- Born: February 28, 1846
- Died: February 27, 1927 (aged 80)
- Military career
- Allegiance: United States
- Branch: Union Army
- Unit: 1st Regiment West Virginia Infantry Volunteers
- Conflicts: American Civil War

William Baltzell Ebbert (February 28, 1846 – February 27, 1927) was an officer and adjutant in the Union Army (1st Regiment West Virginia Infantry Volunteers), a Colorado legislator, newspaper publisher, author, farmer, businessman, and poet. Ebbert published the Pueblo Review and Standard newspaper in 1890, authored the landmark meat inspection legislation in Colorado in 1889 and battled with Prohibitionists in the 1910s. As a Director of the Montezuma Valley Irrigation District from 1911 to 1920, he guided the district through turbulent times and helped engineer its dissolution and reemergence as the Montezuma Valley Irrigation Company in 1920.

A newspaper article in 1911 touted him as a candidate for the U.S. Senate, and perhaps best describes the respect he commanded: "His record for good works for Colorado is not excelled by any living man and he would command the respect and wield an influence in the highest legislative body in the land that would be beneficial to not only his state but to the nation at large."

Ebbert was the patriarch of a farming family in the Cortez, Rocky Ford and Pueblo areas of Colorado. Ebbert's father, John Van Kirk Ebbert, was the cousin of Congressman George Ebbert Seney (Ohio Democrat, served 1883–1891).

In addition to writing for various newspapers and magazines, William B. Ebbert also authored a compilation of his writings and poetry, "On Colorado's Fair Mesas" in 1897.

Ebbert represented the counties of Pueblo, Otero, and Montezuma in the Colorado General Assembly in the late 19th and early 20th centuries. Ebbert was born in Wheeling, West Virginia. He was the only son of Charlotte Baltzell and John Van Kirk Ebbert, of Fayette County, Pennsylvania. After several years in the Union Army, he moved briefly to Covington, Kentucky and the Cincinnati, Ohio area. On Christmas Day, 1866, at age 20, he married Cornelia Blanche Hall in Wheeling. After Cornelia's death in 1881, William B. Ebbert and his three children (Blanche, Edith, and William) moved to the Pueblo, Colorado area and took up farming. He soon met and married Catherine Scheutle in 1884 in Pueblo. William and Catherine produced three more boys in Colorado; all died at prematurely. In Colorado, Ebbert established himself as a community leader, author, and politician. He served several years in the Colorado Legislature, representing Dolores, Otero, Pueblo, and Montezuma counties. Legendary railroad chieftain Otto Mears bestowed upon Ebbert one of his rare silver railroad passes in 1889 (Silverton Railroad Pass No. 193). After a respected life in the military, agriculture, and politics, William B. Ebbert died on February 27, 1927, in Cortez, Colorado. It was just one day before his 81st birthday. He is buried at the Lewis Cemetery, a few miles north of Cortez, Colorado.

== Military service in the Union Army ==
=== 1861–1865: 1st Regiment, West Virginia Infantry Volunteers ===
Only 15 years old when he enlisted in 1861, Ebbert rose from private to sergeant major by 1864. Soon after, West Virginia Governor Arthur Boreman commissioned William B. Ebbert as a first lieutenant at the age of 18. Colonel Weddle then appointed Ebbert as acting adjutant.

Ebbert fought in many famous American Civil War battles, including battles in the Shenandoah Valley (Winchester, Port Republic, and Second Bull Run). He had lied about his age so he could enlist in the Union Army in 1861 at the age of 15. Ebbert served in the 1st West Virginia Infantry Volunteers, Company A and later in Company H. (His father, John Van Kirk Ebbert, enlisted in 1861 at age 46, and served as a sergeant in Company I, 1st West Virginia Infantry Volunteers, and later as corporal, Independent Pennsylvania Battery H, Light Artillery.)

Ebbert often faced troops led by Stonewall Jackson, and engaged in battles in the Shenandoah Valley, Virginia, under General Shield, General Sheridan, and others.

His first engagement was near Winchester on March 25, 1862. He wrote:

we drove back Jackson. We were under the hottest fire at Port Republic afterwards, where we lost nearly half my company -were defeated, routed, and pursued for 14 miles by Confederate cavalry, which never ceased firing on us during our retreat.

He wrote further:

I was in the 2nd Bull Run defeat under Pope and in many small engagements under different commands, was made Sergeant Major of our Regiment after serving 2 or more years; then after another year or more our Colonel surprised my by handing me a commission from Gov. Boreman of W. Va. as 1st Lieutenant, was appointed by the Colonel Acting Adjutant which gave me a horse to ride while on the march and which as Lieutenant, was chiefly interesting to me because my pay enabled me to send home more money to my mother. My pay as private was I think, first $11 a month, afterward $16, as Sergeant Major $26 a month, as 1st Lieut. about $149 a month. I never sought nor expected promotion – for there were better and better looking soldiers than I was, but my promotion happened and I did the best I could with it. Our Col Weddle had a warm spot for me, and through him my advancement occurred. Our 1st Col (Thoburn) was killed the day of Sheridan's ride, and just before Sheridan reached the front. Weddle had been our Lieutenant Col. Thoburn was ambitious and reckless of his life. Weddle was steady and brave, not pushing his men needlessly into danger.

=== Men who served in the Union Army Regiment with Ebbert ===
- Ebbert served under General Shield, General Sheridan, and others.
- Colonel Thoburn (Thoburn was killed the day of Sheridan's ride. Ebbert described him as "ambitious and reckless of his life.")
- Colonel Weddle (Ebbert notes that "Weddle was steady and brave, not pushing his men needlessly into danger."
- Sergeant John Van Kirk Ebbert, his father.

== Service in the Colorado Legislature: "a farmer in politics" ==
Ebbert served in the Colorado General Assembly from 1889 to 1890 as a Republican, and 1907–1908 and 1911–1912 as a Democrat. He represented Pueblo, Dolores, Otero, and Montezuma counties in the lower house.

He was chairman of the powerful Assembly Rules Committee and served on various other committees. Ebbert ran for Speaker of the Assembly in 1911.

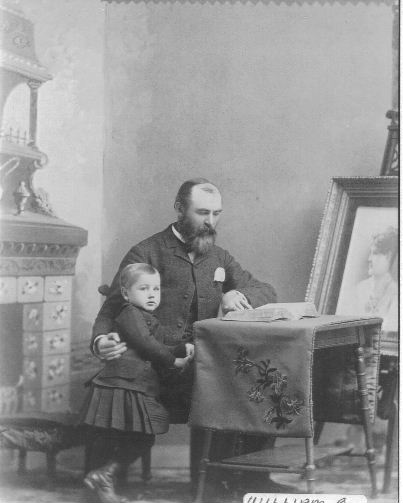
Ebbert and son Wilson in 1890. Wilson (also known as "Jim") would die at age 36.

=== Committee and leadership positions ===
- Chairman, Rules Committee (1889)
- Chairman, Education, Finance Ways and Means Committee (1889)
- Revision and Constitution Committee
- State Institutions Committee
- Chairman, Federal Relations Committee (1911, 1912)
- Indian and Military Affairs
- Insurance Committee
- Mercantile and Manufacturing Interests
- Public Lands Committee
- Stock Committee
- Towns and Cities

== Agricultural leader ==
Upon arriving in Colorado in 1881, Ebbert quickly built up his farming business. He held numerous offices in the agricultural and business communities:

- President, Valley Beet Growers Association
- President, Capital Hill Melon Grower's Association (Newdale, Colorado)
- President, Rocky Ford Creamery Company
- Presided over Farmers' Institutes
- City Board of Trade
- Director, Montezuma Valley Irrigation District

His legislation in 1889 required inspection of meats 24 hours before slaughter, helping protect consumers from spoiled foreign meat products and assisting Colorado's cattle industry. As a successful sugar beet farmer, Ebbert battled against big sugar companies for farmers' rights.

== Ebbert's treatise on dirty politics: "Titles are Trash" ==
Although Ebbert is most notable for his dealings with agricultural issues, he also tussled with Prohibitionists of the time, culminating in his impassioned writings on the shamefulness of dirty politics and political mudslinging.

Ebbert publicly supported local control over the legality of liquor (i.e., the "Local Option"). Prohibitionists and some clergy sought to unseat him. During the 1910 Assembly elections, the Anti-Saloon League of Denver and various religious leaders targeted Ebbert for defeat. It is in this battle that Ebbert delivered one of his finest political statements to date. After narrowly winning reelection despite an eleventh hour "hit piece" mailer sent by activist preacher Rev. E.E. McLaughlin, Ebbert retorted:

The election is over, but I am not quite through with life, and it is important to me, that in this community where I, and eight members of my family have established our homes, and where I expect to live out my days, and where I wish to enjoy and respect of my neighbors, as I shall in turn accord them respect, --it is important to me, I say, that I shall not be overwhelmed by the false evidence of any man, or set of men, however imposing their title, or whatever attitude of superiority they see fit to assume.

Titles are trash. A league is good if its good. An untruth is an untruth whether spoken by a pauper or a prince. E.E. McLaughlin, pretending to have the evidence of my perfidy during the whole of my campaign did not produce it till the last hours of the last week before election when any reply was shut out. Eleventh hour attacks are not new in campaigns, but did the reader ever know of one whose author was not a groveller and an irresponsibilist? I know McLaughlin. He is one of the fussy, spluttering Denver stripplings who buss around the statehouse and think they are running something.

He commanded me a few weeks ago to report to him within twenty-four hours how I stood on the Local Option question on pain of being blacklisted. Think of it! Being an American sovereign, and not the cringing servant of any man, and having been a local optionist before he was born, I resented his astounding impertinence and defied him. But mark you, my reader, I did not invite dishonor or stealth. I spoke out as a self-respecting man, giving him to understand that, if elected, I would be answerable to the people whose credentials I bore and to no one else on earth. This was the head and front of my offense – my only offense. Because I would not fall down and worship this lone, apostle and champion of virtue he decreed my political death at any cost, even at the cost of his own honor.

I was born and raised and have ever lived in an atmosphere that would forbid me to descend to the level of this man, this "Reverend" who is a defilement to the pure and holy cause of the Nazarene, which he is supposed to advance. I now solemnly avow that every statement, direct or by implication, every quotation from the House Journal, and every innuendo bearing against me, in every letter that I have seen, except the single statement as to the effect of my final vote, is false; and McLaughlin was and is in a position to know that it is false.

The Hon. W.J. Blatchford, of this city, my esteemed friend, and my next neighbor every day of the session of the 16th assembly, has read the foregoing and he wished me to say that, knowing all the facts, he holds E.E. McLaughlin to be a reckless traducer and defamest, and unworthy of credence by any self-respecting community.

== Ebbert as poet ==
Ebbert was known as a great orator and poet and possessed a striking command of the English language. He published his writings in the 1897 book, On Colorado's Fair Mesas. The following poem is published in the book:

COLORADO

What hand shall sweep the trembling strings
That hold a symphony divine,
The meed that lavish nature brings—
Where sits enthroned the columbine?

There is no art, aspiring, high,
Can move the soul as these do mine—
These glories of the earth and sky
Where blows the chosen columbine.

Yon monarch peak! What touch but mars
Its breast on which clouds recline?
Whose head is pillowed with the stars—
Where sleeps below the columbine.

Here fan the plain the west winds mild,
The dreamy vale, the wanton vine;
There canons crash with thunders wild,
Where hides the timid columbine.

The pioneers, with hearts unmoved,
Who came t' unlock the treasured mine,
Beholding, paused and pausing, loved,
Where sweetly blooms the columbine.

Now on the trail gleam hearthstones bright,
And fanes proclaim the sacred shrine,
And cities rise in grace and might,
Where proudly waves the columbine.

Fair State, commanding, hopeful, strong—
Thy sons' the virtues that are thine—
May God thy days in peace prolong,
Where fondly glows the columbine.

Clyde Ebbert Walter, Catherine & William B. Ebbert at the Ebbert Ranch circa 1924.

== Family life: untimely death of children ==
Ebbert reared nine children over a 22-year period. Six of the nine children died prematurely.

In Cincinnati:

- Louis died of pneumonia at age 9 months;
- Cornelia died of cholera at 1 year; and
- an unnamed baby boy died at age 23 days.

In Colorado:

- Wilson died of "stomach problems" at age 36;
- Irving died of diabetes at age 19; and
- Wolcott died of leukemia at age 19.

Only one son survived: William Dickinson Ebbert (1876–1951), and two daughters, Blanche (1868–1952) and Edith (1872–1946).

William Ebbert's first wife Cornelia, circa 1880. She died after childbirth in 1881.

Ebbert's first wife Cornelia died on July 5, 1881, in Cincinnati, Ohio a few weeks after the birth of their sixth child. The baby and mother are interred at Oak Grove Cemetery in Cincinnati.

By 1881, two of William and Cornelia's children had died as infants. While giving birth to their sixth child, Cornelia died. The baby died a few weeks later, making it the third child to die. After Cornelia's death in 1881, Ebbert moved to Colorado and married Catherine Scheutle on July 1, 1884, near Pueblo.

The Ebbert Ranch was located outside Cortez, Colorado, near Arriola.

The Ebbert clan had lived in several locations in Colorado over the years: first in Pueblo, then Rocky Ford, and later settling in Montezuma County. The Ebbert Ranch was located off U.S. Route 491 (formerly Hwy 666), 9.58 miles north of Cortez, just south of a large irrigation flume that crosses over the freeway. (It is located on the east half of the SW one quarter and lots 3 and 4 of Section 7, Twp. 37, North of Range 16, west of the New Mexico Prime Meridian.) The Ebbert ranch house was built in 1908 and is still standing.

== Memorable quotations ==
- "Titles are trash. A league is good if its good. An untruth is an untruth whether spoken by a pauper or a prince." November 21, 1910.
- "He is one of the fussy, spluttering Denver stripplings who buss around the statehouse and think they are running something." (In reference to Anti-Saloon League activist E.E. McLaughlin.)

== See also ==
- Congressman George Ebbert Seney (D-Ohio), Delegate to Democratic National Convention, 1876. Author of Seney's Ohio Code.
- Link to George Ebbert Seney in the Political Graveyard.
- Ebbert family of Uniontown, Pennsylvania (ancestors of John Van Kirk Ebbert)
