= Martin K. Gantz =

American lawyer and politician (1862–1916)

Martin Kissinger Gantz
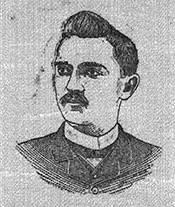

Member of the U.S. House of Representatives from Ohio's 4th district
- In office March 4, 1891 – March 3, 1893
- Preceded by: Samuel S. Yoder
- Succeeded by: Fernando C. Layton

Personal details
- Born: January 28, 1862 Miami County, Ohio, U.S.
- Died: February 10, 1916 (aged 54) Troy, Ohio, U.S.
- Resting place: Riverside Cemetery, Troy, Ohio
- Party: Democratic
- Education: National Normal University; Cincinnati Law School

Martin Kissinger Gantz (January 28, 1862 – February 10, 1916) was an American lawyer and politician who served as a U.S. representative from Ohio for one term from 1891 to 1893.

== Early life and career ==
Born in Bethel Township, Miami County, Ohio, Gantz attended the common schools and National Normal University, Lebanon, Ohio. He was graduated from the Cincinnati Law School in 1883. He was admitted to the bar in 1883 and commenced practice in Troy, Ohio. He served as mayor of the city of Troy in 1889.

== Congress ==
Gantz was elected as a Democrat to the Fifty-second Congress (March 4, 1891 – March 3, 1893). He was an unsuccessful candidate for reelection in 1892 to the Fifty-third Congress.

== Later career and death ==
He resumed the practice of law in Troy.

He served as commissioner from the State of Ohio to the Louisiana Purchase Exposition in 1904. He served as delegate to all Democratic State conventions from 1892 to 1906. He served as delegate to the 1908 Democratic National Convention.

He represented the United States State Department on the directorate of El Banco Nacional de Nicaragua y El Ferrocarril del Pacífico de Nicaragua in 1914 and 1915.

=== Death ===
He died in Troy, Ohio, February 10, 1916. He was interred in Riverside Cemetery.

== Sources ==
- United States Congress. "Martin K. Gantz (id: G000043)". Biographical Directory of the United States Congress.

U.S. House of Representatives
Preceded by Samuel S. Yoder	Member of the U.S. House of Representatives from Ohio's 4th congressional district 1891–1893	Succeeded by Fernando C. Layton
