= John L. Cable =

American politician

John Levi Cable
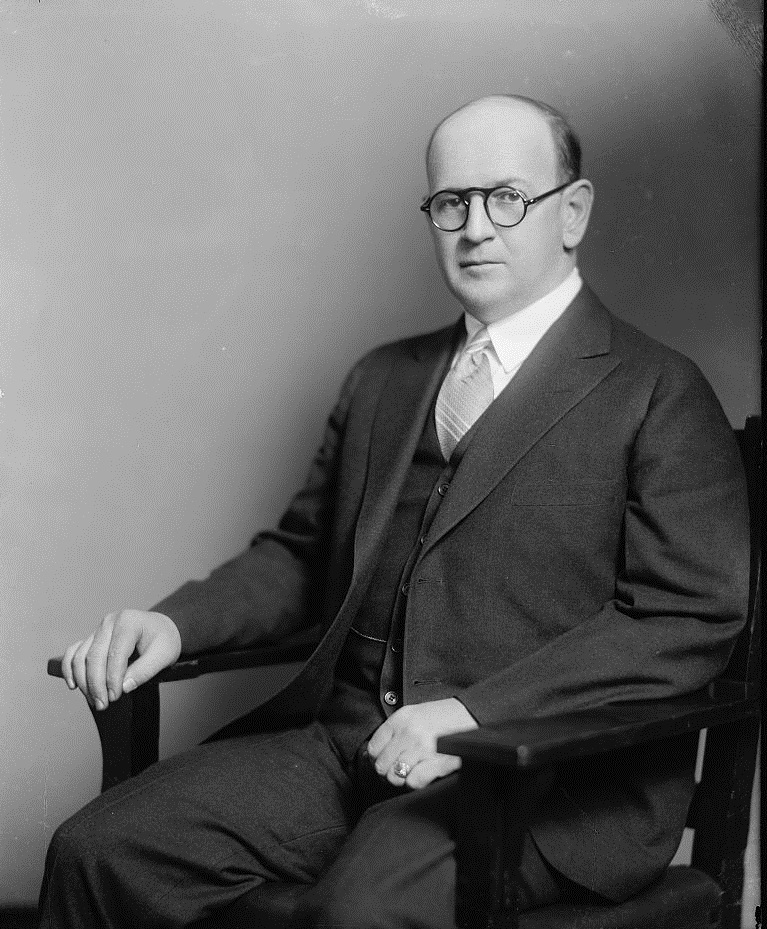

Member of the U.S. House of Representatives from Ohio's 4th district
- In office March 4, 1921 – March 3, 1925
- Preceded by: Benjamin F. Welty
- Succeeded by: William T. Fitzgerald
- In office March 4, 1929 – March 3, 1933
- Preceded by: William T. Fitzgerald
- Succeeded by: Frank Le Blond Kloeb

Personal details
- Born: April 15, 1884 Lima, Ohio, U.S.
- Died: September 15, 1971 (aged 87) Lima, Ohio, U.S.
- Resting place: Woodlawn Cemetery, Lima, Ohio
- Party: Republican
- Education: Kenyon College; George Washington University Law School

John Levi Cable (April 15, 1884 – September 15, 1971) was a U.S. representative from Ohio and a great-grandson of Joseph Cable.

Born in Lima, Ohio, Cable attended public school. He received his undergraduate education from Kenyon College in Gambier, Ohio. Later he earned an LL.B. in 1906, and from the George Washington University Law School, Washington, D.C., he earned a J.D. in 1909. He was admitted to the bar in 1909 and commenced practice in Lima, Ohio. He served as prosecuting attorney of Allen County from 1917 to 1921.

Cable was elected as a Republican to the Sixty-seventh and Sixty-eighth Congresses (March 4, 1921 – March 3, 1925). He served as chairman of the Committee on Alcoholic Liquor Traffic (Sixty-eighth Congress). He was not a candidate for renomination in 1924. He resumed the practice of law.

Cable was again elected to the Seventy-first Congress. He was reelected to the Seventy-second Congress (March 4, 1929 – March 3, 1933). He was an unsuccessful candidate for reelection in 1932 to the Seventy-third Congress. He resumed the practice of law. He served as special assistant to Ohio Attorney General 1933-1937. He served as special counsel to the Reconstruction Finance Corporation in the liquidation of the Lima First American Bank & Trust Co. He was appointed Government appeal agent of Selective Service Board No. 2, Lima, Ohio from 1948 to 1960. He was author and publisher. He died in Lima, Ohio, on September 15, 1971. He is entombed in a niche in St. Boniface Episcopal Church, Sarasota, Florida.

Cable was particularly interested in questions of citizenship and wrote several books on the topic. He was the motivating force behind the Cable Act of 1922. Cable was married to Rhea Watson of Lima, Ohio in 1911. They had two children. He was a Freemason.

U.S. House of Representatives
Preceded by Benjamin F. Welty	Member of the U.S. House of Representatives from Ohio's 4th congressional district 1921–1925	Succeeded by William T. Fitzgerald
Preceded by William T. Fitzgerald	Member of the U.S. House of Representatives from Ohio's 4th congressional district 1929–1933	Succeeded by Frank Le Blond Kloeb
