= John A. McMahon =

American politician

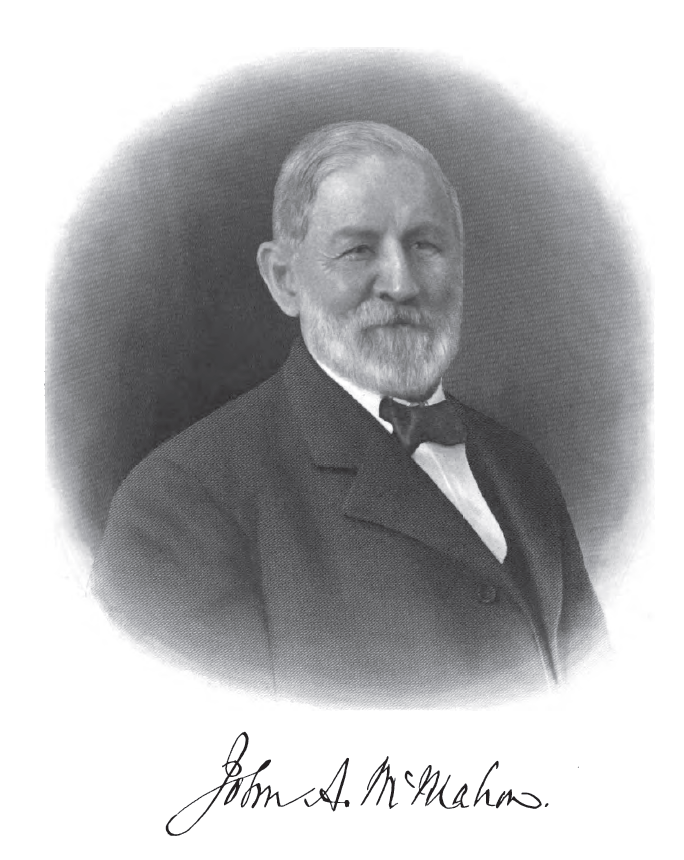

Member of the U.S. House of Representatives from Ohio
- In office March 4, 1875 – March 3, 1881
- Preceded by: Lewis B. Gunckel
- Succeeded by: Henry Lee Morey
- Constituency: 4th district (1875–1879); 3rd district (1879–1881)

7th Ohio State Bar Association President
- In office December 29, 1886 – December 28, 1887
- Preceded by: William J. Gilmore
- Succeeded by: E. P. Green

Personal details
- Born: February 19, 1833 Frederick County, Maryland, U.S.
- Died: March 8, 1923 (aged 90) Dayton, Ohio, U.S.
- Resting place: Woodland Cemetery
- Party: Democratic
- Spouse: Mollie R. Sprigg
- Children: two
- Education: Xavier

John A. McMahon (February 19, 1833 – March 8, 1923) was a three-term United States representative from Ohio from 1875 to 1881. He was the nephew of Clement Vallandigham, another representative from Ohio.

== Biography ==
McMahon was born in Frederick County, Maryland, and graduated from St. Xavier College in 1849. He taught at Xavier for a year, and settled in Dayton, Ohio, in 1852. He studied law with his uncle, Vallandigham, and was admitted to the bar in 1854, forming a partnership with his uncle. In 1861 he formed a partnership with George W. Houk, which lasted 19 years.

=== Congress ===
He was elected to the Forty-fourth, Forty-fifth, and Forty-sixth United States Congresses, from 1875 until 1881.

McMahon was appointed by the House of Representatives as a manager to conduct impeachment proceedings against Secretary of War William W. Belknap.

He was unsuccessful for re-election in 1880.

=== Later career ===
He returned to private law practice in Dayton. He served as the president of the Ohio State Bar Association in 1886, and was a losing candidate for the Senate in 1889.

=== Death and burial ===
He died in Dayton and was buried in Woodland Cemetery.

== Family ==
McMahon was married January 23, 1861, to Mollie R. Sprigg, of Cumberland, Maryland. They had a son, J. Sprigg McMahon, and daughter, Louise McMahon.

U.S. House of Representatives
Preceded by Lewis B. Gunckel	Member of the U.S. House of Representatives from Ohio's 4th congressional district 1875–1879	Succeeded by J. Warren Keifer
Preceded by Mills Gardner	Member of the U.S. House of Representatives from Ohio's 3rd congressional district 1879–1881	Succeeded by Henry Lee Morey
