= John F. McKinney =

American politician (1827–1903)

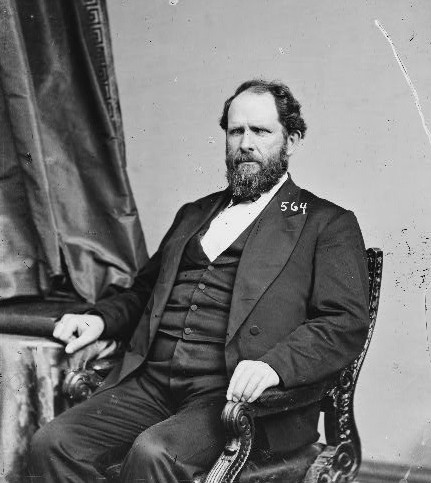
- McKinney, 1860–1875

Member of the U.S. House of Representatives from Ohio's 4th district
- In office March 4, 1863 – March 3, 1865
- Preceded by: William Allen
- Succeeded by: William Lawrence
- In office March 4, 1871 – March 3, 1873
- Preceded by: William Lawrence
- Succeeded by: Lewis B. Gunckel

Personal details
- Born: John Franklin McKinney; April 12, 1827 Piqua, Ohio, U.S.
- Died: June 13, 1903 (aged 76) Piqua, Ohio, U.S.
- Resting place: Forest Hill Cemetery, Piqua, Ohio
- Party: Democratic
- Spouse: Louisa Wood
- Children: seven
- Education: Ohio Wesleyan University

John Franklin McKinney (April 12, 1827 – June 13, 1903) was an American lawyer and politician who served two non-consecutive terms as a U.S. representative from Ohio from 1863 to 1865 and from 1871 to 1873.

== Early life and career ==
Born near Piqua, Ohio, McKinney attended the country and private schools, the Piqua Academy, and the Ohio Wesleyan College, Delaware, Ohio. He studied law. He was admitted to the bar in 1850 and commenced practice in Piqua. He served as delegate to all the Democratic National Conventions from 1850 to 1888.

== Congress ==
McKinney was elected as a Democrat to the Thirty-eighth Congress (March 4, 1863 – March 3, 1865). He was an unsuccessful candidate in 1864 for reelection to the Thirty-ninth Congress.

McKinney was again elected to the Forty-second Congress (March 4, 1871 – March 3, 1873). He was not a candidate for renomination in 1872.

== Later career and death ==
He resumed the practice of law. He served as chairman of the Democratic State executive committee in 1879 and 1880. He died in Piqua, Ohio, June 13, 1903. He was interred in Forest Hill Cemetery.

In 1853 McKinney married Louisa Wood, who had seven children. He was a Freemason.

== Sources ==
- United States Congress. "John F. McKinney (id: M000525)". Biographical Directory of the United States Congress.

U.S. House of Representatives
Preceded by William Allen	Member of the U.S. House of Representatives from Ohio's 4th congressional district 1863-1865	Succeeded by William Lawrence
Preceded by William Lawrence	Member of the U.S. House of Representatives from Ohio's 4th congressional district 1871-1873	Succeeded by Lewis B. Gunckel
