= Ebbert =

The Ebbert family has produced several notable figures in the United States. In Colorado, the Ebberts were a politically active agricultural family in the Pueblo, Otero, and Montezuma County areas of Colorado in the late 19th and early 20th century. William B. Ebbert was the family patriarch, American Civil War veteran and served in the Colorado General Assembly. William was a second cousin of Congressman George Ebbert Seney (D-Ohio).

The Ebbert family were descendants of American Revolutionary War veterans, the Van Kirks. (Source: "Van Kirk Family History as told by historian," The Washington Record, August 23, 1913.)

== Congressman George Ebbert Seney connection ==
George Ebbert Seney (D-Ohio) was the cousin of John Van Kirk Ebbert, who was the father of Assembly Member William B. Ebbert (Colorado General Assembly).
For detailed biographical information on George Ebbert Seney and the Ebbert family, see History of Seneca County, Ohio, Illustrated. Chicago: Warner, Beers & Co, 1886. Online version available at heritagepursuit.com.

== Descendants ==
Of the nine children born to the family patriarch (William B. Ebbert), only one son (William Dickinson Ebbert) and two daughters (Edith Paxton Ebbert and Blanche Gould Ebbert) survived. William went on to own a feed store in Rocky Ford, Colorado before relocating to Twin Falls, Idaho. Blanche lived in Lewiston, Idaho and retired in Inglewood, California and Edith settled in Pueblo, Colorado. Blanche Gould Ebbert was a renowned composer, pianist, and musician in Brooklyn; she was a graduate of the Cincinnati Conservatory of Music and the National Conservatory of Music in Manhattan.

Since William Dickinson Ebbert's birth in 1876, each generation of Ebberts has produced one son to carry on the name: William Bevers Ebbert (1914–1997), Scott William Ebbert (1943–2001), and Brian Scott Ebbert (1969- ).

=== See also ===
- William B. Ebbert, Member of the Colorado General Assembly, 1889–90, 1907–08, 1911–12
- George Ebbert Seney, Member of the U.S. House of Representatives from Ohio, 1883–91
- History of Colorado, Volume 1, SJ Clarke Publishing Company, 1918, p. 887
- Montezuma County
- Montezuma Journal, November 24, 1910
- Cortez, Colorado
- Colorado General Assembly
- California (under "Further reading": "California's Legislature," Brian S. Ebbert, Chief Editor)

== Published works by Ebbert family members ==
- On Colorado's Fair Mesa's, by William B. Ebbert. Pueblo, CO: Mall Publishing Co., 1897. Ill, 58 pp.
- "Save Me, O God", musical composition (1899), Blanche Gould Ebbert Addington. See Pueblo Chieftain, December 24, 1899.
- California's Legislature (2006), by E. Dotson Wilson and Brian S. Ebbert.
- Seney's Ohio Code, by Judge/Congressman George Ebbert Seney.
- Pueblo Review and Standard, a Pueblo-area newspaper published and edited by William B. Ebbert circa 1890. (For information about the labor union conflict with the Review and Standard, see Fort Collins Courier, March 13, 1890, page 4. Click here to search historic newspapers online )
