= George E. Seney =

American politician

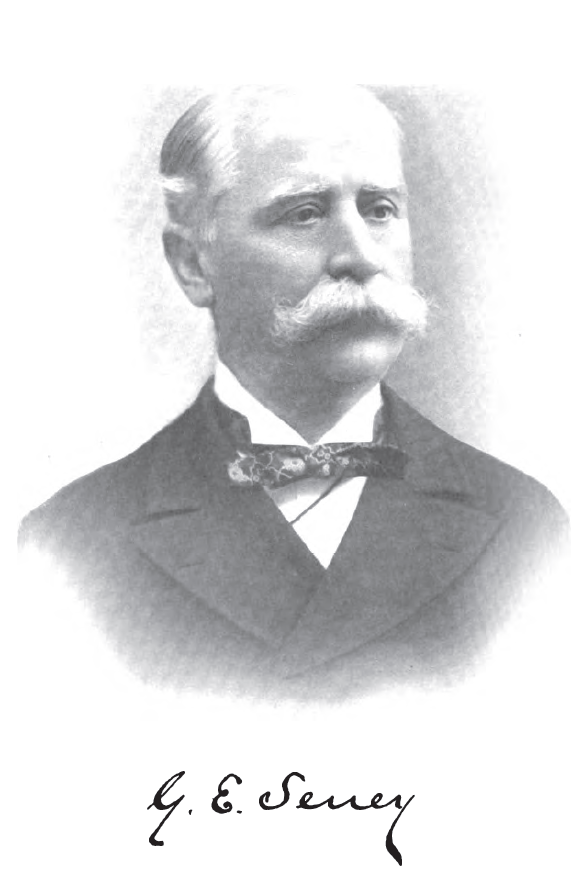
- circa 1902

Member of the U.S. House of Representatives from Ohio
- In office March 4, 1883 – March 3, 1891
- Preceded by: Benjamin Le Fevre
- Succeeded by: Fernando C. Layton
- Constituency: 5th district (1883-1885); 7th district (1885-1887); 5th district (1887-1891)

Personal details
- Born: George Ebbert Seney; May 29, 1832 Uniontown, Pennsylvania, U.S.
- Died: June 11, 1905 (aged 73) Tiffin, Ohio, U.S.
- Resting place: Greenlawn Cemetery, Tiffin
- Party: Democratic
- Spouse: Anna Walker
- Education: Norwalk Seminary

Military service
- Branch/service: (United States) Union Army
- Years of service: July 28, 1862: November 22, 1864
- Rank: First lieutenant
- Unit: 101st Ohio Infantry

George Ebbert Seney (May 29, 1832 – June 11, 1905) was a 19th-century politician, lawyer, and judge from Ohio. A Democrat, he served four terms in the United States House of Representatives from 1883 to 1891.

== Biography ==
=== Early life ===
Born in Uniontown, Pennsylvania, he was grandson of Joshua Seney, and was also descended from colonial Governor of Maryland Francis Nicholson. Seney moved to Tiffin, Ohio with his parents in 1832.

He attended Norwalk Seminary, studied law and was admitted to the bar in 1853, commencing practice in Tiffin. He declined appointment as United States Attorney for the Northern District of Ohio, tendered by President James Buchanan. He was a judge of the court of common pleas in 1857.

During the Civil War, enlisted in the 101st Ohio Infantry in 1862 where he was promoted to first lieutenant and later acted as quartermaster of the regiment until the close of the war.

=== Congress ===
He lost election to the United States House of Representatives in 1874 by fewer than 140 votes. Seney was a delegate to the Democratic National Convention in 1876 and was elected a Democrat to the United States House of Representatives in 1882, serving from 1883 to 1891, not being a candidate for renomination in 1890.

=== Later career and death ===
Afterwards, he resumed practicing law in Tiffin, Ohio until his death there on June 11, 1905. He was interred in Greenlawn Cemetery in Tiffin.

=== Family ===
Seney was married to Anna Walker, granddaughter of founder of Tiffin, Josiah Hedges. Judge Seney was a pallbearer for Chief Justice Morrison Waite.

William B. Ebbert. (Congressman George Ebbert Seney was the cousin of John Van Kirk Ebbert, Sgt., 1st Regiment, W. Va. Infantry Volunteers, Union Army. Congressman George Ebbert Seney was the great-uncle of William B. Ebbert, a member of the Colorado General Assembly from 1889 to 1890, 1907 to 1908, and 1911 to 1912.

U.S. House of Representatives
Preceded by Benjamin Le Fevre	Member of the U.S. House of Representatives from Ohio's 5th congressional district March 4, 1883 – March 3, 1885	Succeeded by Benjamin Le Fevre
Preceded by James E. Campbell	Member of the U.S. House of Representatives from Ohio's 7th congressional district March 4, 1885 – March 3, 1887	Succeeded by James E. Campbell
Preceded by Benjamin Le Fevre	Member of the U.S. House of Representatives from Ohio's 5th congressional district March 4, 1887 – March 3, 1891	Succeeded by Fernando C. Layton
