= William E. Tou Velle =

American politician

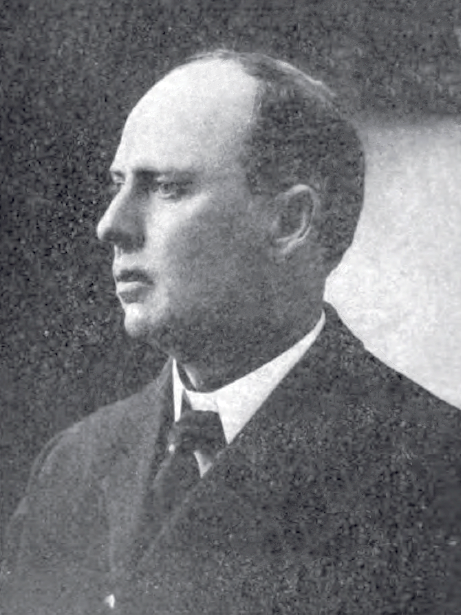

Member of the U.S. House of Representatives from Ohio's 4th district
- In office March 4, 1907 – March 3, 1911
- Preceded by: Harvey C. Garber
- Succeeded by: J. Henry Goeke

Personal details
- Born: William Ellsworth Tou Velle; November 23, 1862 Celina, Ohio, U.S.
- Died: August 14, 1951 (aged 88) Celina, Ohio, U.S.
- Resting place: North Grove Cemetery
- Party: Democratic
- Spouse: Elizabeth S. Day
- Education: Cincinnati Law School

William Ellsworth Tou Velle (November 23, 1862 – August 14, 1951) was an American lawyer and politician who served two terms as a U.S. representative from Ohio from 1907 to 1911.

== Biography ==
Born in Celina, Ohio, November 23, 1862, attended the public schools and was graduated from Celina High School in 1879, Tou Velle was appointed postmaster of Celina, Ohio, on May 27, 1885, and served until June 14, 1888, when a successor was appointed. He was graduated from Cincinnati Law School in 1889. He was admitted to the bar the same year and commenced practice in Celina.

=== Congress ===
Tou Velle was elected as a Democrat to the Sixtieth and Sixty-first Congresses (March 4, 1907 – March 3, 1911). He did not seek renomination in 1910.

=== Later career and death ===
He resumed the practice of law. He served as president of the First National Bank of Celina. He died in Celina, Ohio, August 14, 1951. He was interred in North Grove Cemetery.

== Sources ==
- United States Congress. "William E. Tou Velle (id: T000318)". Biographical Directory of the United States Congress.

U.S. House of Representatives
Preceded by Harvey C. Garber	Member of the U.S. House of Representatives from Ohio's 4th congressional district 1907-1911	Succeeded by J. Henry Goeke
