= William T. Fitzgerald =

American politician

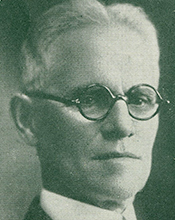

Member of the U.S. House of Representatives from Ohio's 4th district
- In office March 4, 1925 – March 3, 1929
- Preceded by: John L. Cable
- Succeeded by: John L. Cable

Personal details
- Born: William Thomas Fitzgerald; October 13, 1858 Greenville, Ohio, U.S.
- Died: January 12, 1939 (aged 80) Greenville, Ohio, U.S.
- Resting place: Greenville Cemetery
- Party: Republican
- Education: National Normal University; College of Wooster

William Thomas Fitzgerald (October 13, 1858 – January 12, 1939) was an American educator, physician, and politician who served two terms as a U.S. representative from Ohio from 1925 to 1929.

== Biography ==
Born in Greenville, Ohio, Fitzgerald attended the rural schools and the Greenville High School. He served as member of the National Guard of Ohio from 1875 to 1882, and saw service during the Newark riots in 1877. He graduated from the National Normal University, Lebanon, Ohio, in 1887. He taught in the Greenville High School from 1886 to 1889. He graduated from the medical department of the University of Wooster, Wooster, Ohio, in 1891 and commenced practice in Greenville in 1891.

He served as member of the board of education from 1906 to 1914. He served as mayor of Greenville from 1921to 1925.

=== Congress ===
Fitzgerald was elected as a Republican to the Sixty-ninth and Seventieth Congresses (March 4, 1925 – March 3, 1929). He served as chairman of the Committee on Revision of the Laws (Sixty-ninth Congress), Committee on Invalid Pensions (Seventieth Congress).

He was not a candidate for renomination in 1928 to the Seventy-first Congress.

=== Later career and death ===
He resumed the practice of medicine in Greenville, Ohio, where he died on January 12, 1939. He was interred in Greenville Cemetery.

== Sources ==
- United States Congress. "William T. Fitzgerald (id: F000170)". Biographical Directory of the United States Congress.

U.S. House of Representatives
Preceded by John L. Cable	Member of the U.S. House of Representatives from Ohio's 4th congressional district 1925-1929	Succeeded by John L. Cable
