= Charles Marley Anderson =

American politician (1845–1908)

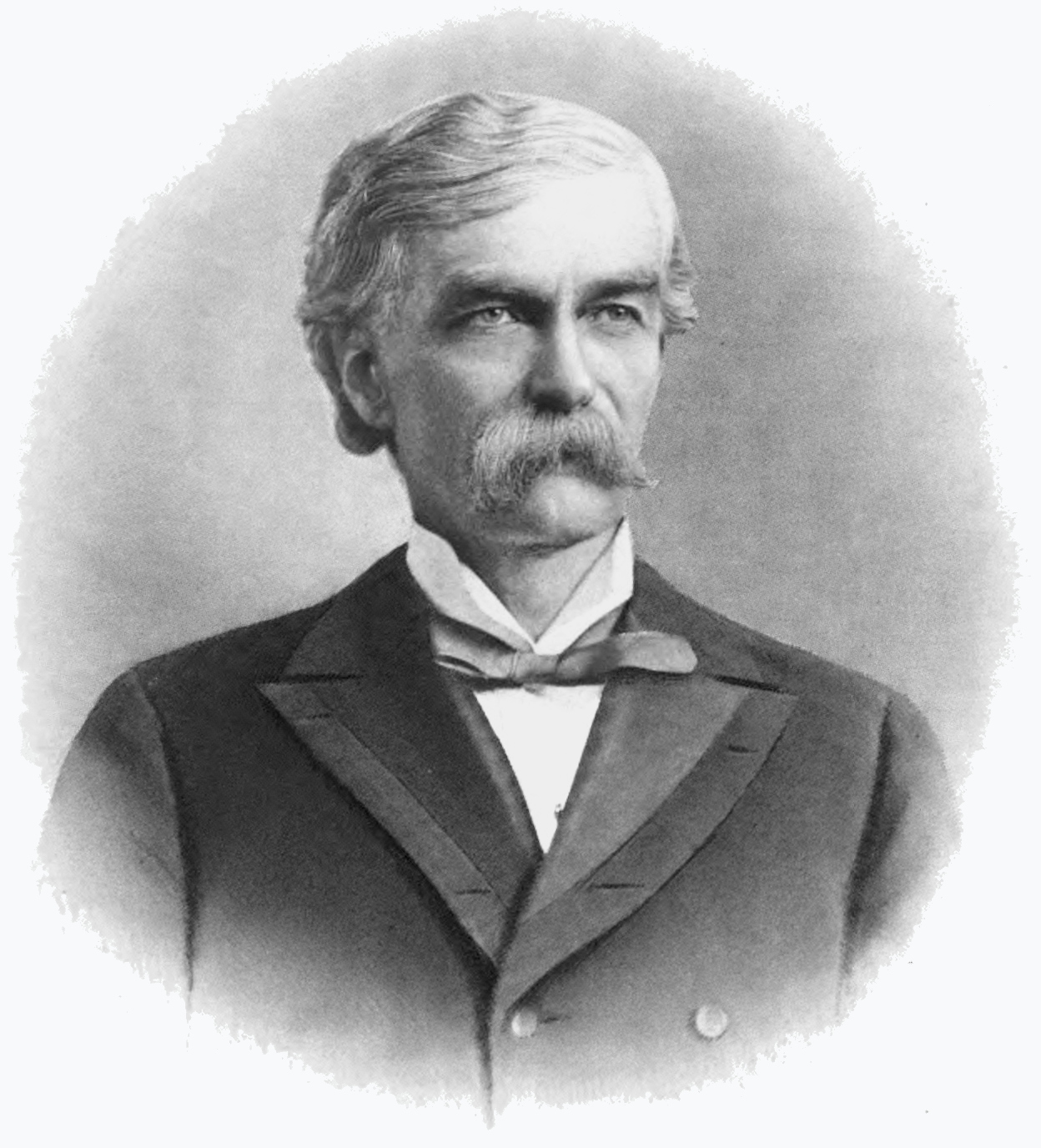

Member of the U.S. House of Representatives from Ohio's 4th district
- In office March 4, 1885 – March 3, 1887
- Preceded by: Benjamin Le Fevre
- Succeeded by: Samuel S. Yoder

Personal details
- Born: January 5, 1845 Mifflinburg, Pennsylvania, U.S.
- Died: December 28, 1908 (aged 63) Greenville, Ohio, U.S.
- Resting place: Greenville Cemetery
- Party: Democratic
- Spouse: Ella Hart
- Children: two
- Education: National Normal University
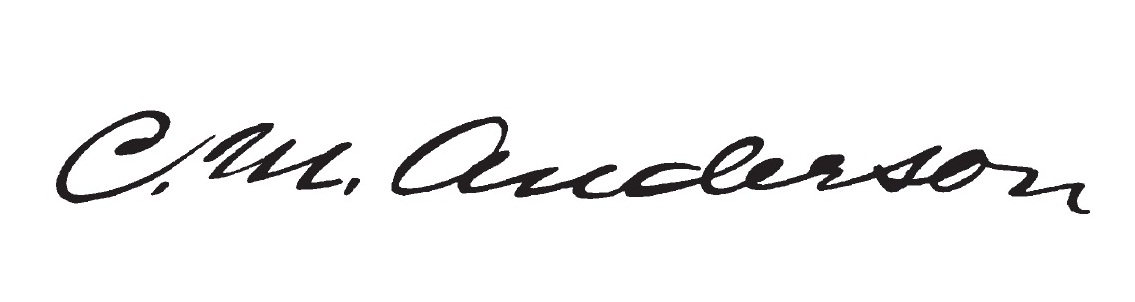
- Signature

Military service
- Allegiance: United States
- Branch/service: Union Army
- Years of service: 1861–1865
- Unit: 71st Ohio Infantry
- Battles/wars: American Civil War

Charles Marley Anderson (January 5, 1845 – December 28, 1908) was an American Civil War veteran and a United States representative from the fourth district of the U.S. state of Ohio. He served one term from 1885 to 1887.

== Early life and career ==
Charles Marley Anderson was born in Mifflinburg, Pennsylvania, in 1845, and moved with his parents to Darke County, Ohio, in 1855. Three of his four grandparents were born in Ireland.

He attended the common schools, and enlisted in Company B, 71st Ohio Infantry, in 1861 during the American Civil War. He served until honorably discharged in 1865. He attended the National Normal University in Lebanon, Ohio, in 1866, studied law, and commenced practice in Greenville, Ohio, in 1868.

== Congress ==
Anderson was elected as a Democrat to Ohio's 4th congressional district in 1884, and failed at re-nomination in 1886. He served March 4, 1885, to March 3, 1887. He was named by Governor James E. Campbell as an Ohio commissioner to the World's Columbian Exposition of 1892.

== Death ==
Anderson died at Greenville on December 28, 1908, and is buried at Greenville Cemetery.

Charles Marley Anderson married Ella Hart of Greenville on June 7, 1870. They had two sons. He was a member of the Improved Order of Red Men, Knights of Pythias, Masonic Order, and Grand Army of the Republic.

U.S. House of Representatives
Preceded by Benjamin LeFevre	U.S. Representative from Ohio's 4th Congressional District; 1885–1887	Succeeded by Samuel S. Yoder
