= J. Henry Goeke =

American politician (1869–1930)

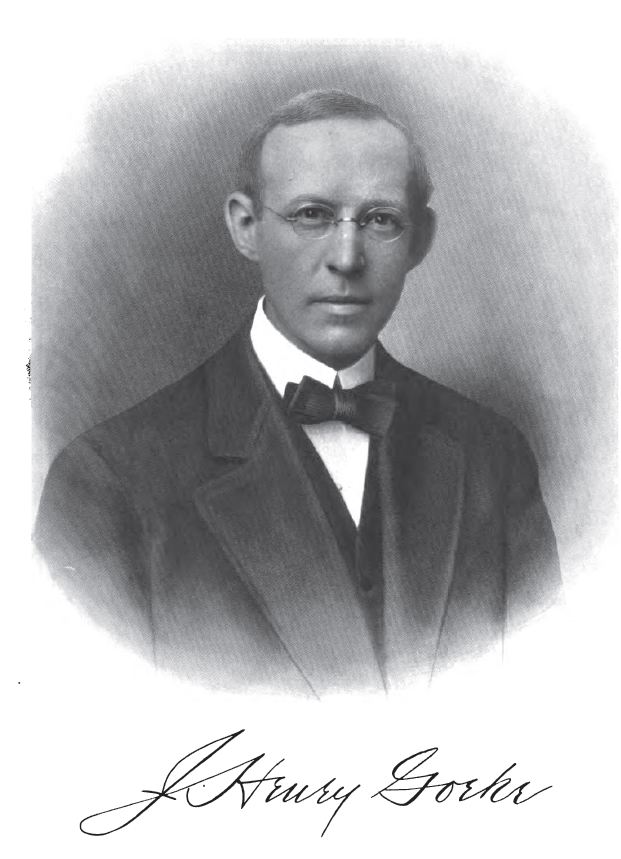

Member of the U.S. House of Representatives from Ohio's 4th district
- In office March 4, 1911 – March 3, 1915
- Preceded by: William E. Tou Velle
- Succeeded by: J. Edward Russell

Personal details
- Born: John Henry Goeke; October 28, 1869 Minster, Ohio, U.S.
- Died: March 25, 1930 (aged 60) Lima, Ohio, U.S.
- Resting place: Gethsemane Cemetery
- Party: Democratic
- Spouse(s): Emma Kolter; Catherine Nichols
- Children: four
- Education: Cincinnati Law School

John Henry Goeke (October 28, 1869 – March 25, 1930) was an American lawyer and politician who served two terms as a U.S. representative from Ohio for two terms from 1911 to 1915.

== Biography ==
Born near Minster, Ohio, Goeke attended the common schools and was graduated from Pio Nono College in St. Francis, Wisconsin, in 1888. He studied law at Cincinnati Law School and was graduated in 1891.

=== Early career ===
He was admitted to the bar in 1891 and commenced practice in St. Marys, Ohio. He was City solicitor of St. Marys from 1892 to 1894. He served as prosecuting attorney of Auglaize County from 1894 to 1900. He resumed the practice of law in Wapakoneta, Ohio, in 1900. He also served as a director of several banks and manufacturing concerns. He served as chairman of the Democratic State convention in 1903.

=== Congress ===
Goeke was elected as a Democrat to the Sixty-second and Sixty-third Congresses (March 4, 1911 – March 3, 1915). He was an unsuccessful candidate for renomination in 1914 to the Sixty-fourth Congress.

=== Later career ===
He served as delegate to the Democratic National Conventions in 1912, 1920, 1924, and 1928. He resumed the practice of law in Wapakoneta, Ohio. He moved to Lima, Ohio, in 1921 and continued the practice of law.

=== Death and burial ===
He died in Lima, Ohio, March 25, 1930. He was interred in Gethsemane Cemetery.

=== Personal life ===
In November 1891, Goeke was married to Emma Kolter of Wapakoneta. They had two children. She and the children were accidentally asphyxiated by natural gas at home while Goeke was away.

In September, 1907, Goeke married Catherine Nichols. They had two daughters.

== External sources ==
- United States Congress. "J. Henry Goeke (id: G000252)". Biographical Directory of the United States Congress.
- J. Henry Goeke at Find a Grave

U.S. House of Representatives
Preceded by William E. Tou Velle	Member of the U.S. House of Representatives from Ohio's 4th congressional district 1911-1915	Succeeded by J. Edward Russell
