= Fernando C. Layton =

American politician

Fernando Layton
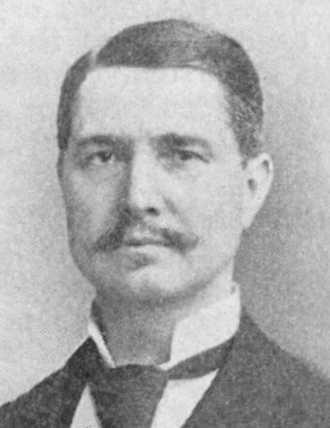

Member of the U.S. House of Representatives from Ohio
- In office March 4, 1891 – March 3, 1897
- Preceded by: George E. Seney
- Succeeded by: George A. Marshall
- Constituency: 5th district (1891–1893); 4th district (1893–1897)

Personal details
- Born: Fernando Coello Layton; April 11, 1847 Auglaize County, Ohio, U.S.
- Died: June 22, 1926 (aged 79) Wapakoneta, Ohio, U.S.
- Resting place: Greenlawn Cemetery
- Party: Democratic
- Education: Wittenberg College

Fernando Coello Layton (April 11, 1847 – June 22, 1926) was an American lawyer and politician who served three terms as a U.S. representative from Ohio for three terms from 1891 to 1897.

== Early life and career ==
Born near St. Johns, Auglaize County, Ohio, Layton attended the public schools and Wittenberg College, Springfield, Ohio. He studied law. He was admitted to the bar in 1869 and practiced in Wapakoneta, Ohio. County school examiner. He served as prosecuting attorney of Auglaize County 1875-1878. He served as captain of Company G, Ohio National Guard from 1878 to 1883.

== Congress ==
Layton was elected as a Democrat to the Fifty-second, Fifty-third, and Fifty-fourth Congresses (March 4, 1891 – March 3, 1897). He was not a candidate for renomination in 1896.

== Later career ==
He resumed the practice of his profession in Wapakoneta, Ohio.

Layton was elected Common Pleas Judge in 1908. He was reelected in 1914 and in 1920 and served until his resignation on June 9, 1926.

== Death ==
He died in Wapakoneta, Ohio, on June 22, 1926. He was interred in Greenlawn Cemetery.

U.S. House of Representatives
Preceded by George E. Seney	Member of the U.S. House of Representatives from Ohio's 5th congressional district 1891-1893	Succeeded by Dennis D. Donovan
Preceded by Martin K. Gantz	Member of the U.S. House of Representatives from Ohio's 4th congressional district 1893-1897	Succeeded by George A. Marshall
