= George Philip Hahn =

American judge

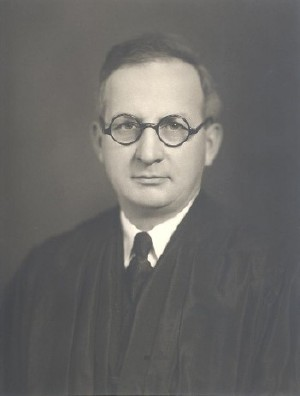

Judge of the United States District Court for the Northern District of Ohio
- In office December 17, 1928 – February 12, 1937
- Appointed by: Calvin Coolidge
- Preceded by: John Milton Killits
- Succeeded by: Frank Le Blond Kloeb

Personal details
- Born: George Philip Hahn; June 26, 1879 Napoleon, Ohio, U.S.
- Died: February 12, 1937 (aged 57)
- Party: Republican
- Education: Ohio State University Moritz College of Law (LL.B.)

George Philip Hahn (June 26, 1879 – February 12, 1937) was a United States district judge of the United States District Court for the Northern District of Ohio.

== Education and career ==
Born in Napoleon, Ohio, Hahn received a Bachelor of Laws from the Ohio State University Moritz College of Law in 1905. He was in private practice in Toledo, Ohio from 1905 to 1928.

== Federal judicial service ==
On December 6, 1928, Hahn was nominated by President Calvin Coolidge to a seat on the United States District Court for the Northern District of Ohio vacated by Judge John Milton Killits. Hahn was confirmed by the United States Senate on December 17, 1928, and received his commission the same day. He served in that capacity until his death on February 12, 1937.

== Memberships ==
Hahn was a director of the University of Toledo, which conferred upon him the honorary degree Doctor of Laws. He was President of the Toledo Bar Association, member of the Ohio and American Bar Associations, a Lutheran Church member, Republican and in the BPOE.

== Personal ==
Hahn married Stella Vocke of Napoleon on November 14, 1906, and had one son and one daughter.

== Sources ==
Legal offices
Preceded by John Milton Killits	Judge of the United States District Court for the Northern District of Ohio; 1928–1937	Succeeded by Frank Le Blond Kloeb
