= Hill Grove, Ohio =

Unincorporated community in Ohio, U.S.

Coordinates: 40°10′39″N 84°46′06″W

Hill Grove is an unincorporated community in Darke County, in the U.S. state of Ohio.

== History ==
Hill Grove was laid out in 1848. A post office called Hill Grove was established in 1837, and remained in operation until 1917. Being close to Union City limited the community's early growth.

== Notable person ==
Harvey C. Garber, U.S. Representative from Ohio
