= Lewis B. Gunckel =

American politician (1826–1903)

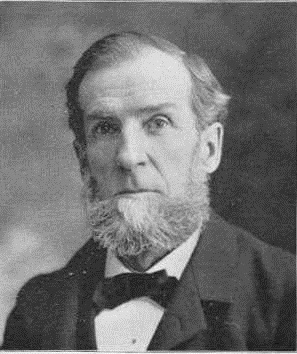

Member of the U.S. House of Representatives from Ohio's 4th district
- In office March 4, 1873 – March 3, 1875
- Preceded by: John F. McKinney
- Succeeded by: John A. McMahon

Member of the Ohio Senate from the 3rd district
- In office January 6, 1862 – December 31, 1865
- Preceded by: Fletcher T. Cuppy
- Succeeded by: Andrew L. Harris

Personal details
- Born: October 15, 1826 Germantown, Ohio, U.S.
- Died: October 3, 1903 (aged 76) Dayton, Ohio, U.S.
- Resting place: Woodland Cemetery
- Party: Republican
- Spouse: Catharine Winters
- Children: four
- Education: Miami University; Cincinnati Law School

Lewis B. Gunckel (October 15, 1826 – October 3, 1903) was an attorney, politician, advocate for Civil War disabled soldiers and their families, commissioner and a member of the United States House of Representatives from Ohio.

== Heritage and early life ==
Lewis Gunckel was born in Germantown, Ohio, a village originally laid out and founded by his paternal grandfather in 1805. Lewis was the son of Michael and Barbara (Shuey) Gunckel. Michael Gunckel served in the War of 1812 in active service and rose to the rank of colonel. He afterward represented his county in the Ohio legislature.

Lewis' paternal grandfather, Philip Gunckel, was elected in 1806 to represent Montgomery County in the Ohio General Assembly and elected again in 1808 to represent Montgomery and Preble counties at the Assembly. In 1816, the grandfather was appointed by the General Assembly to be associate judge of the Circuit Court for Montgomery County, in which capacity he served for fifteen years. Lewis Gunckel's maternal great-grandfather, John Martin Shuey's father, was elected to represent the Lancaster County, Pennsylvania Committee of Inspection to cooperate with the Continental Congress in the years preparatory to the American Revolution, although he died before the Declaration of Independence was signed.

In 1860, Lewis B. Gunckel married Catharine Winters, a daughter of Valentine Winters, a prominent capitalist and banker of Dayton, Ohio. They had four children — Winters, Katharine, Lewis W., and Percy, the second and third of whom survived to adulthood.

== Education and early legal career ==
Gunckel pursued preparatory studies in the local schools, attended Miami University and was graduated from Farmer's College at College Hill in Cincinnati, Ohio, in 1848. He decided to prepare for the legal profession, and after graduation read law in Dayton, and subsequently entered the Cincinnati Law School where he was graduated in 1851.

Gunckel was admitted to the Ohio bar in 1851 and commenced practice in Dayton. He was joined in the practice in 1853 by Hiram Strong who remained his partner until Strong was killed in the Civil War nine years later. Edward L. Rowe joined Gunckel in 1869 and the firm became Gunckel & Rowe. Over the years the name became Gunckel, Rowe & Gunckel, Gunckel, Rowe & Shuey. One of his associates was John A. McMahon with whom he sparred politically. The firm has continuously existed from 1853 down to the present under a variety of names as additional partners became active or retired from the firm and is one of the oldest law firms in Ohio.

== Public service ==
Upon attaining his majority in 1847, Gunckel joined the Whig party. At its dissolution, he refused to join in the Know-Nothing movement, but upon the organization of the Republican party he at once transferred his allegiance to it, being one of the first local members. He presided and spoke at the first Montgomery county Republican meeting and was a delegate to the first Republican National Convention, which nominated John C. Frémont. In 1864, he was a Republican presidential elector and canvassed Ohio for Abraham Lincoln.

=== Ohio legislature ===
In 1862 he was elected to the Ohio Senate and for four years was one of its leaders as chairman of the judiciary committee. A stalwart Union man during the Civil War, he was a supporter of the policies of Lincoln. He led enactment of measures to aid prosecution of the war and to protect the families of soldiers. When his bill for soldiers' families relief was assailed — its constitutionality questioned and a plea of economy urged — Gunckel replied:

We can economize elsewhere, retrench everywhere, and save enough to the state in its local and general expenses to make up the entire sum; but if not, we should bear it cheerfully, heroically. We must fight or pay; we ought to do both.

He authored the bill granting to Ohio soldiers in the field the right to vote—a right which many thousands of them exercised. He introduced a bill that established a State of Ohio soldiers' home for returning veterans and after his senate service was appointed by the Governor as its manager.

The gradual disappearance of state hospitals and soldiers' retreats resulted in the creation of more substantial national homes. An act of Congress was approved March 31, 1865, appointing a Board of Managers of the National Homes for Disabled Volunteer Soldiers. The board elected General Benjamin F. Butler President, and Lewis B. Gunckel Secretary. The act authorized the Board to establish one or more homes, and under it four Homes were created. Gunckel was influential in the measures taken to establish the National Soldiers' Home (Central Home) in Dayton. The organization of the Central Home as an institution dates from March 26, 1867, at which date Gunckel, Resident Manager, took formal charge of the disabled soldiers then at the Home, a role he would continue for the next decade. The people of Dayton regarded this as his greatest and best work.

In the selection of a site for the Central Home, the Board of Managers looked at the rich and fertile Miami Valley, and entered into negotiations for the purchase of 540 acres (2.2 km^{2}) of land, about three miles (5 km) west of the city of Dayton. The cost of this site was $46,800 of which $20,000 was a donation from the citizens of Dayton under the leadership of Gunckel. Congress had given to the Home the lumber from temporary buildings at Camp Chase, and under Gunckel's direction buildings were rapidly and economically constructed and filled with disabled soldiers as fast as they were made ready.

=== Grant administration ===
In 1871, Ulysses S. Grant's Secretary of the Interior appointed Gunckel special commissioner to investigate frauds upon the Cherokee, Creek and Chickasaw Indians. His subsequent report led not only to the detection and punishment of the guilty parties, but to important reforms in the Indian service.

=== Congress ===
In 1872, Gunckel was elected to the Forty-third United States Congress from Ohio's 4th congressional district. He served on the military committee, became conspicuous in the House by his relentless opposition to public corruption and organized raids on the national treasury. He voted to repeal the bill known as the "salary grab," and always refused to accept the salary due him under the retroactive clause of that law. He was a frequent speaker, both on the floor of the House and in public meetings, on the need for cheap transportation. In 1874, Gunckel was unanimously nominated by his party for re-election, but the country was suffering from the financial Panic of 1873 and was torn by the temperance movement. These brought about a political revolution in Ohio and resulted in the election of Democrat John A. McMahon, Gunckel's law partner. Gunckel was nominated again in 1884, but declined to run.

== Return to legal practice ==
After serving in Congress, Gunckel returned to Dayton and continued his practice of law. It was said that "he has the courage to fight for a principle and the persistence to continue the fight to the last ditch; but he has learned by experience and observation that compromise is often better than litigation; that higher courage is sometimes displayed by him who conciliates than by him who fights. The greatest lawyer is understood to be the one who protects the interest of his client without litigation. It requires tact and skill and superior ability to gain the ends aimed at by diplomacy." He was known as "the peacemaker of the Dayton bar."

He was a delegate from the Ohio state bar to the newly formed National Bar Association from 1888 to 1890, also serving as treasurer and member of the executive committee of the latter. In the later years of his life, Gunckel was President of the Dayton Public Savings Bank.

== Death and burial ==
Gunckel died of pneumonia and heart trouble in Dayton and is interred in Woodland Cemetery and Arboretum.

U.S. House of Representatives
Preceded by John F. McKinney	Member of the U.S. House of Representatives from Ohio's 4th congressional district 1873–1875	Succeeded by John A. McMahon
