= Ohio's 4th congressional district =

U.S. House district for Ohio

Coordinates: 40°30′N 83°58′W

- Interactive map of district boundaries
- Representative: Jim Jordan; R–Urbana
- Distribution: 63.02% urban; 36.98% rural
- Population (2025): 823,580
- Median household income: $80,665
- Ethnicity: 85.1% White; 4.8% Black; 4.0% Two or more races; 3.0% Asian; 2.5% Hispanic; 0.5% other
- Cook PVI: R+18

Ohio's 4th congressional district spans sections of the central part of the state. It is currently represented by Republican Jim Jordan, the current chair of the House Judiciary Committee, who has represented the district since 2007.

As part of the 2010 redistricting process, it was redrawn from the previous district to stretch from Lima, to include the northwestern suburbs of Columbus, up to Tiffin and Elyria.

In May 2019, a panel of three federal judges ruled that Ohio's congressional district map was unconstitutional and based on gerrymandering. A new map was expected ahead of the 2020 election. However, after the U.S. Supreme Court ruled in Rucho v. Common Cause that courts could not review allegations of gerrymandering, the district boundaries would not change until congressional district maps were redrawn in 2022.

== Composition ==
For the 118th and successive Congresses (based on redistricting following the 2020 census), the district contains all or portions of the following counties, townships, and municipalities:

Allen County (21)

All 21 townships and municipalities

Ashland County (24)

All 24 townships and municipalities

Auglaize County (22)

All 22 townships and municipalities

Champaign County (19)

All 19 townships and municipalities

Delaware County (21)

Ashley, Berlin Township, Brown Township, Columbus (part; also 3rd, 12th, and 15th; shared with Fairfield and Franklin counties), Concord Township, Delaware, Delaware Township, Dublin (shared with Union County), Liberty Township, Marlboro Township, Orange Township, Ostrander, Oxford Township, Powell, Radnor Township, Scioto Township, Shawnee Hills, Thompson Township, Troy Township, Washington Township, Westerville (part; also 3rd; shared with Franklin County)

Hardin County (24)

All 24 townships and municipalities

Logan County (30)

All 30 townships and municipalities

Marion County (23)

All 23 townships and municipalities

Morrow County (24)

All 24 townships and municipalities

Richland County (29)

All 29 townships and municipalities

Shelby County (13)

Anna, Botkins, Dinsmore Township, Fort Loramie, Franklin Township, Jackson Township, Jackson Center, Kettlersville, McLean Township, Port Jefferson, Salem Township, Turtle Creek Township (part; also 15th), Van Buren Township

Union County (21)

All 21 townships and municipalities

Wyandot County (4)

Jackson Township, Kirby, Marseilles, Marseilles Township

== Recent election results from statewide races ==
=== 2023-2027 boundaries ===
Year	Office	Results
2008	President	McCain 59% - 38%
2012	President	Romney 63% - 37%
2016	President	Trump 66% - 29%
2016	Senate	Portman 71% - 24%
2018	Senate	Renacci 60% - 40%
2018	Governor	DeWine 65% - 32%
2018	Secretary of State	LaRose 65% - 32%
2018	Treasurer	Sprague 68% - 32%
2018	Auditor	Faber 65% - 32%
2018	Attorney General	Yost 68% - 32%
2020	President	Trump 67% - 31%
2022	Senate	Vance 67% - 33%
2022	Governor	DeWine 74% - 26%
2022	Secretary of State	LaRose 72% - 27%
2022	Treasurer	Sprague 71% - 29%
2022	Auditor	Faber 72% - 28%
2022	Attorney General	Yost 73% - 27%
2024	President	Trump 68% - 31%
2024	Senate	Moreno 62% - 34%

=== 2027–2033 boundaries ===
Year	Office	Results
2008	President	McCain 59% - 39%
2012	President	Romney 62% - 38%
2016	President	Trump 68% - 28%
2016	Senate	Portman 72% - 23%
2018	Senate	Renacci 61% - 39%
2018	Governor	DeWine 66% - 31%
2018	Attorney General	Yost 69% - 31%
2020	President	Trump 69% - 29%
2022	Senate	Vance 69% - 31%
2022	Governor	DeWine 77% - 23%
2022	Secretary of State	LaRose 74% - 25%
2022	Treasurer	Sprague 74% - 26%
2022	Auditor	Faber 75% - 25%
2022	Attorney General	Yost 76% - 24%
2024	President	Trump 71% - 28%
2024	Senate	Moreno 65% - 31%

== List of members representing the district ==
Member	Party	Year(s)	Cong ress	Electoral history	Counties represented
District established March 4, 1813
James Caldwell (St. Clairsville)	Democratic-Republican	March 4, 1813 – March 3, 1817	13th 14th	Elected in 1812. Re-elected in 1814. Retired.	
Samuel Herrick (Zanesville)	Democratic-Republican	March 4, 1817 – March 3, 1821	15th 16th	Elected in 1816. Re-elected in 1818. Retired.	
Vacant		March 4, 1821 – October 9, 1821	17th	Elected in 1820. Representative-elect John C. Wright resigned before beginning of term.	
David Chambers (Zanesville)	Democratic-Republican	October 9, 1821 – March 3, 1823	17th	Elected to finish Wright's term. Retired.	
Joseph Vance (Urbana)	Adams-Clay; Democratic-Republican	March 4, 1823 – March 3, 1825	18th 19th 20th 21st 22nd	Redistricted from the 5th district and re-elected in 1822. Re-elected in 1824. Re-elected in 1826. Re-elected in 1828. Re-elected in 1830. Redistricted to the 10th district.	
Joseph Vance (Urbana)	Anti-Jacksonian	March 4, 1825 – March 3, 1833	18th 19th 20th 21st 22nd	Redistricted from the 5th district and re-elected in 1822. Re-elected in 1824. Re-elected in 1826. Re-elected in 1828. Re-elected in 1830. Redistricted to the 10th district.	
Thomas Corwin (Lebanon)	Anti-Jacksonian	March 4, 1833 – March 3, 1837	23rd 24th 25th 26th	Redistricted from the 2nd district and re-elected in 1832. Re-elected in 1834. Re-elected in 1836. Re-elected in 1838. Resigned when nominated Governor of Ohio.	
Thomas Corwin (Lebanon)	Whig	March 4, 1837 – May 30, 1840	23rd 24th 25th 26th	Redistricted from the 2nd district and re-elected in 1832. Re-elected in 1834. Re-elected in 1836. Re-elected in 1838. Resigned when nominated Governor of Ohio.	
Vacant		May 30, 1840 – October 13, 1840	26th		
Jeremiah Morrow (Twenty Mile Stand)	Whig	October 13, 1840 – March 3, 1843	26th 27th	Elected to finish Corwin's term. Also elected to the next term in 1840. Retired.	
Joseph Vance (Urbana)	Whig	March 4, 1843 – March 3, 1847	28th 29th	Elected in 1843. Re-elected in 1844. Retired.	
Richard S. Canby (Bellefontaine)	Whig	March 4, 1847 – March 3, 1849	30th	Elected in 1846. [data missing]	
Moses Bledso Corwin (Urbana)	Whig	March 4, 1849 – March 3, 1851	31st	Elected in 1848. [data missing]	
Benjamin Stanton (Bellefontaine)	Whig	March 4, 1851 – March 3, 1853	32nd	Elected in 1850. [data missing]	
Matthias H. Nichols (Lima)	Democratic	March 4, 1853 – March 3, 1855	33rd 34th 35th	Elected in 1852. Re-elected in 1854. Re-elected in 1856. Lost re-election.	
Matthias H. Nichols (Lima)	Anti-Nebraska	March 4, 1855 – March 3, 1857	33rd 34th 35th	Elected in 1852. Re-elected in 1854. Re-elected in 1856. Lost re-election.	
Matthias H. Nichols (Lima)	Republican	March 4, 1857 – March 3, 1859	33rd 34th 35th	Elected in 1852. Re-elected in 1854. Re-elected in 1856. Lost re-election.	
William Allen (Greenville)	Democratic	March 4, 1859 – March 3, 1863	36th 37th	Elected in 1858. Re-elected in 1860. Retired.	
John F. McKinney (Piqua)	Democratic	March 4, 1863 – March 3, 1865	38th	Elected in 1862. Lost re-election.	
William Lawrence (Bellefontaine)	Republican	March 4, 1865 – March 3, 1871	39th 40th 41st	Elected in 1864. Re-elected in 1866. Re-elected in 1868. Lost re-election.	
John F. McKinney (Piqua)	Democratic	March 4, 1871 – March 3, 1873	42nd	Again elected in 1870. Retired.	
Lewis B. Gunckel (Dayton)	Republican	March 4, 1873 – March 3, 1875	43rd	Elected in 1872. Lost re-election.	
John A. McMahon (Dayton)	Democratic	March 4, 1875 – March 3, 1879	44th 45th	Elected in 1874. Re-elected in 1876. Redistricted to the 3rd district.	
J. Warren Keifer (Springfield)	Republican	March 4, 1879 – March 3, 1881	46th	Redistricted from the 8th district and Re-elected in 1878. Redistricted to the 8th district.	
Emanuel Shultz (Dayton)	Republican	March 4, 1881 – March 3, 1883	47th	Elected in 1880. [data missing]	
Benjamin Le Fevre (Maplewood)	Democratic	March 4, 1883 – March 3, 1885	48th	Redistricted from the 5th district and re-elected in 1882. Redistricted to the 5th district.	
Charles Marley Anderson (Greenville)	Democratic	March 4, 1885 – March 3, 1887	49th	Elected in 1884. [data missing]	
Samuel S. Yoder (Lima)	Democratic	March 4, 1887 – March 3, 1891	50th 51st	Elected in 1886. Re-elected in 1888. [data missing]	
Martin K. Gantz (Troy)	Democratic	March 4, 1891 – March 3, 1893	52nd	Elected in 1890. [data missing]	
Fernando C. Layton (Wapakoneta)	Democratic	March 4, 1893 – March 3, 1897	53rd 54th	Redistricted from the 5th district and re-elected in 1892. Re-elected in 1894. [data missing]	
George A. Marshall (Sidney)	Democratic	March 4, 1897 – March 3, 1899	55th	Elected in 1896. [data missing]	
Robert B. Gordon (St. Marys)	Democratic	March 4, 1899 – March 3, 1903	56th 57th	Elected in 1898. Re-elected in 1900. [data missing]	
Harvey C. Garber (Greenville)	Democratic	March 4, 1903 – March 3, 1907	58th 59th	Elected in 1902. Re-elected in 1904. [data missing]	
William E. Tou Velle (Celina)	Democratic	March 4, 1907 – March 3, 1911	60th 61st	Elected in 1906. Re-elected in 1908. [data missing]	
J. Henry Goeke (Wapakoneta)	Democratic	March 4, 1911 – March 3, 1915	62nd 63rd	Elected in 1910. Re-elected in 1912. [data missing]	
J. Edward Russell (Sidney)	Republican	March 4, 1915 – March 3, 1917	64th	Elected in 1914. [data missing]	
Benjamin F. Welty (Lima)	Democratic	March 4, 1917 – March 3, 1921	65th 66th	Elected in 1916. Re-elected in 1918. Lost re-election.	
John L. Cable (Lima)	Republican	March 4, 1921 – March 3, 1925	67th 68th	Elected in 1920. Re-elected in 1922. Retired.	
William T. Fitzgerald (Greenville)	Republican	March 4, 1925 – March 3, 1929	69th 70th	Elected in 1924. Re-elected in 1926. Retired.	
John L. Cable (Lima)	Republican	March 4, 1929 – March 3, 1933	71st 72nd	Elected in 1928. Re-elected in 1930. Lost re-election.	
Frank Le Blond Kloeb (Celina)	Democratic	March 4, 1933 – August 19, 1937	73rd 74th 75th	Elected in 1932. Re-elected in 1934. Re-elected in 1936. Resigned when appointed judge of the U.S. District Court for the Northern District of Ohio.	
Vacant		August 19, 1937 – November 8, 1938	75th		
Walter H. Albaugh (Troy)	Republican	November 8, 1938 – January 3, 1939	75th	Elected to finish Kloeb's term. Was not a candidate for the next term.	
Robert Franklin Jones (Lima)	Republican	January 3, 1939 – September 2, 1947	76th 77th 78th 79th 80th	Elected in 1938. Re-elected in 1940. Re-elected in 1942. Re-elected in 1944. Re-elected in 1946. Resigned when appointed a member of the Federal Communications Commission.	
Vacant		September 2, 1947 – November 4, 1947	80th		
William Moore McCulloch (Piqua)	Republican	November 4, 1947 – January 3, 1973	80th 81st 82nd 83rd 84th 85th 86th 87th 88th 89th 90th 91st 92nd	Elected to finish Jones's term. Re-elected in 1948. Re-elected in 1950. Re-elected in 1952. Re-elected in 1954. Re-elected in 1956. Re-elected in 1958. Re-elected in 1960. Re-elected in 1962. Re-elected in 1964. Re-elected in 1966. Re-elected in 1968. Re-elected in 1970. Retired.	
Tennyson Guyer (Findlay)	Republican	January 3, 1973 – April 12, 1981	93rd 94th 95th 96th 97th	Elected in 1972. Re-elected in 1974. Re-elected in 1976. Re-elected in 1978. Re-elected in 1980. Died.	
Vacant		April 12, 1981 – June 25, 1981	97th		
Mike Oxley (Findlay)	Republican	June 25, 1981 – January 3, 2007	97th 98th 99th 100th 101st 102nd 103rd 104th 105th 106th 107th 108th 109th	Elected to finish Guyer's term. Re-elected in 1982. Re-elected in 1984. Re-elected in 1986. Re-elected in 1988. Re-elected in 1990. Re-elected in 1992. Re-elected in 1994. Re-elected in 1996. Re-elected in 1998. Re-elected in 2000. Re-elected in 2002. Re-elected in 2004. Retired.	
Mike Oxley (Findlay)	Republican	June 25, 1981 – January 3, 2007	97th 98th 99th 100th 101st 102nd 103rd 104th 105th 106th 107th 108th 109th	Elected to finish Guyer's term. Re-elected in 1982. Re-elected in 1984. Re-elected in 1986. Re-elected in 1988. Re-elected in 1990. Re-elected in 1992. Re-elected in 1994. Re-elected in 1996. Re-elected in 1998. Re-elected in 2000. Re-elected in 2002. Re-elected in 2004. Retired.	2003–2013
Jim Jordan (Urbana)	Republican	January 3, 2007 – present	110th 111th 112th 113th 114th 115th 116th 117th 118th 119th	Elected in 2006. Re-elected in 2008. Re-elected in 2010. Re-elected in 2012. Re-elected in 2014. Re-elected in 2016. Re-elected in 2018. Re-elected in 2020. Re-elected in 2022. Re-elected in 2024. Re-elected in 2026.	2003–2013
Jim Jordan (Urbana)	Republican	January 3, 2007 – present	110th 111th 112th 113th 114th 115th 116th 117th 118th 119th	Elected in 2006. Re-elected in 2008. Re-elected in 2010. Re-elected in 2012. Re-elected in 2014. Re-elected in 2016. Re-elected in 2018. Re-elected in 2020. Re-elected in 2022. Re-elected in 2024. Re-elected in 2026.	2013–2023
Jim Jordan (Urbana)	Republican	January 3, 2007 – present	110th 111th 112th 113th 114th 115th 116th 117th 118th 119th	Elected in 2006. Re-elected in 2008. Re-elected in 2010. Re-elected in 2012. Re-elected in 2014. Re-elected in 2016. Re-elected in 2018. Re-elected in 2020. Re-elected in 2022. Re-elected in 2024. Re-elected in 2026.	2023–2027

== Recent election results ==
Year	Democratic	Republican	Other(s)
1910	√ J. Henry Goeke: 20,865	C. E. Johnston: 13,482	Arthur A. Hensch: 1,403
1912	√ J. Henry Goeke (inc.): 21,512	John L. Cable: 10,267	William E. Rudy: 4,993; Scott Williams: 2,132; W. Rollo Boehringer: 1,091
1914	N. W. Cunningham: 24,114	√ J. Edward Russell: 25,069	Samuel L. Newman: 1,737; C. C. Hobart: 1,400
1916	√ Benjamin F. Welty: 29,486	J. Edward Russell (inc.): 25,378	
1918	√ Benjamin F. Welty (inc.): 22,580	J. Edward Russell: 22,136	
1920	Benjamin F. Welty (inc.): 45,489	√ John L. Cable: 50,576	
1922	J. Henry Goeke: 35,916	√ John L. Cable (inc.): 43,251	
1924	Hugh T. Mathers: 42,652	√ William T. Fitzgerald: 43,984	
1926	Benjamin F. Welty: 31,293	√ William T. Fitzgerald (inc.): 32,236	
1928	William Klinger: 41,677	√ John L. Cable: 56,291	
1930	Gainor Jennings: 37,673	√ John L. Cable (inc.): 43,104	
1932	√ Frank L. Kloeb: 59,003	John L. Cable (inc.): 49,100	
1934	√ Frank L. Kloeb (inc.): 48,613	Guy D. Hawley: 41,504	
1936	√ Frank L. Kloeb (inc.): 61,927	Robert W. Yurner: 53,352	
1938 (Special)	[data missing]	√ Walter H. Albaugh: [data missing]	[data missing]
1938	[ William B. Swonger: 33,284	√ Robert Franklin Jones: 56,399	John C. Fisher: 4,616
1940	Clarence C. Miller: 47,765	√ Robert Franklin Jones (inc.): 65,534	
1942	Clarence C. Miller: 22,567	√ Robert Franklin Jones (inc.): 39,275	
1944	Earl Ludwig: 42,983	√ Robert Franklin Jones (inc.): 67,829	
1946	Merl J. Bragg: 32,160	√ Robert Franklin Jones (inc.): 64,718	
1947 (Special)	[data missing]	√ William M. McCulloch: [data missing]	[data missing]
1948	Earl Ludwig: 45,534	√ William M. McCulloch (inc.): 57,321	
1950	Carleton Carl Reiser: 32,686	√ William M. McCulloch (inc.): 65,640	
1952	Carleton Carl Reiser: 43,426	√ William M. McCulloch (inc.): 93,442	
1954	Forrest L. Blankenship: 32,474	√ William M. McCulloch (inc.): 67,762	
1956	Ortha O. Barr Jr.: 42,416	√ William M. McCulloch (inc.): 93,607	
1958	Marjorie Conrad Struns: 46,933	√ William M. McCulloch (inc.): 73,448	
1960	Joseph J. Murphy: 52,797	√ William M. McCulloch (inc.): 99,683	
1962	Marjorie Conrad Struns: 32,866	√ William M. McCulloch (inc.): 77,790	
1964	Robert H. Mihlbaugh: 64,667	√ William M. McCulloch (inc.): 81,204	
1966	Robert H. Mihlbaugh: 37,855	√ William M. McCulloch (inc.): 66,142	
1968		√ William M. McCulloch (inc.): 129,435	
1970	Donald B. Laws: 45,619	√ William M. McCulloch (inc.): 82,521	
1972	Dimitri Nicholas: 65,216	√ Tennyson Guyer: 109,612	
1974	James L. Gehrlich: 51,065	√ Tennyson Guyer (inc.): 81,674	
1976	Clinton G. Dorsey: 51,784	√ Tennyson Guyer (inc.): 121,173	
1978	John W. Griffin: 39,360	√ Tennyson Guyer (inc.): 85,575	
1980	Gerry Tebben: 51,150	√ Tennyson Guyer (inc.): 133,795	
1981 (Special)	Dale Locker: 41,526	√ Mike Oxley: 41.904	
1982	Bob Moon: 57,564	√ Mike Oxley (inc.): 105,087	
1984	William O. Sutton: 47,018	√ Mike Oxley (inc.): 162,199	
1986	Clem T. Cratty: 26,320	√ Mike Oxley (inc.): 115,751	Raven L. Workman: 11,997
1988		√ Mike Oxley (inc.): 160,900	
1990	Thomas E. Burkhart: 64,467	√ Mike Oxley (inc.): 103,897	
1992	Raymond M. Ball: 92,608	√ Mike Oxley (inc.): 147,346	
1994		√ Mike Oxley (inc.): 139,841	
1996	Paul Anthony McClain: 69,096	√ Mike Oxley (inc.): 147,608	Michael McCaffery (N): 11,057
1998	Paul Anthony McClain: 63,529	√ Mike Oxley (inc.): 112,011	
2000	Daniel L. Dickman: 67,330	√ Mike Oxley (inc.): 156,510	Ralph Mullinger (L): 8,278
2002	Jim Clark: 57,726	√ Mike Oxley (inc.): 120,001	
2004	Ben Konop: 115,422	√ Mike Oxley (inc.): 163,459	
2006	Richard E. Siferd: 83,929	√ Jim Jordan: 126,542	
2008	Mike Carroll: 93,495	√ Jim Jordan (inc.): 177,017	
2010	Doug Litt: 50,533	√ Jim Jordan (inc.): 146,029	Donald Kissick (L) 7,708
2012	Jim Slone: 114,214	√ Jim Jordan (inc.): 182,643	Chris Kalla (L): 16,141
2014	Janet Garrett: 60,165	√ Jim Jordan (inc.): 125,907	
2016	Janet Garrett: 98,981	√ Jim Jordan (inc.): 210,227	
2018	Janet Garrett: 89,412	√ Jim Jordan (inc.): 167,993	
2020	Shannon Freshour: 101,897	√ Jim Jordan (inc.): 235,875	Steve Perkins: 9,584
2022	Tamie Wilson: 89,383	√ Jim Jordan (inc.): 200,773	
2024	Tamie Wilson: 125,905	√ Jim Jordan (inc.): 273,297	

== See also ==
- List of United States congressional districts
