= Samuel S. Yoder =

American politician

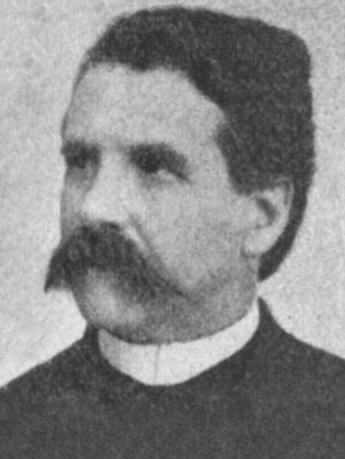

Sergeant at Arms of the United States House of Representatives
- In office December 8, 1891 – August 7, 1893
- Leader: Charles Frederick Crisp
- Preceded by: Adoniram J. Holmes
- Succeeded by: Herman W. Snow

Member of the U.S. House of Representatives from Ohio's 4th district
- In office March 4, 1887 – March 3, 1891
- Preceded by: Charles M. Anderson
- Succeeded by: Martin K. Gantz

Personal details
- Born: August 16, 1841 Berlin, Ohio, US
- Died: May 11, 1921 (aged 79) Washington, D.C., US
- Resting place: Arlington National Cemetery
- Party: Democratic
- Education: Wooster College; University of Michigan

Samuel S. Yoder (August 16, 1841 – May 11, 1921) was an American Civil War veteran and politician who served two terms as a U.S. representative from Ohio from 1887 to 1891.

== Biography ==
Born in Berlin, Ohio, Yoder attended the common schools, Wooster (Ohio) University, and graduated from the University of Michigan at Ann Arbor.

=== Civil War ===
During the American Civil War, he enlisted in the Union Army in the One Hundred and Twenty-eighth Regiment, Ohio Volunteer Infantry, beginning April 19, 1862. He rose to the rank of second lieutenant and served until the end of the war. He was elected as a companion of the Ohio Commandery of the Military Order of the Loyal Legion of the United States.

After the war, he studied medicine and practiced in Bluffton, Ohio, where he served as mayor from 1868 to 1878.

=== Political career ===
Yoder moved to Lima, Ohio, in 1878, and began to study law. He was admitted to the bar in 1880 and commenced practice in Lima. He served as member of the Democratic State executive committee from 1883 to 1885, and as judge of the probate court of Allen County from February 1882 to October 1886, when he resigned, having been elected to Congress.

Yoder was elected as a Democrat to the Fiftieth and Fifty-first Congresses (March 4, 1887 – March 3, 1891). He was not a candidate for renomination in 1890.

=== Later career and death ===
He served as Sergeant at Arms of the House of Representatives from December 8, 1891, to August 7, 1893. He continued the practice of law and also engaged in the real estate business in Washington, D.C., until his death. He is interred in Arlington National Cemetery.

U.S. House of Representatives
Preceded by Charles M. Anderson	Member of the U.S. House of Representatives from Ohio's 4th congressional district 1887–1891	Succeeded by Martin K. Gantz
Preceded by Adoniram J. Holmes	Sergeant at Arms of the United States House of Representatives; 1891–1893	Succeeded by Herman W. Snow
