= John Milton Killits =

American judge (1858–1938)

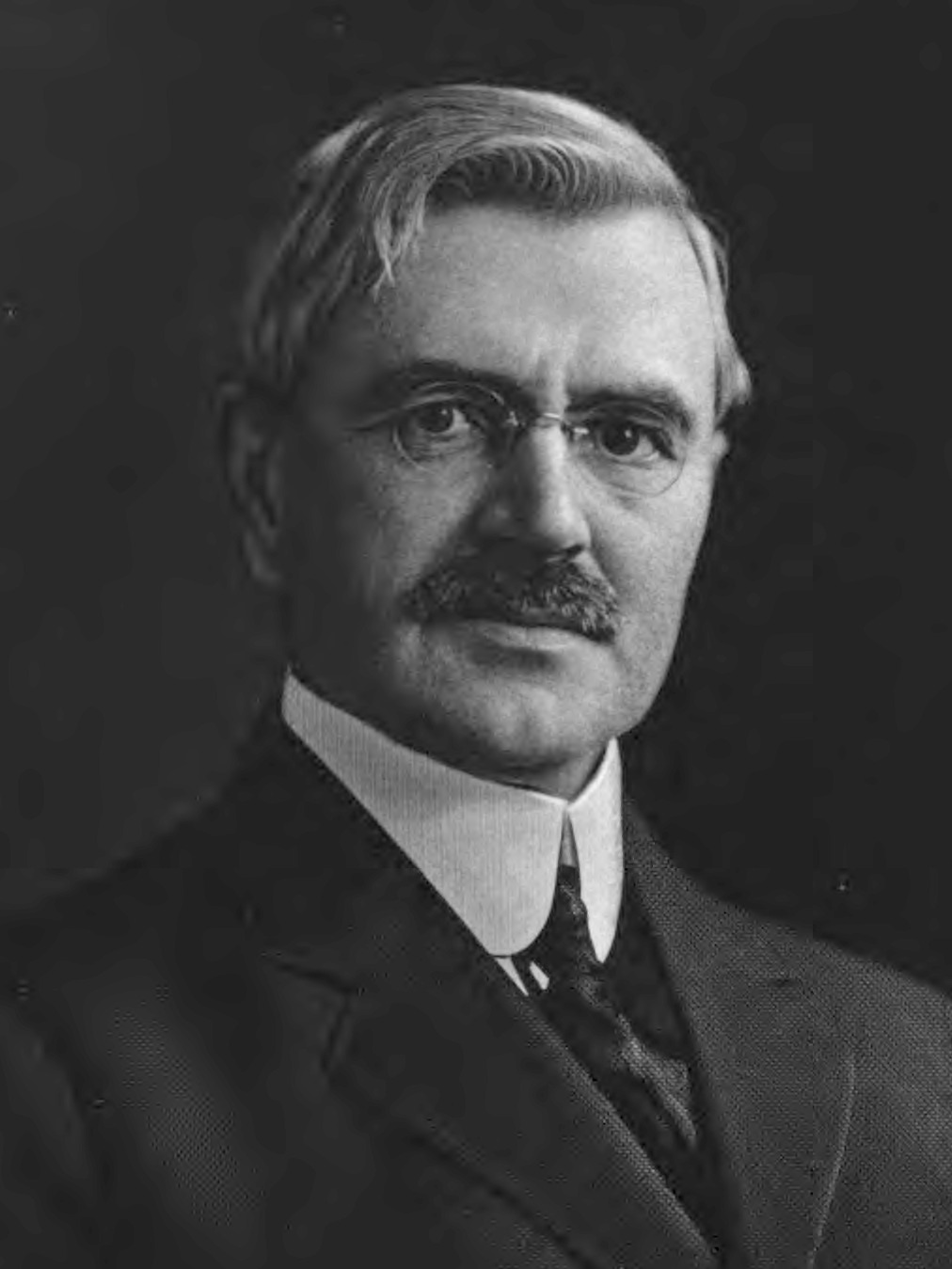
- circa 1917

Senior Judge of the United States District Court for the Northern District of Ohio
- In office October 6, 1928 – September 13, 1938

Judge of the United States District Court for the Northern District of Ohio
- In office June 24, 1910 – October 6, 1928
- Appointed by: William Howard Taft
- Preceded by: Seat established by 36 Stat. 202
- Succeeded by: George Philip Hahn

Personal details
- Born: John Milton Killits; October 7, 1858 Lithopolis, Ohio, U.S.
- Died: September 13, 1938 (aged 79)
- Party: Republican
- Education: Williams College (A.B., A.M.); George Washington University Law School (LL.B., LL.M.)
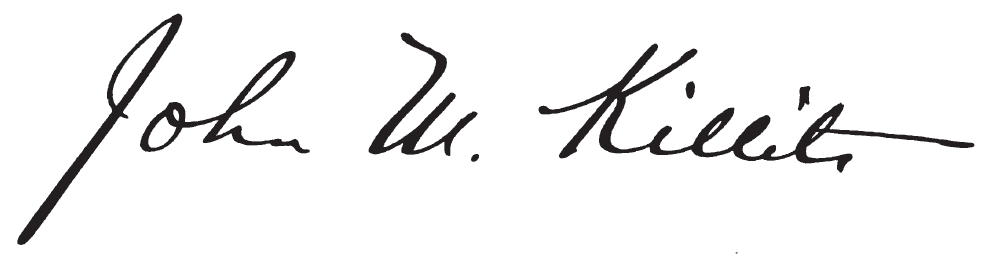
- Signature

John Milton Killits (October 7, 1858 – September 13, 1938) was a United States district judge of the United States District Court for the Northern District of Ohio.

== Education and career ==
Born in Lithopolis, Ohio, Killits received an Artium Baccalaureus degree from Williams College in 1880, a Bachelor of Laws from Columbian University School of Law (now George Washington University Law School) in 1885, a Master of Laws from the same institution in 1886, and an Artium Magister degree from Williams College in 1887. He published a daily and weekly newspaper in Red Oak, Iowa from 1880 to 1883, and worked for the United States Department of War in Washington, D.C., starting March 1884, before becoming private secretary to General William Babcock Hazen, chief signal officer of the United States Army. He was in private practice in Bryan, Ohio from 1888 to 1904, also working as a prosecuting attorney of Williams County, Ohio from 1893 to 1899. He was a Judge of the Court of Common Pleas for the Third Ohio District from 1905 to 1910.

== Federal judicial service ==
On June 21, 1910, Killits was nominated by President William Howard Taft to a new seat on the United States District Court for the Northern District of Ohio created by 36 Stat. 202. He was confirmed by the United States Senate on June 24, 1910, and received his commission the same day. He assumed senior status on October 6, 1928, serving in that capacity until his death on September 13, 1938.

== Personal ==
Killits was married to Alice Nourse Steuart, June 21, 1887, in Washington, D.C., and had two daughters.

== Memberships ==
Killits was a member of several Quadrennial General Conferences of the Methodist Episcopal Church. He was a Mason, Chi Psi, Phi Delta Phi, Knights of Pythias, and a Republican.

== Other interests ==
Killits had hobbies including carpentry, motor boating, the study of sociology and the history of the bible.

== Sources ==
Legal offices
| Preceded by Seat established by 36 Stat. 202 | Judge of the United States District Court for the Northern District of Ohio; 1910–1928 | Succeeded by George Philip Hahn |
