= Robert B. Gordon =

American politician

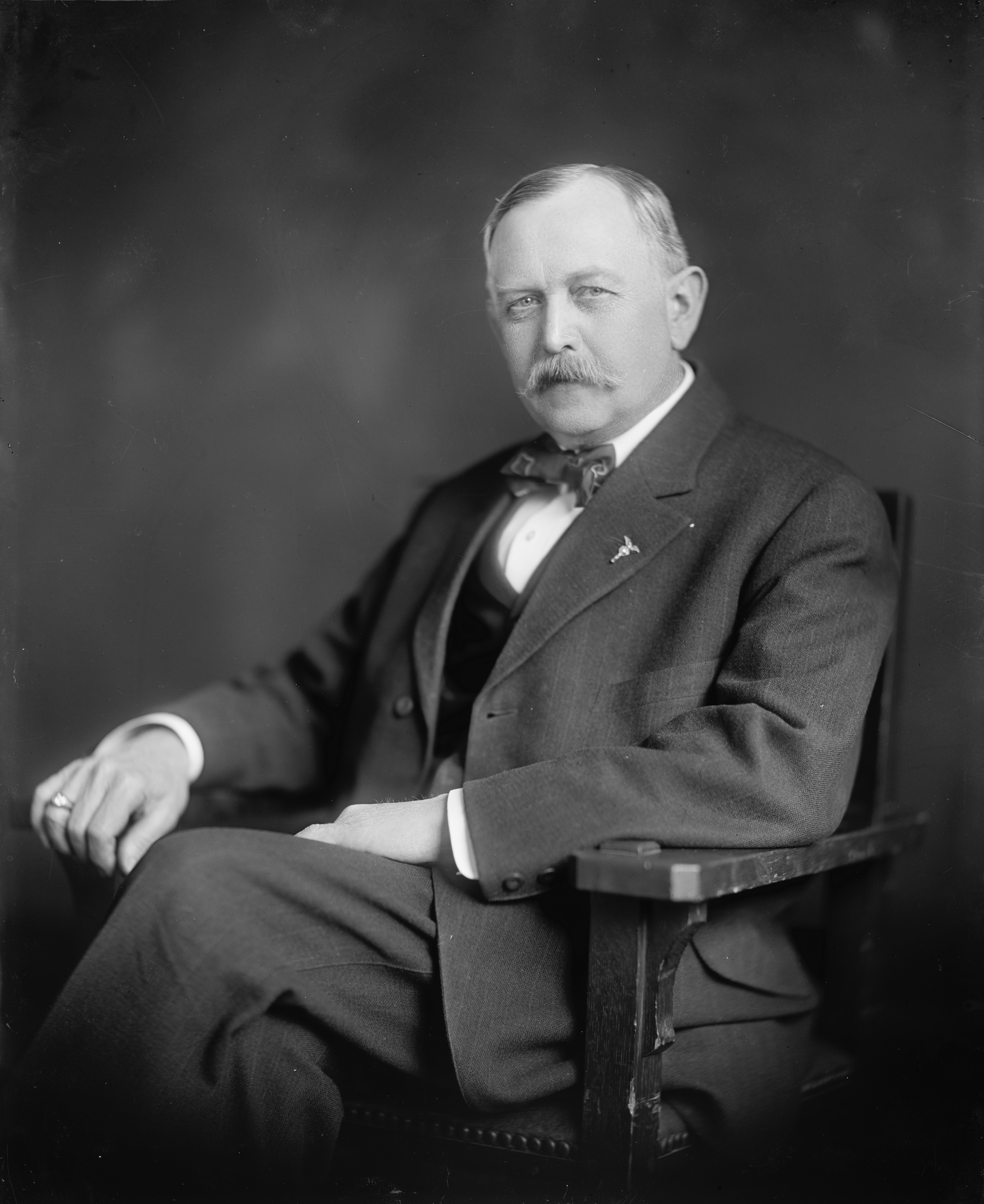

Member of the U.S. House of Representatives from Ohio's 4th district
- In office March 4, 1899 – March 3, 1903
- Preceded by: George A. Marshall
- Succeeded by: Harvey C. Garber

22nd Sergeant at Arms of the United States House of Representatives
- In office 1913–1919
- Leader: Champ Clark
- Preceded by: Charles F. Riddell
- Succeeded by: Joseph G. Rogers

Personal details
- Born: Robert Bryarly Gordon; August 6, 1855 St. Marys, Ohio, U.S.
- Died: January 3, 1923 (aged 67) Washington, D.C., U.S.
- Resting place: Elm Grove Cemetery, St. Marys, Ohio
- Party: Democratic

Robert Bryarly Gordon (August 6, 1855 – January 3, 1923) was a U.S. representative from Ohio for two terms from 1899 to 1903.

== Biography ==
Born at St. Marys, Auglaize County, Ohio, Gordon attended the public schools.

=== Political activities ===
He served as Postmaster of St. Marys from 1885 to 1889, as auditor of Auglaize County from 1890 to 1896, and served as delegate to the Democratic National Convention in 1896.

Gordon was elected as a Democrat to the Fifty-sixth and Fifty-seventh Congresses (March 4, 1899 – March 3, 1903).

=== Later career ===
He later engaged in the flour and grain business at St. Marys, Ohio. He served as superintendent of the document room of the House of Representatives from 1911 to 1913, and as Sergeant at Arms of the House of Representatives from 1913 to 1919.

=== Death and burial ===
He died in Washington, D.C., and is interred in Elm Grove Cemetery, St. Marys, Ohio.

== Sources ==
- United States Congress. "Robert B. Gordon (id: G000314)". Biographical Directory of the United States Congress.

U.S. House of Representatives
Preceded by George A. Marshall	Member of the U.S. House of Representatives from Ohio's 4th congressional district 1899 - 1903	Succeeded by Harvey C. Garber
Preceded by Charles F. Riddell	Sergeant at Arms of the United States House of Representatives; 1913 - 1919	Succeeded by Joseph G. Rogers
