= 101st Ohio Infantry Regiment =

- Active: August 30, 1862, to June 12, 1865
- Country: United States
- Allegiance: Union
- Branch: Infantry
- Engagements: Defense of Cincinnati; Battle of Perryville; Battle of Stones River; Tullahoma Campaign; Battle of Chickamauga; Siege of Chattanooga; Battle of Lookout Mountain; Atlanta campaign; Battle of Rocky Face Ridge; Battle of Resaca; Battle of Kennesaw Mountain; Siege of Atlanta; Battle of Jonesboro; Second Battle of Franklin; Battle of Nashville

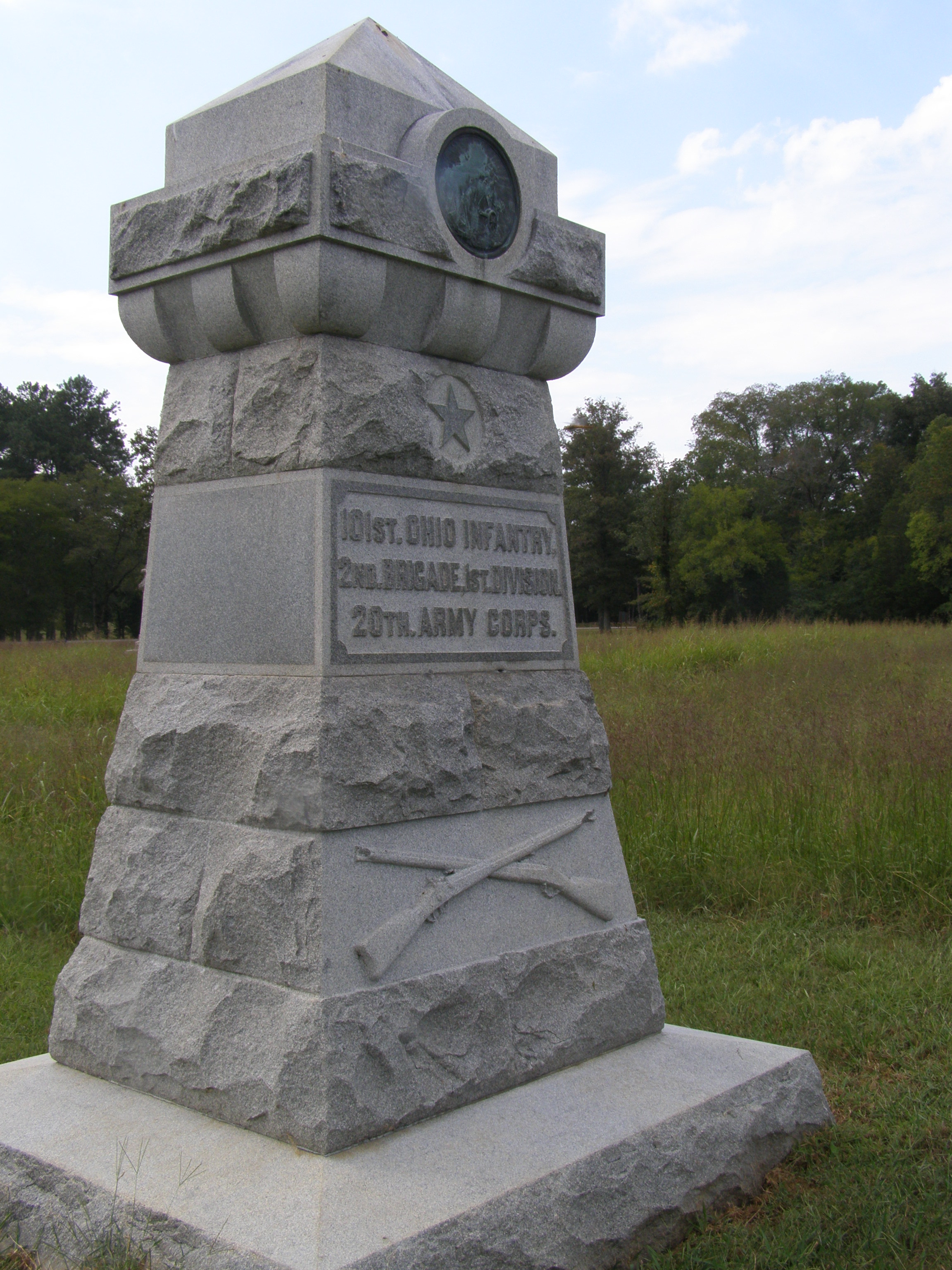
101st Ohio Infantry Regiment memorial at the Chickamauga and Chattanooga National Military Park

The 101st Ohio Infantry Regiment, sometimes 101st Ohio Volunteer Infantry (or 101st OVI) was an infantry regiment in the Union Army during the American Civil War.

== Service ==
The 101st Ohio Infantry was organized at Monroeville, Ohio, and mustered in for three years service on August 30, 1862, under the command of Colonel Leander Stem.

The regiment was attached to:

- 31st Brigade, 9th Division, Army of the Ohio, September 1862.
- 31st Brigade, 9th Division, III Corps, Army of the Ohio, to November 1862.
- 2nd Brigade, 1st Division, Right Wing, XIV Corps, Army of the Cumberland, to January 1863.
- 2nd Brigade, 1st Division, XX Corps, Army of the Cumberland, to October 1863.
- 1st Brigade, 1st Division, IV Corps, Army of the Cumberland, to June 1865.

The 101st Ohio Infantry mustered out of service at Nashville, Tennessee, on June 12, 1865.

== Detailed service ==
- Left Ohio for Covington, KY, September 4,
- Moved to Louisville, KY, September 24.
- Pursuit of Bragg into Kentucky October 1–15.
- Battle of Perryville, Kentucky, October 8.
- March to Nashville, Tennessee, October 16-November 7, and duty there until December 26.
- Advance on Murfreesboro, Tennessee, December 26–30.
- Nolensville, Tennessee, December 26.
- Battle of Stones River, December 30–31, 1862 and January 1–3, 1863.
- Duty at Murfreesboro until June.
- Reconnaissance from Murfreesboro, March 6–7.
- Reconnaissance to Versailles, Kentucky March 9–14.
- Operations on Edgefield Pike, near Murfreesboro, June 4.
- Tullahoma Campaign, June 23-July 7.
- Liberty Gap, June 24–27.
- Occupation of middle Tennessee until, August 16.
- Passage of the Cumberland Mountains and Tennessee River, and Chickamauga Campaign, August 16-September 22.
- Battle of Chickamauga, September 19–20.
- Siege of Chattanooga, September 24-October 26.
- Reopening Tennessee River, October 26–28.
- Moved to Bridgeport, Alabama, October 28, and duty there until January 16, 1864, and at Ooltewah, Tennessee, until May.
- Atlanta campaign, May to September.
- Tunnel Hill, Georgia, May 6–7.
- Demonstrations on Rocky Faced Ridge and Dalton, Georgia, May 8–13.
- Buzzard's Roost Gap, May 8–9.
- Battle of Resaca, May 14–15.
- Near Kingston, Georgia, May 18–19.
- Near Cassville, Georgia, May 19.
- Advance on Dallas, Georgia, May 22–25.
- Operations on line of Pumpkin Vine Creek and battles of Dallas, New Hope Church and Allatoona Hills, May 25-June 5.
- Operations about Marietta, Georgia, and against Kennesaw Mountain, June 10 – July 2.
- Pine Hill, June 11–14.
- Lost Mountain, June 15–17.
- Battle of Kennesaw Mountain, June 27.
- Ruff's Station, Battle of Smyrna Camp Ground, July 4.
- Chattahoochie River, July 5–17.
- Battle of Peachtree Creek, July 19–20.
- Siege of Atlanta, July 22-August 25.
- Flank movement on Jonesboro, August 25–30.
- Battle of Jonesborough, August 31-September 1.
- Battle of Lovejoy's Station, September 2–6.
- Operations against John Bell Hood in northern Georgia and northern Alabama, October 3–26.
- Franklin–Nashville Campaign, November–December.
- Battle of Columbia, Duck River, November 24–27.
- Battle of Franklin, November 30.
- Battle of Nashville, December 15–16.
- Pursuit of Hood to the Tennessee River December 17–28.
- Moved to Huntsville, Alabama, and duty there until March 1865.
- Operations in eastern Tennessee, March 15-April 22.
- Moved to Nashville, Tennessee, and duty there until June.

== Casualties ==
The regiment lost a total of 236 men during service; 9 officers and 86 enlisted men killed or mortally wounded, 1 officer and 140 enlisted men died of disease.

== Commanders ==
- Colonel Leander Stem - killed in action at the battle of Stones River
- Colonel Isaac Minor Kirby - commanded at the battle of Stones River as major
- Lieutenant Colonel Moses F. Wooster - commanded at the battle of Stones River
- Lieutenant Colonel John Messer - commanded at the battle of Chickamauga
- Lieutenant Colonel Bedan B. McDonald - commanded at the battle of Stones River as captain, at the battle of Chickamauga as major, and at the battle of Nashville as lieutenant colonel
- Captain Leonard D. Smith - commanded at the battle of Chickamauga

== Notable members ==
- Chaplain Erastus Milo Cravath - a founder of Fisk University and its president for 25 years
- Private George S. Myers, Company F - Medal of Honor recipient for action at the battle of Chickamauga
- 1st Lieutenant George Ebbert Seney, quartermaster - U.S. Representative from Ohio, 1883–1891
- Private Jacob F. Yeager, Company H - Medal of Honor recipient for action at the battle of Rocky Face Ridge

== See also ==
- List of Ohio Civil War units
- Ohio in the Civil War
