= Harvey C. Garber =

American politician

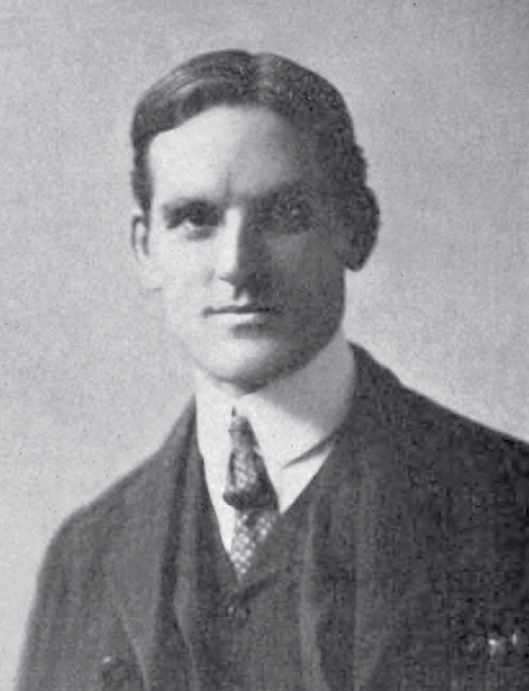

Member of the U.S. House of Representatives from Ohio's 4th district
- In office March 4, 1903 – March 3, 1907
- Preceded by: Robert B. Gordon
- Succeeded by: William E. Tou Velle

Member of the Ohio House of Representatives from the Darke County district
- In office January 6, 1890 – January 2, 1894
- Preceded by: Andrew C. Robeson
- Succeeded by: Charle W. Hoeffer

Personal details
- Born: Henry Cable Garber; July 6, 1866 Hill Grove, Ohio, US
- Died: March 23, 1938 (aged 71) Naples, Florida, US
- Resting place: Greenville Cemetery, Greenville, Ohio
- Party: Democratic

Harvey Cable Garber (July 6, 1866 – March 23, 1938) was an American politician who served as a U.S. representative from Ohio from 1903 to 1907.

== Biography ==
Harvey C. Garber was born in Hill Grove, Ohio on July 6, 1866. Garber moved to Greenville, Ohio, with his parents in 1872, where he attended public schools. He was later Manager of the Western Union Telegraph Co., and was Superintendent of the Central Union Telephone Co. for Ohio. He served four years as assistant general solicitor.

=== Political career ===
Garber served as member of the Ohio House of Representatives from 1890 to 1893. He served as chairman of the Democratic State committee in 1901 and chairman of the Democratic State executive committee from 1902 to 1908.

Garber was elected as a Democrat to the Fifty-eighth in 1902 and Fifty-ninth Congress in 1904. He was not a candidate for renomination in 1906.

=== Later career ===
Garber moved to Columbus, Ohio, in 1910 and served as assistant to the president of the Bell Telephone Co. in Ohio, Indiana, and Illinois from 1910 to 1915. Garber also studied law. He was admitted to the bar in 1921 and commenced practice in Columbus, Ohio.

=== Death and burial ===
Garber died at his winter home in Naples, Florida, March 23, 1938. He was interred in Greenville Cemetery, Greenville, Ohio.

== Sources ==
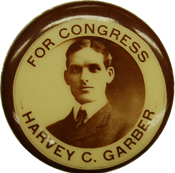

- United States Congress. "Harvey C. Garber (id: G000044)". Biographical Directory of the United States Congress.

U.S. House of Representatives
Preceded by Robert B. Gordon	Member of the U.S. House of Representatives from Ohio's 4th congressional district 1903–1907	Succeeded by William E. Tou Velle
