= Benjamin F. Welty =

American politician

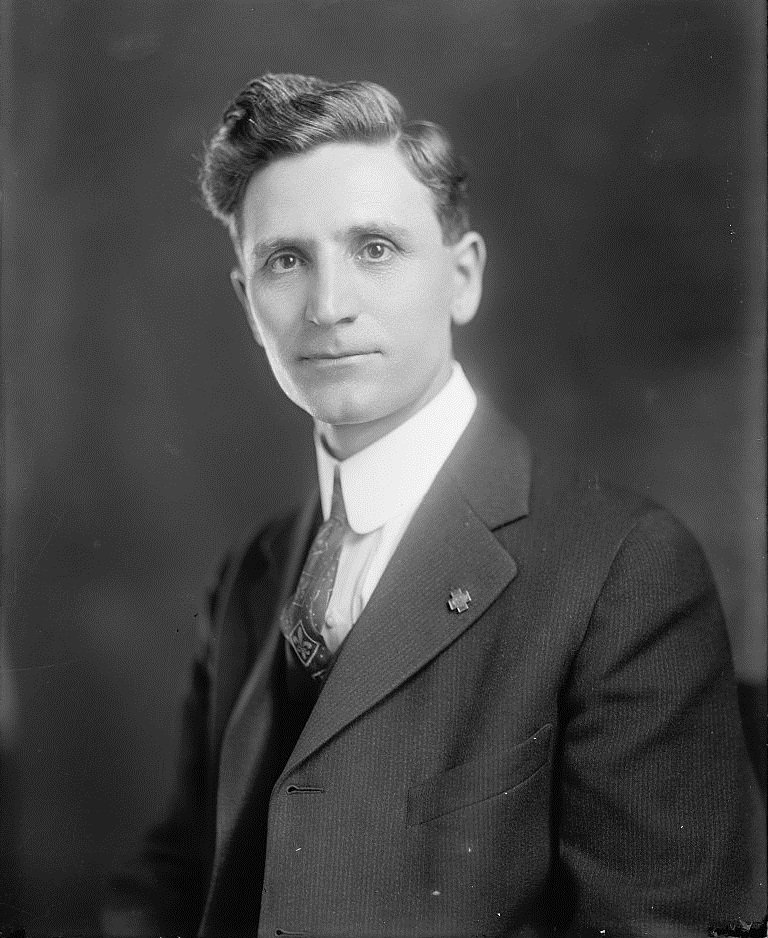

Member of the U.S. House of Representatives from Ohio's 4th district
- In office March 4, 1917 – March 3, 1921
- Preceded by: J. Edward Russell
- Succeeded by: John L. Cable

Personal details
- Born: Benjamin Franklin Welty; August 9, 1870 Bluffton, Ohio, U.S.
- Died: October 23, 1962 (aged 92) Dayton, Ohio, U.S.
- Resting place: Woodlawn Cemetery, Shawnee Township, Ohio
- Party: Democratic
- Education: Ohio Northern University; University of Michigan

Benjamin Franklin Welty (August 9, 1870 – October 23, 1962) was an American soldier and attorney who served two terms as a U.S. representative from Ohio from 1917 to 1921.

== Early life and military service ==
Born near Bluffton, Ohio, and Pandora, Ohio, Welty's parents emigrated from Switzerland to Ohio in the mid-1800s. He attended the common schools and the Tri-State Normal College of Indiana. He graduated from the Ohio Northern University at Ada in 1894 and from the University of Michigan at Ann Arbor in 1896. He studied law, and was admitted to the bar in 1896 and commenced practice in Lima, Ohio.

He served as city solicitor of Bluffton from 1897 to 1909.

=== Spanish-American War ===
He also served as a private during the Spanish–American War.

== Legal and political career ==
He became prosecuting attorney of Allen County 1905–1910, and was a lieutenant colonel in the Ohio National Guard 1908–1913. He served as special counsel to the Ohio Attorney General 1911–1913, and was a special assistant in the United States Department of Justice 1913–1915.

=== Congress ===
Welty was elected as a Democrat to the Sixty-fifth and Sixty-sixth Congresses (March 4, 1917 – March 3, 1921). He was an unsuccessful candidate for reelection in 1920 to the Sixty-seventh Congress.

=== Later career ===
After his Congressional career, he was employed with Inland Waterways Association 1921–1924. He resumed the practice of law until 1951, when he retired.

== Death and burial ==
He died in Dayton, Ohio, October 23, 1962. He was interred in Woodlawn Cemetery, Shawnee Township, Ohio.

U.S. House of Representatives
Preceded by J. Edward Russell	Member of the U.S. House of Representatives from Ohio's 4th congressional district 1917–1921	Succeeded by John L. Cable
