= George Alexander Marshall =

American lawyer and politician (1851–1899)

George A. Marshall
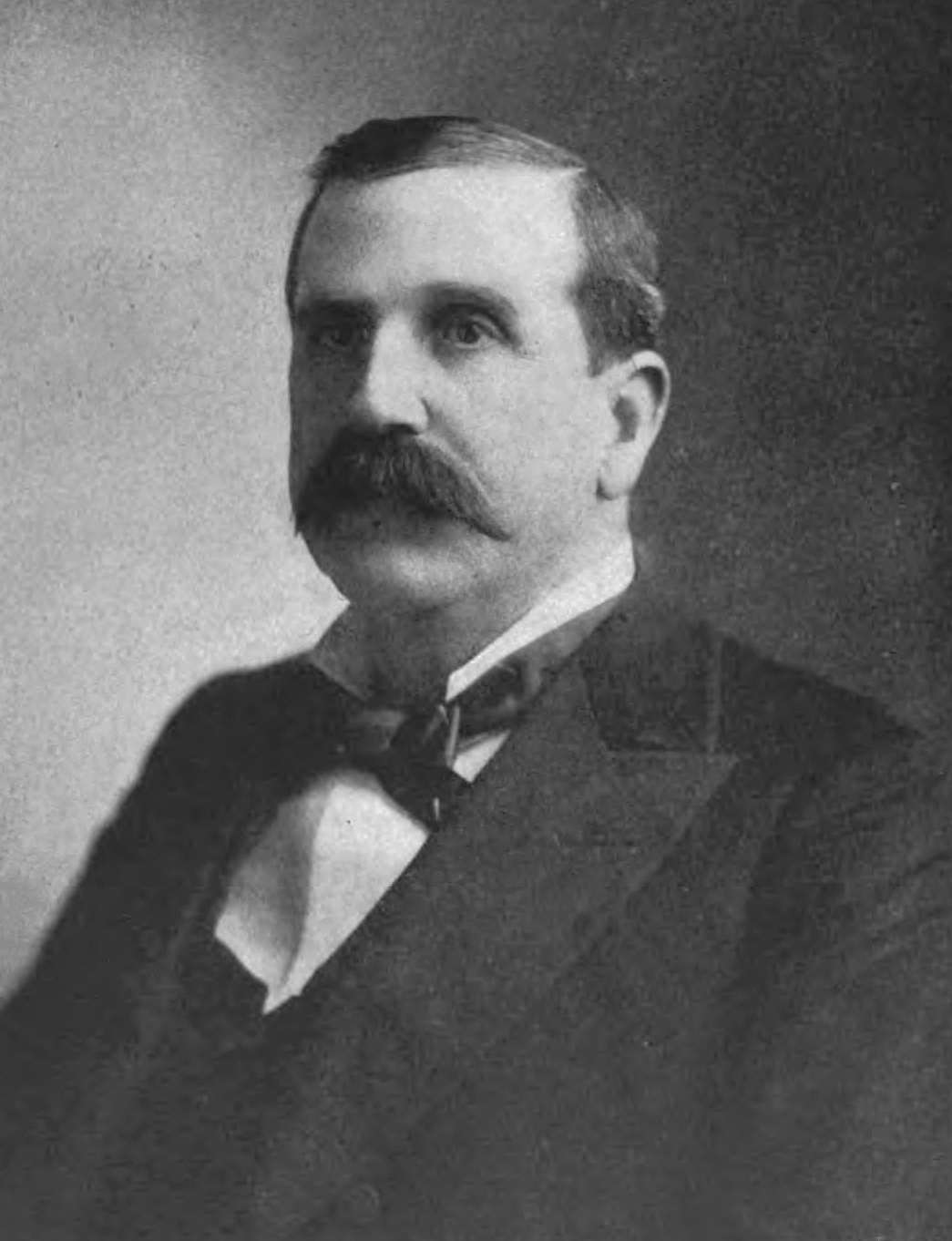

Member of the U.S. House of Representatives from Ohio's 4th district
- In office March 4, 1897 – March 3, 1899
- Preceded by: Fernando C. Layton
- Succeeded by: Robert B. Gordon

Personal details
- Born: George Alexander Marshall; September 14, 1851 Sidney, Ohio, US
- Died: April 21, 1899 (aged 47) Sidney, Ohio, US
- Resting place: Presbyterian Cemetery, Hardin, Ohio
- Party: Democratic
- Spouse(s): Mary Caroline Cowan; Lucinda Frazer Cowan
- Education: Ohio Wesleyan University

George Alexander Marshall (September 14, 1851 – April 21, 1899) was an American lawyer and politician who served as a one-term U.S. Representative from Ohio from 1897 to 1899.

== Early life and career ==
Born near Sidney, Ohio, Marshall attended the public schools of Shelby County, Ohio, and Ohio Wesleyan University, Delaware, Ohio. He studied law.

=== Family ===
In 1872 he married Mary Caroline Cowan, the daughter of Wilson V. Cowan, a local physician. She died in 1874 while giving birth to their first child. On December 8, 1880, he married Lucinda Frazer Cowan, Mary Caroline's youngest sister.

=== Early career ===
He was admitted to the bar in 1876 and commenced practice in Sidney, Ohio.

He served as prosecuting attorney of Shelby County for eight years, being elected in 1878, 1880, and 1883.

== Congress ==
Marshall was elected as a Democrat to the Fifty-fifth Congress (March 4, 1897 – March 3, 1899). He was not a candidate for reelection in 1898.

== Death ==
He died in Sidney, Ohio, April 21, 1899. He was interred in Presbyterian Cemetery, Hardin, Ohio.

== Sources ==
- United States Congress. "George Alexander Marshall (id: M000153)". Biographical Directory of the United States Congress.

U.S. House of Representatives
Preceded by Fernando C. Layton	Member of the U.S. House of Representatives from Ohio's 5th congressional district 1899–1903	Succeeded by Robert B. Gordon
