= Frank Le Blond Kloeb =

American judge

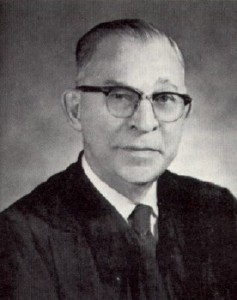

Senior Judge of the United States District Court for the Northern District of Ohio
- In office September 30, 1964 – March 11, 1976

Chief Judge of the United States District Court for the Northern District of Ohio
- In office 1959–1960
- Preceded by: Paul Jones
- Succeeded by: Charles Joseph McNamee

Judge of the United States District Court for the Northern District of Ohio
- In office August 20, 1937 – September 30, 1964
- Appointed by: Franklin D. Roosevelt
- Preceded by: George Philip Hahn
- Succeeded by: Don John Young

Member of the U.S. House of Representatives from Ohio's 4th district
- In office March 4, 1933 – August 19, 1937
- Preceded by: John L. Cable
- Succeeded by: Walter H. Albaugh

Personal details
- Born: Frank Le Blond Kloeb; June 16, 1890 Celina, Ohio, U.S.
- Died: March 11, 1976 (aged 85) Toledo, Ohio, U.S.
- Resting place: Calvary Cemetery
- Party: Democratic
- Relatives: Francis Celeste Le Blond
- Education: Ohio State University; University of Wisconsin–Madison; Ohio State University Moritz College of Law

Frank Le Blond Kloeb (June 16, 1890 – March 11, 1976), also known as Frank L. Kloeb, was a Democratic United States Representative from Ohio, serving two terms from 1933 to 1937. He was also a United States district judge of the United States District Court for the Northern District of Ohio. He is the most recent Democrat to represent his district in the House of Representatives.

== Education and career ==
Kloeb (grandson of Francis Celeste Le Blond) was born in Celina, Ohio. He attended the parochial and public schools, Ohio State University at Columbus and the University of Wisconsin–Madison. During the First World War, Kloeb enlisted as a seaman in the United States Navy, advanced to quartermaster, third class, and then to ensign, and served from September 1917 to March 1919. He graduated from the Ohio State University Moritz College of Law in 1917, was admitted to the bar the same year and commenced practice in Celina in April 1919. He served as prosecuting attorney of Mercer County, Ohio, from 1921 to 1925. He continued in private practice until 1933.

== Congressional service ==
Kloeb was elected as a Democrat to the 73rd United States Congress and reelected to the two succeeding Congresses. He served from March 4, 1933, until August 19, 1937, when he resigned to accept a federal judicial appointment.

== Federal judicial service ==
Kloeb was nominated by President Franklin D. Roosevelt on June 18, 1937, to a seat on the United States District Court for the Northern District of Ohio vacated by Judge George Philip Hahn. He was confirmed by the United States Senate on June 22, 1937, and received his commission on August 20, 1937. He served as Chief Judge from 1959 to 1960. He assumed senior status on September 30, 1964. His service terminated on March 11, 1976, due to his death in Toledo, Ohio. He was interred in Calvary Cemetery.

== Family ==
Kloeb and his wife, formerly Florence Root, had one daughter.

== Sources ==
- United States Congress. "Frank Le Blond Kloeb (id: K000271)". Biographical Directory of the United States Congress. Retrieved on 2008-01-24.

U.S. House of Representatives
Preceded by John L. Cable	Member of the U.S. House of Representatives from Ohio's 4th congressional district 1933–1937	Succeeded by Walter H. Albaugh
Legal offices
Preceded by George Philip Hahn	Judge of the United States District Court for the Northern District of Ohio; 1937–1964	Succeeded by Don John Young
Preceded by Paul Jones	Chief Judge of the United States District Court for the Northern District of Ohio; 1959–1960	Succeeded by Charles Joseph McNamee
