= 1943 Columbus, Ohio mayoral election =

- November 2, 1943
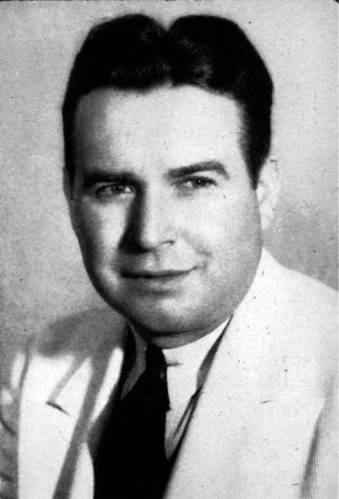

Candidate	Jim Rhodes	Jacob E. Sandusky
Party	nonpartisan candidate	nonpartisan candidate
Popular vote	38,000	26,500
Percentage	58.92%	41.09%
Mayor before election
Floyd F. Green
Elected mayor
Jim Rhodes

The Columbus, Ohio, mayoral election of 1943 saw the election of Jim Rhodes.

== Primary election ==
The primary as held on August 10.

1943 Columbus mayoral election
Party	Candidate	Votes	%
nonpartisan candidate	Jim Rhodes	16,643	31.33%
nonpartisan candidate	Jacob E. Sandusky	11,205	21.09%
nonpartisan candidate	Floyd F. Green (incumbent)	8,354	15.73%
nonpartisan candidate	Hayden Edwards	8,256	15.54%
nonpartisan candidate	Arthur P. Lamneck	6,782	12.77%
nonpartisan candidate	N. A. Thatcher	1,885	3.55%
Turnout		53,125	

== General election ==
The general election was held on November 2.

1943 Columbus mayoral election
Party	Candidate	Votes	%
nonpartisan candidate	Jim Rhodes	38,000	58.92%
nonpartisan candidate	Jacob E. Sandusky	26,500	41.09%
Turnout		64,500	

== See also ==
- List of mayors of Columbus, Ohio
