= 1991 Columbus, Ohio mayoral election =

- November 5, 1991
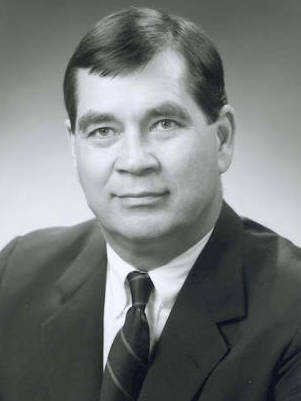

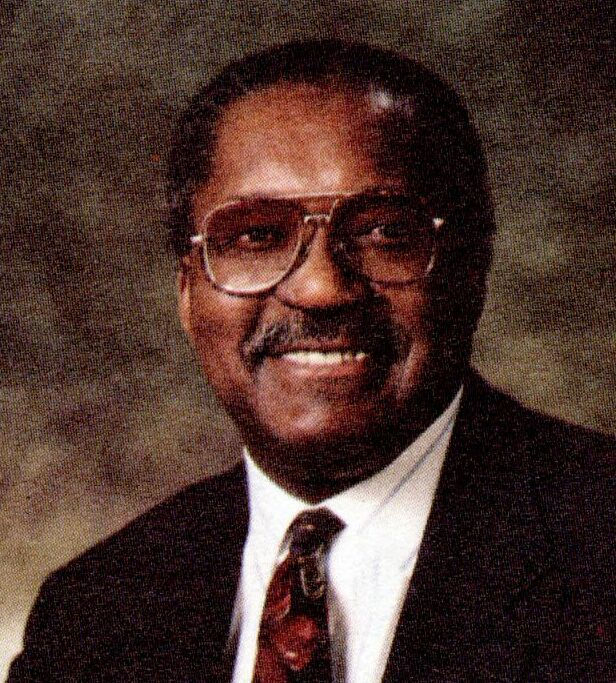
Candidate	Greg Lashutka	Ben Espy
Party	Republican	Democratic
Popular vote	85,985	79,083
Percentage	52.09%	47.91%
Mayor before election
Buck Rinehart
Republican
Elected mayor
Greg Lashutka
Republican

The Columbus mayoral election of 1991 was the 79th mayoral election in Columbus, Ohio. It was held on Tuesday, November 5, 1991. Republican party incumbent mayor Buck Rinehart retired from office after serving two consecutive terms. Republican party nominee Greg Lashutka defeated Democratic party nominee Ben Espy.

== Bibliography ==
- "Republican Wins; Councilman Fails in Bid to be First Black Mayor". Columbus, Ohio: The Associated Press. November 6, 1991.
- "Franklin County Board of Elections". vote.franklincountyohio.gov.
