= 1982 Ohio State Treasurer election =

- November 2, 1982
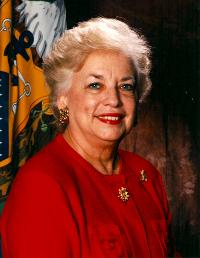

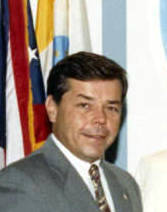

| Nominee | Mary Ellen Withrow | Buck Rinehart | Thomas V. Brown |
| Party | Democratic | Republican | Libertarian |
| Popular vote | 1,541,199 | 1,470,172 | 195,957 |
| Percentage | 48.05% | 45.84% | 6.11% |
- County results Withrow: 40-50% 50–60% 60–70% Rinehart: 40-50% 50–60% 60–70%
Ohio State Treasurer before election
Gertrude Walton Donahey
Democratic
Elected Ohio State Treasurer
Mary Ellen Withrow
Democratic

The 1982 Ohio State Treasurer election was held on November 2, 1982, to elect the Ohio State Treasurer. Democratic incumbent Ohio State Treasurer Gertrude Walton Donahey chose not to seek re-election following an embezzlement scandal. Primaries were held on June 8, 1982.

Democratic Marion County Treasurer Mary Ellen Withrow narrowly won the election, defeating Republican Franklin County Treasurer Buck Rinehart and Libertarian Thomas V. Brown by two percentage points.

== Democratic primary ==
=== Candidates ===
- Mary Ellen Withrow, Marion County Treasurer (1977–1983)
- James R. Williams, lawyer
- Kenneth Cox, Ohio State Senator (1977–1982)
- Michael P. Kelly
- Richard L. Wittenberg, former Ohio State House Representative (1973–1974)
- Lee C. Falke, Montgomery County Prosecutor (1965–1992)
- Timothy G. Lemire

=== Campaign ===
Mary Ellen Withrow won a crowded seven-way Democratic primary by a razor-thin margin of 0.32 percentage points over lawyer James R. Williams.

=== Results ===
Democratic primary results
| Party | Candidate | Votes | % |
|---|---|---|---|
| Democratic | Mary Ellen Withrow | 165,380 | 20.28% |
| Democratic | James R. Williams | 162,776 | 19.96% |
| Democratic | Kenneth Cox | 149,252 | 18.30% |
| Democratic | Michael P. Kelly | 127,266 | 15.61% |
| Democratic | Richard L. Wittenberg | 89,356 | 10.96% |
| Democratic | Lee C. Falke | 87,308 | 10.71% |
| Democratic | Timothy G. Lemire | 34,138 | 4.19% |
| Total votes | | 815,476 | 100.00% |

== Republican primary ==
=== Candidates ===
- Buck Rinehart, Franklin County Treasurer (1976–1984)
- Richard H. Harris
- Howard Knight, former Ohio State House Representative (1963–1972)

=== Campaign ===
Buck Rinehart easily won the Republican nomination over his two opponents, winning by over 20 percentage points.

=== Results ===
Republican primary results
| Party | Candidate | Votes | % |
|---|---|---|---|
| Republican | Buck Rinehart | 307,639 | 52.57% |
| Republican | Richard H. Harris | 181,850 | 31.08% |
| Republican | Howard Knight | 95,668 | 16.35% |
| Total votes | | 585,157 | 100.00% |

== General election ==
=== Candidates ===
- Mary Ellen Withrow, Marion County Treasurer (1977–1983) (Democratic)
- Buck Rinehart, Franklin County Treasurer (1976–1984) (Republican)
- Thomas V. Brown (Libertarian)

=== Results ===
1982 Ohio State Treasurer election results
| Party | Candidate | Votes | % | ±% |
|---|---|---|---|---|
| Democratic | Mary Ellen Withrow | 1,541,199 | 48.05% | −15.46% |
| Republican | Buck Rinehart | 1,470,172 | 45.84% | +9.35% |
| Libertarian | Thomas V. Brown | 195,957 | 6.11% | N/A |
| Total votes | | 3,207,328 | 100.00% | |
| Democratic hold | | | | |
