= 1995 Columbus, Ohio mayoral election =

- November 7, 1995
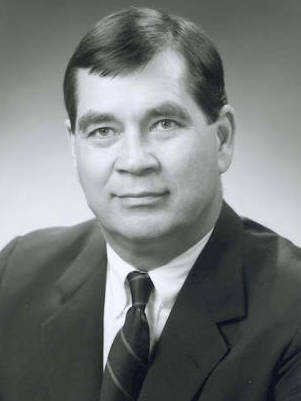

Candidate	Greg Lashutka	Bill Moss
Party	Republican	Democratic
Popular vote	79,128	37,371
Percentage	67.92%	32.08%
Mayor before election
Greg Lashutka
Republican
Elected mayor
Greg Lashutka
Republican

The Columbus mayoral election of 1995 was the 80th mayoral election in Columbus, Ohio. It was held on Tuesday, November 7, 1995. Republican party incumbent mayor Greg Lashutka defeated Democratic party nominee Bill Moss.

== Bibliography ==
"1995 - Franklin County Board of Elections". Franklin County Board of Elections. November 7, 1995.
