= 1899 Columbus, Ohio mayoral election =

- April 3, 1899
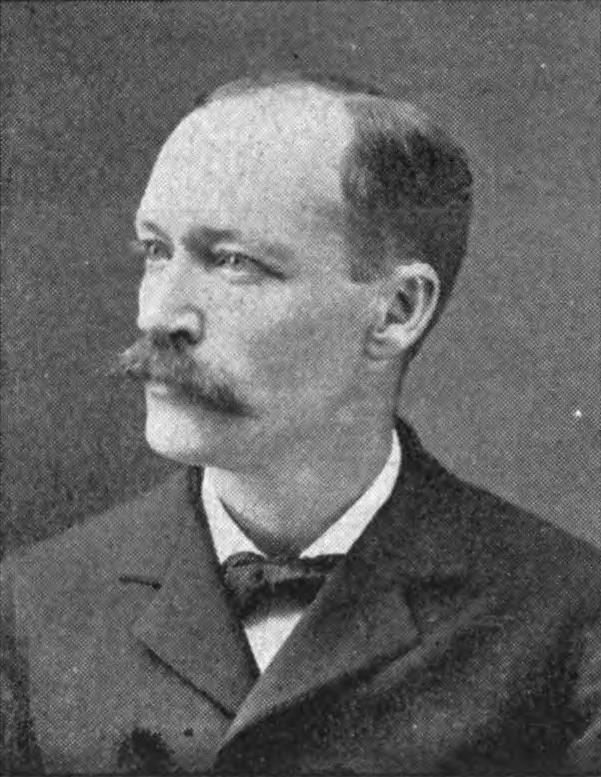

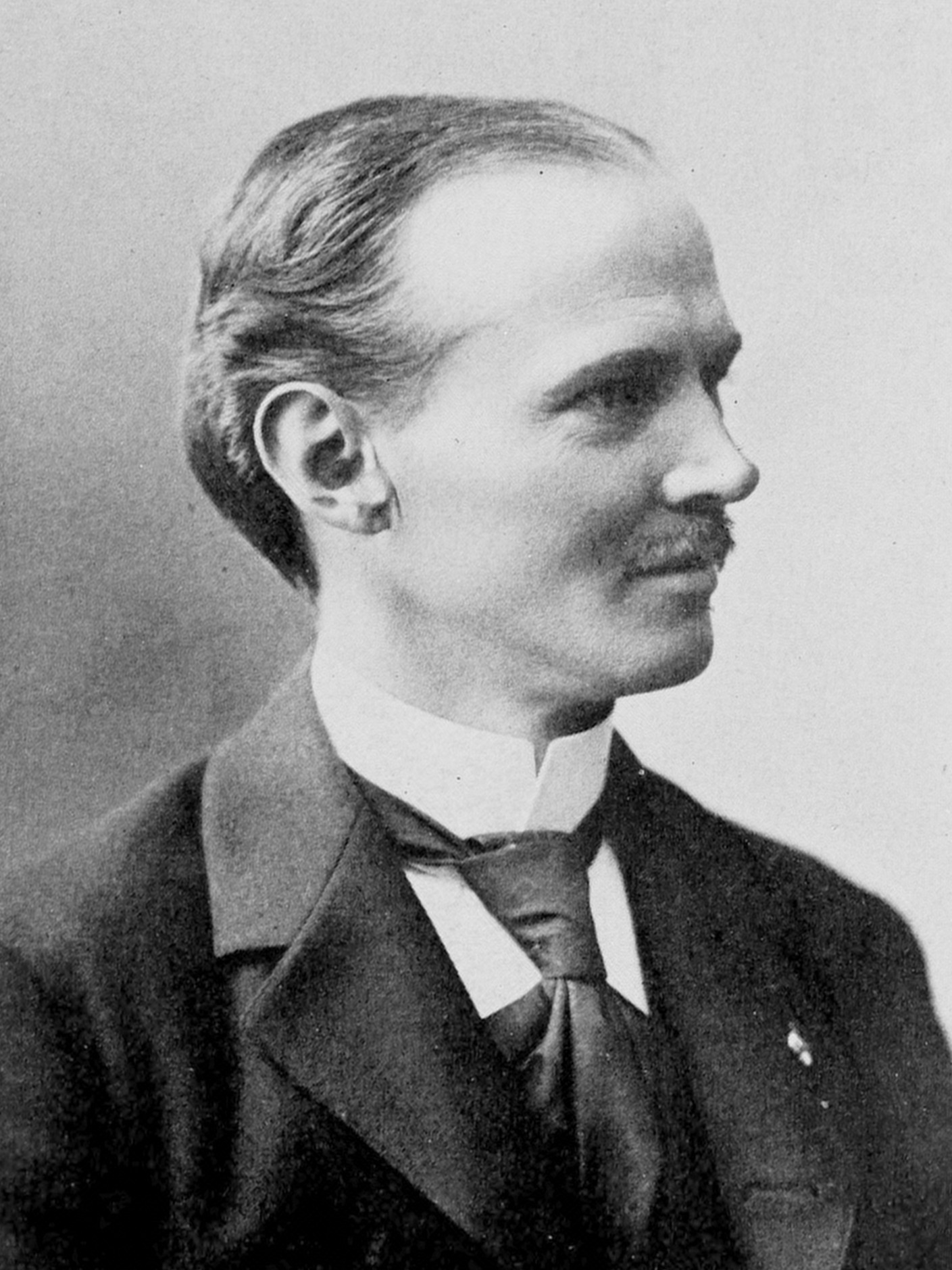
Candidate	Samuel J. Swartz	Samuel L. Black
Party	Republican	Democratic
Popular vote	14,151	12,758
Mayor before election
Samuel L. Black
Democratic
Elected mayor
Samuel J. Swartz
Republican

The Columbus mayoral election of 1899 was the 52nd mayoral election in Columbus, Ohio. It was held on Monday, April 3, 1899. Democratic party incumbent mayor Samuel L. Black was defeated by Republican party nominee Samuel J. Swartz.

== Bibliography ==
- "Republican Victories In Ohio State; Columbus". The San Francisco Call. Chronicling America: Historic American Newspapers. Library of Congress. April 4, 1899. pp. 2, col. 2.
