= 1999 Columbus, Ohio mayoral election =

- November 2, 1999
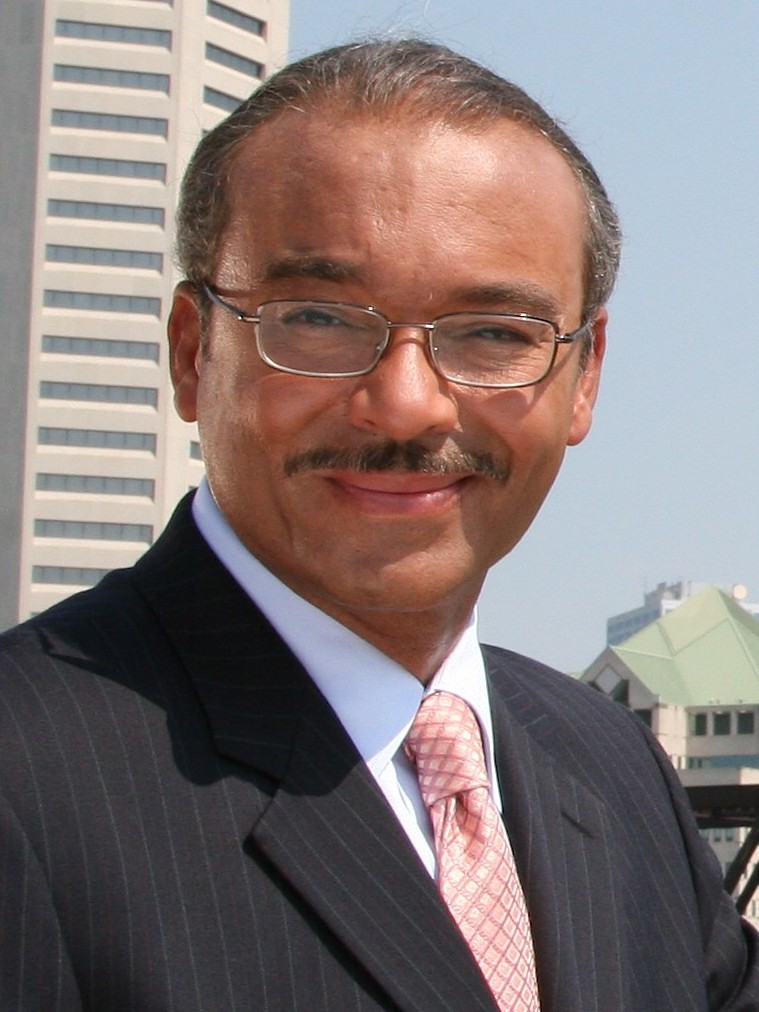

Candidate	Michael B. Coleman	Dorothy Teater
Party	Democratic	Republican
Popular vote	86,636	57,221
Percentage	60.06%	39.67%
Mayor before election
Greg Lashutka
Republican
Elected mayor
Michael B. Coleman
Democratic

The Columbus mayoral election of 1999 was the 81st mayoral election in Columbus, Ohio. It was held on Tuesday, November 2, 1999. Republican party incumbent mayor Greg Lashutka retired from office after two consecutive terms in office. Democratic party nominee Michael B. Coleman defeated Republican party nominee Dorothy Teater. Coleman became the first African American elected as mayor of Ohio's capital city.

== Primary results ==
Columbus mayoral primaries are officially nonpartisan, but candidates are frequently endorsed by the parties with which they are affiliated. The two candidates who receive the most votes in the primary advance to the general election.

1999 Columbus mayoral primary results
Party	Candidate	Votes	%
Nonpartisan	Michael B. Coleman	28,823	38.96
Nonpartisan	Dorothy Teater	27,498	37.17
Nonpartisan	Ben Espy	17,663	23.87
Total votes		73,984	100.0

== General election results ==
1999 Columbus mayoral election results
Party	Candidate	Votes	%
Nonpartisan	Michael B. Coleman	86,636	60.06
Nonpartisan	Dorothy Teater	57,221	37.17
Total votes		143,857	100.0

== Bibliography ==
- Caruso, Doug (December 31, 1999). "Coleman Promises Better Columbus". The Columbus Dispatch. The Dispatch Printing Company. p. 1A.
