= 1963 Columbus, Ohio mayoral election =

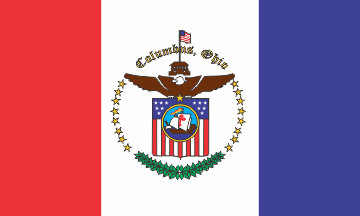
- November 5, 1963
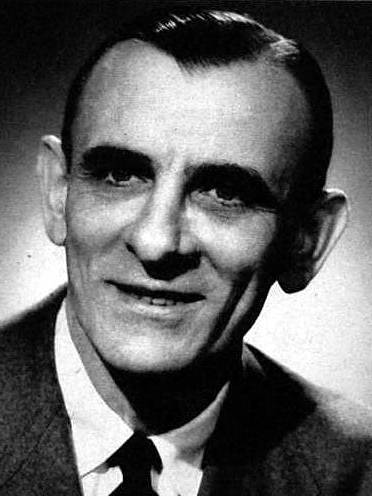

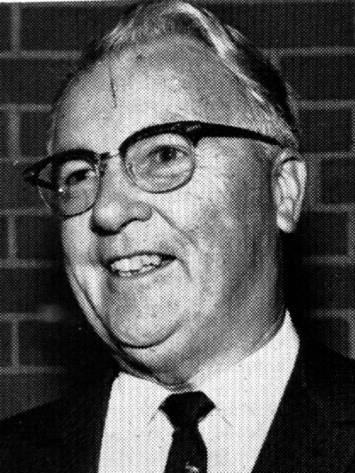
Candidate	Jack Sensenbrenner	Ralston Westlake
Party	Democratic	Republican
Mayor before election
Ralston Westlake
Republican
Elected mayor
Jack Sensenbrenner
Democratic

The Columbus mayoral election of 1963 was the 72nd mayoral election in Columbus, Ohio, United States. It was held on Tuesday, November 5, 1963. Incumbent Republican mayor Ralston Westlake was defeated by Democratic party nominee and former mayor Jack Sensenbrenner.
