= 1903 Columbus, Ohio mayoral election =

- April 4, 1903
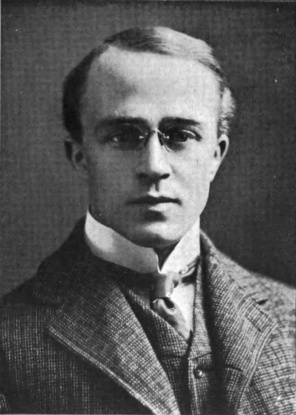

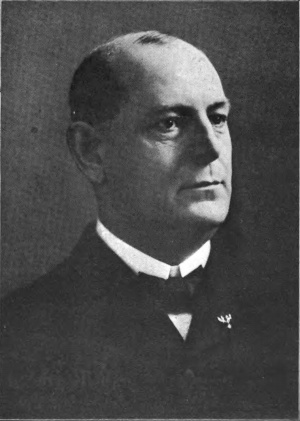
Candidate	Robert H. Jeffrey	John N. Hinkle
Party	Republican	Democratic
Mayor before election
John N. Hinkle
Democratic
Elected mayor
Robert H. Jeffrey
Republican

The Columbus mayoral election of 1903 was the 54th mayoral election in Columbus. It was held on Saturday, April 4, 1903. Democratic party incumbent mayor John N. Hinkle was defeated by Republican party nominee Robert H. Jeffrey.

== Bibliography ==
- "Columbus; Campaign Ends in Cleveland". The San Francisco Call. San Francisco, California: Chronicling America: Historic American Newspapers. Lib. of Congress. April 5, 1903. p. 25.
- "Mayor Hinkle Defeated". The Ohio Democrat. Logan, Ohio: Chronicling America: Historic American Newspapers. Library of Congress. April 9, 1903. p. 1, col. 4.
