= Floyd Green =

Floyd Green may refer to:

- Floyd F. Green (1899–1952), mayor of Columbus, Ohio
- Floyd Green (Jamaican politician) (born 20th-century), Jamaican government minister
