= Richard Pfeiffer =

Richard Pfeiffer may refer to:

- Richard Friedrich Johannes Pfeiffer (1858–1945), German physician and bacteriologist
- Richard Pfeiffer (politician) (born 1944), member of the Ohio Senate
