= William T. Martin (mayor) =

American politician (1788–1866)

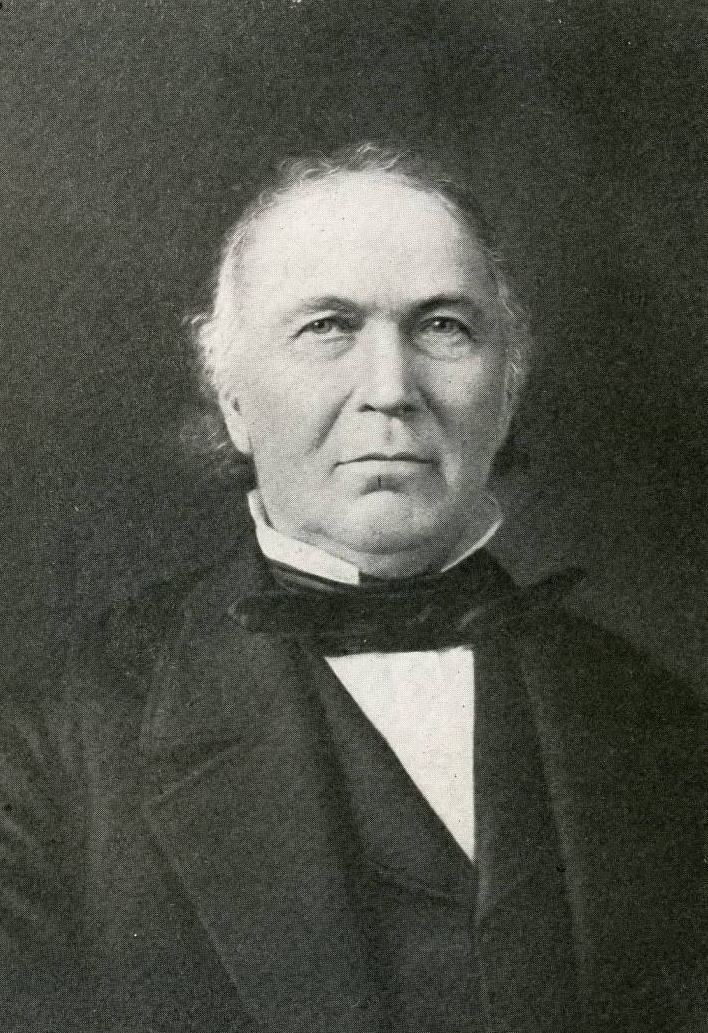

5th Mayor of Columbus
- In office 1824–1826
- Appointed by: Burough Council of Columbus
- Preceded by: John Laughrey
- Succeeded by: James Robinson

Personal details
- Born: April 6, 1788 Bedford County, Pennsylvania
- Died: February 19, 1866 (aged 77) Columbus, Ohio
- Resting place: Green Lawn Cemetery; Columbus, Ohio
- Spouse: Amelia
- Children: Benjamin Franklin
- Profession: Mayor; Judge; Writer; County recorder School board member Teacher; Justice of the Peace; Member of Burough Council

William T. Martin (April 6, 1788 – February 19, 1866) was an American politician who served as the fifth mayor of Columbus, Ohio. He was appointed by the Burough Council of Columbus in 1824 and served Columbus for three consecutive terms. His successor was Philo H. Olmsted. He died on February 19, 1866, and is interred in Green Lawn Cemetery.

== Works ==
- (1838) Franklin County Register
- (1858) History of Franklin County: A Collection of Reminiscences of the Early Settlement of the County; with Biographical Sketches and a Complete History of the County to the Present Time.

== Bibliography ==
- Egger, Charles, ed. (1975). Columbus Mayors (PDF). Columbus, Ohio: Columbus Citizen-Journal.
- Fitzpatrick, Stephen A.; Ulysses, Ulysses S. (1897). History of Columbus Celebration, Franklinton Centennial. New Franklin Printing Company.
- Lentz, Ed (August 19, 2013). "Martin legacy: Early Columbus history". ThisWeek Community News. Columbus, Ohio.
- "Martin, William T. (4/6 /1788-2/19/1866)". Columbus in Historic Photographs. Columbus, Ohio: Columbus Metropolitan Library.
- Martin, William T. (1858). History of Franklin County: A Collection of Reminiscences of the Early Settlement of the County; with Biographical Sketches and a Complete History of the County to the Present Time. Follett, Forster & Company.

Political offices
Preceded by John Laughrey	Mayor of Columbus, Ohio; 1824-1826	Succeeded by James Robinson
