= 1967 Columbus, Ohio mayoral election =

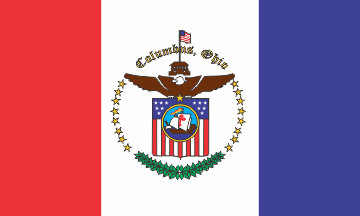
- November 7, 1967
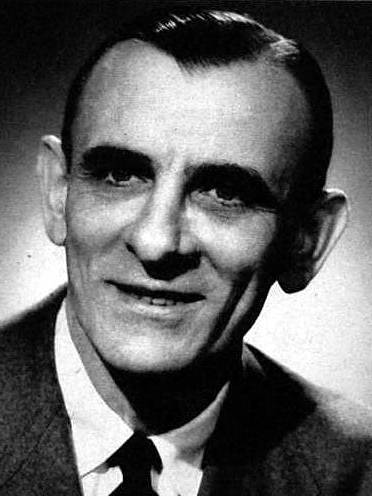

Candidate	Jack Sensenbrenner	Jerry Spears, Jr.
Party	Democratic	Republican
Mayor before election
Jack Sensenbrenner
Democratic
Elected mayor
Jack Sensenbrenner
Democratic

The Columbus mayoral election of 1967 was the 73rd mayoral election in Columbus, Ohio, United States. During the primary nomination on May 2, 1967, the Columbus electorate nominated Republican Jerry Spears, Jr., a businessman from the Hilltop neighborhood, and incumbent Democratic mayor Jack Sensenbrenner to compete in the mayoral election. On Tuesday, November 7, 1967, mayor Jack Sensenbrenner defeated Jerry Spears, Jr.
