= 1951 Columbus, Ohio mayoral election =

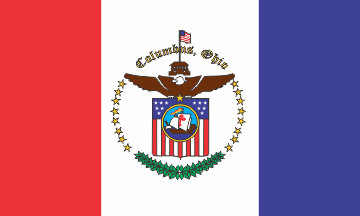
- November 6, 1951
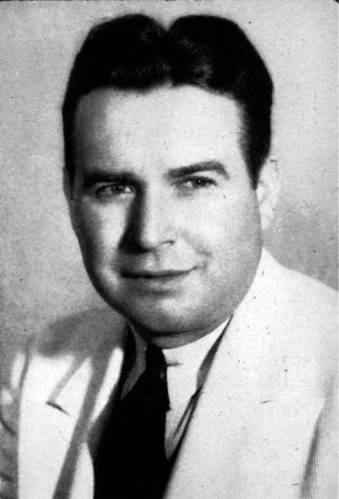

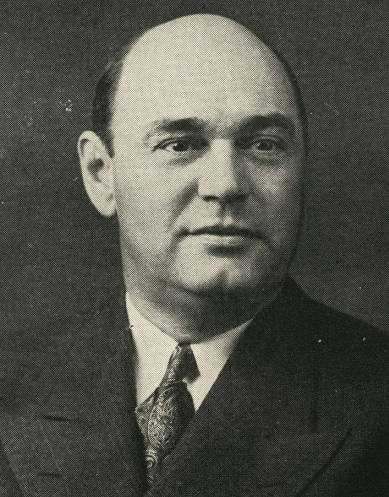
Candidate	Jim Rhodes	Floyd F. Green
Party	Republican	Republican
Popular vote	32,870	19,870
Mayor before election
Jim Rhodes
Republican
Elected mayor
Jim Rhodes
Republican

The Columbus mayoral election of 1951 was the 69th mayoral election in Columbus, Ohio. It was held on Tuesday, November 6, 1951. During the primary nomination on August 14, 1951, the Columbus electorate nominated two Republicans, incumbent mayor Jim Rhodes and former mayor Floyd F. Green, to compete in the general election. Incumbent mayor Rhodes defeated Green.

== Bibliography ==
- "Columbus Voters Name Rhodes; Ex-mayor Also Gets Nominated In Primary". Toledo Blade. Associated Press. August 15, 1951. pp. 3, col. 4.
- "Columbus Mayor Wins 3rd Term". Toledo Blade. November 7, 1951. pp. 3, col. 1.
