= 1971 Columbus, Ohio mayoral election =

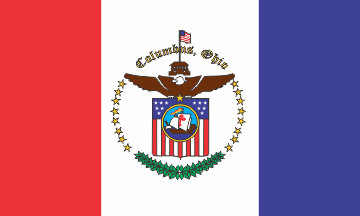
- November 2, 1971
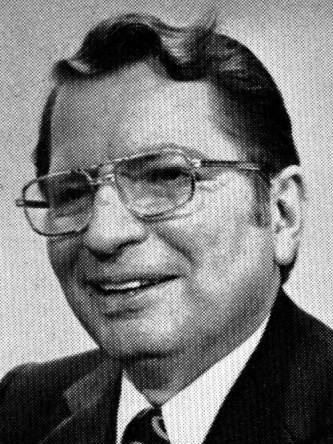

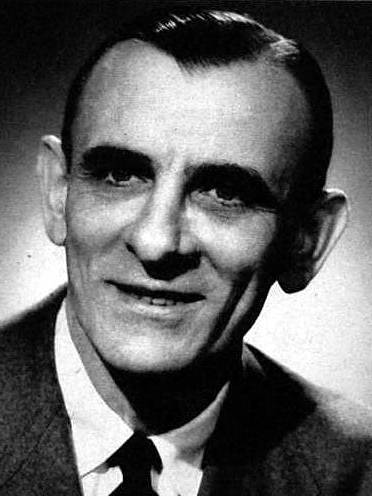
| Candidate | Tom Moody | Jack Sensenbrenner |
| Party | Republican | Democratic |
Mayor before election
Jack Sensenbrenner
Democratic
Elected mayor
Tom Moody
Republican

The Columbus mayoral election of 1971 was the 74th mayoral election in Columbus, Ohio. It was held on Tuesday, November 2, 1971. Incumbent Democratic mayor Jack Sensenbrenner was defeated by Republican party nominee Tom Moody.
