= 1905 Columbus, Ohio mayoral election =

- 1905
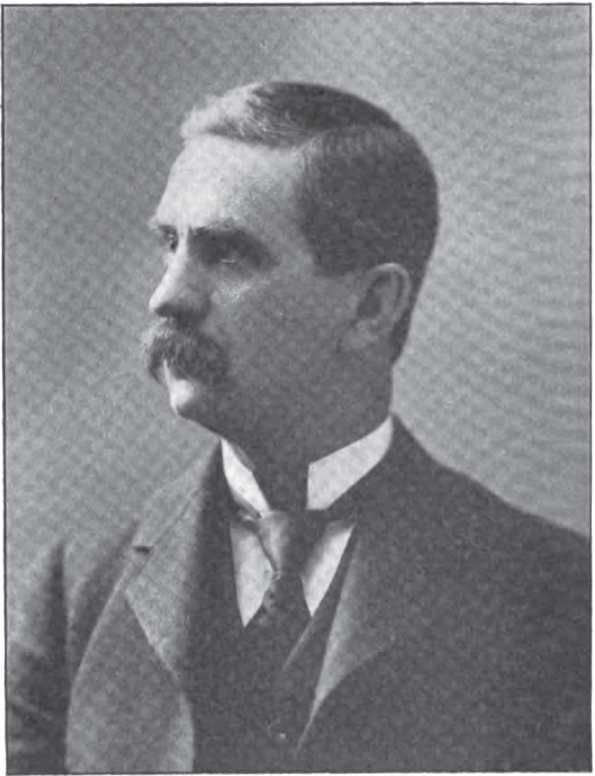

Candidate	De Witt C. Badger	Winfield Scott Potter
Party	Democratic	Republican
Mayor before election
Robert H. Jeffrey
Republican
Elected mayor
De Witt C. Badger
Democratic

The Columbus mayoral election of 1905 was the 55th mayoral election in Columbus, Ohio. Incumbent Republican mayor Robert H. Jeffrey retired from office after one term. Democratic party nominee De Witt C. Badger defeated Republican party nominee Winfield Scott Potter.

== Bibliography ==
- Columbus Police Benevolent Association (1908). History of the Police Department of Columbus, Ohio. Columbus, Ohio.
