= 1975 Columbus, Ohio mayoral election =

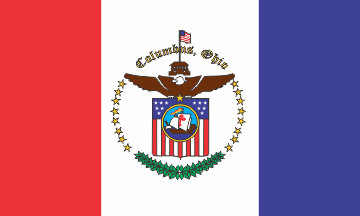
- November 4, 1975
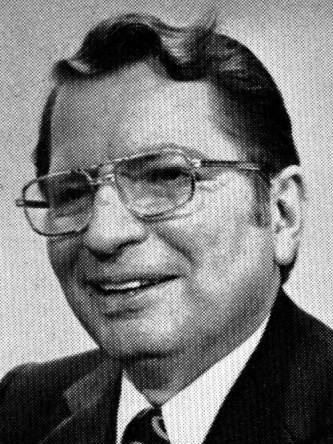

Candidate	Tom Moody	John Rosemond
Party	Republican	Democratic
Mayor before election
Tom Moody
Republican
Elected mayor
Tom Moody
Republican

The Columbus mayoral election of 1975 was the 75th mayoral election in Columbus, Ohio. It was held on Tuesday, November 4, 1975. Democratic party nominee John Rosemond was defeated by incumbent Republican mayor Tom Moody.
