= George Silas Peters =

American politician (1846–1928)

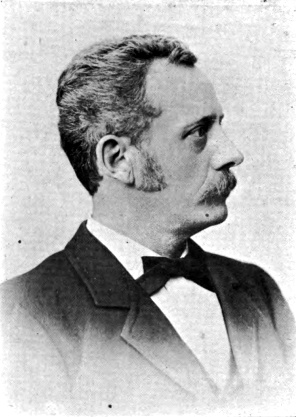

27th Mayor of Columbus
- In office 1881–1882
- Preceded by: Gilbert G. Collins
- Succeeded by: Charles C. Walcutt

Personal details
- Born: October 11, 1846 Pickaway County, Ohio
- Died: August 27, 1928 (aged 81) Columbus, Ohio
- Resting place: Green Lawn Cemetery; Columbus, Ohio
- Party: Democratic
- Profession: Attorney; Mayor

George Silas Peters (October 11, 1846 – August 27, 1928) was the 27th mayor of Columbus, Ohio and the 24th person to serve in that office. He served Columbus for one term. His successor, Charles C. Walcutt, took office in 1883. He died on August 27, 1928.

== Bibliography ==
- Egger, Charles, ed. (1975). Columbus Mayors (PDF). Columbus, Ohio: Columbus Citizen-Journal.

Political offices
Preceded by Gilbert G. Collins	Mayor of Columbus, Ohio; 1881–1882	Succeeded by Charles C. Walcutt
