= John Kerr (Ohio politician) =

American politician

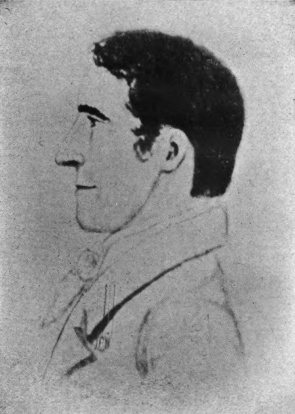

2nd Mayor of Columbus
- In office 1818–1820
- Appointed by: Burough Council of Columbus
- Preceded by: Jarvis W. Pike
- Succeeded by: Eli C. King

Personal details
- Born: 1778 Ireland
- Died: 1823 (aged 44–45)
- Profession: Mayor

John Kerr (1778–1823) was an Irish-born mayor of Columbus, Ohio in the United States. He was the second mayor of the capital city and served Columbus for over two terms. His successor was Eli C. King. He was buried in the North Graveyard.

== Bibliography ==
- Egger, Charles, ed. (1975). Columbus Mayors (PDF). Columbus, Ohio: Columbus Citizen-Journal.

Political offices
Preceded by Jarvis W. Pike	Mayor of Columbus, Ohio; 1818-1820	Succeeded by Eli C. King
