= Henry William Worley =

American mayor

41st Mayor of Columbus
- In office 1932–1935
- Preceded by: James J. Thomas
- Succeeded by: Myron B. Gessaman

Personal details
- Born: April 9, 1877 London, England
- Died: August 5, 1938 (aged 61)
- Party: Democratic

Henry William Worley (April 9, 1877 – August 5, 1938) was the 41st mayor of Columbus, Ohio and the 37th person to serve in that office. He was elected in 1931 and served Columbus during the rise of the New Deal programs during the presidency of Franklin Delano Roosevelt. After one term in office he was defeated in the 1935 mayoral election by Myron B. Gessaman.

== Bibliography ==
- Egger, Charles, ed. (1975). Columbus Mayors (PDF). Columbus: Columbus Citizen-Journal.

Political offices
Preceded by James J. Thomas	Mayor of Columbus, Ohio; 1932-1935	Succeeded by Myron B. Gessaman
