= George W. Meeker =

American politician

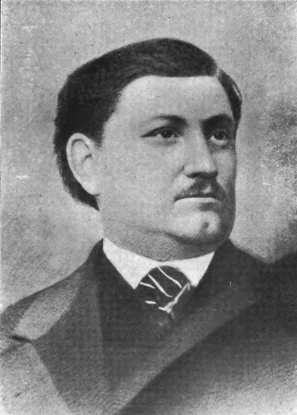

23rd Mayor of Columbus
- In office 1869–1870
- Preceded by: James G. Bull
- Succeeded by: James G. Bull

Personal details
- Born: 1833
- Died: 1890 (aged 56–57)
- Party: Democratic
- Spouse: Harriet Hatch
- Children: Claude; Garry W.
- Education: Otterbein College
- Profession: Mayor; Attorney; Justice of the Peace

George W. Meeker (1833–1890) was the 23rd mayor of Columbus, Ohio and the 21st person to serve in that office. He served Columbus for one term. His successor was James G. Bull after 1870. He died in 1890.

== Bibliography ==
- Egger, Charles, ed. (1975). Columbus Mayors (PDF). Columbus, Ohio: Columbus Citizen-Journal.

Political offices
Preceded by James G. Bull	Mayor of Columbus, Ohio; 1869–1870	Succeeded by James G. Bull
