= Sacha Pfeiffer =

American journalist (born 1971)

- Born: September 7, 1971 (age 54); Columbus, Ohio, U.S.
- Education: Boston University (BA, MA)
- Occupations: Public radio reporter/host, former newspaper reporter
- Spouse: Hansi Kalkofen
- Parent(s): Richard Pfeiffer; Janet Preskenis
- Awards: Goldsmith Prize for Investigative Reporting; Worth Bingham Prize; Investigative Reporters and Editors Award; Edward R. Murrow Award

Sacha Pfeiffer (born September 7, 1971) is an American Pulitzer Prize-winning investigative journalist and radio host. In November 2018, she joined NPR as an investigations correspondent.

Pfeiffer is known for her work with the Spotlight team run by The Boston Globe. Their stories on the Catholic Church's cover-up of clergy sex abuse earned the newspaper the 2003 Pulitzer Prize for Public Service.

== Personal life and career ==
Pfeiffer was born in Columbus, Ohio, the daughter of Janet (née Preskenis) and Richard Pfeiffer. She has a younger sister, Sonya, and a younger brother, Seth. Her father, a former state senator, was the city attorney for Columbus, Ohio, and her mother is a retired teacher. Her mother is of Lithuanian descent. Her grandmother was Alice Preskenis, a devout Catholic and a lifelong resident of South Boston who spent 40 years working at Pober's Clothing Store and specialized in dressing children. Her uncle was Ken Preskenis, a well-known figure in South Boston through his involvement in community outreach. Pfeiffer graduated from Bishop Watterson High School.

She left Ohio for college, moving to Boston. She graduated with a B.A. in liberal studies with a double major in English and history and M.A. from Boston University. In 2005, she was named a John S. Knight Journalism Fellow at Stanford University. She started her journalism career at the Dedham Times in Dedham, Massachusetts. Pfeiffer originally joined The Boston Globe as a reporter in 1995, left in 2008 to work for WBUR-FM in Boston and NPR, returning to The Boston Globe in 2014. During her nearly seven years in public radio, Pfeiffer was a local host of All Things Considered and Radio Boston at WBUR, as well as a guest host of NPR's nationally syndicated On Point and Here & Now. Her on-air work received a National Edward R. Murrow Award for broadcast reporting, as well as numerous other awards.

Pfeiffer wrote at The Boston Globe about wealth, philanthropy, and nonprofits and has also covered travel, legal affairs, and the Massachusetts state courts.

She volunteers as an English-as-second-language teacher.

After the Spotlight team published its work, the team created a book about the events. Pfeiffer is a co-author of Betrayal: The Crisis in the Catholic Church.

In November 2018, she joined NPR as an investigations correspondent and an occasional guest host for some of NPR's national shows.

== Portrayal in media ==
In the 2015 film Spotlight, Pfeiffer is portrayed by Canadian actress Rachel McAdams. McAdams was nominated for the Academy Award for Best Supporting Actress for her performance.
