= Robert T. Oestreicher =

American politician

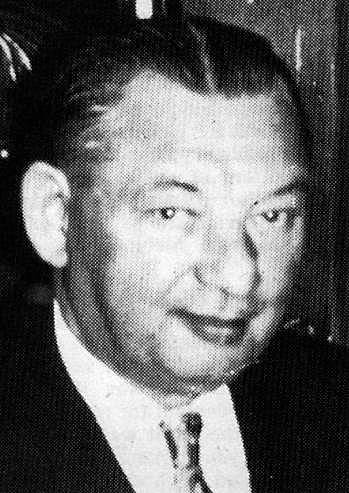

45th Mayor of Columbus
- In office January 1, 1953 – 1953
- Preceded by: Jim Rhodes
- Succeeded by: Jack Sensenbrenner

Personal details
- Born: February 28, 1894 Nelsonville, Ohio
- Died: February 18, 1955 (aged 60)
- Resting place: Green Lawn Cemetery; Columbus, Ohio
- Party: Republican
- Spouse(s): Arline; Jane
- Children: Robert; Michael; Lynne

Robert Theodore Oestreicher (February 28, 1894 – February 18, 1955) was an American politician of the Republican party from the U.S. state of Ohio. He was the 45th mayor of Columbus, Ohio and the 41st person to serve in that office.

== Career ==
Oestreicher was President of Columbus City Council in 1952 and succeeded to the office of mayor in 1953 after Jim Rhodes resigned his position to become Ohio State Auditor in 1952. During the municipal election of 1953, the electorate had to choose a mayoral candidate to complete the remainder of Rhodes' unexpired term. Oestreicher sought the office, but was opposed and defeated by Democratic party member Jack Sensenbrenner. Oestreicher served 11 months as mayor.

== Bibliography ==
- Egger, Charles, ed. (1975). Columbus Mayors (PDF). Columbus, Ohio: Columbus Citizen-Journal.

Political offices
Preceded by Jim Rhodes	Mayor of Columbus, Ohio; 1953-1953	Succeeded by Jack Sensenbrenner
