= Warren Jenkins =

American politician

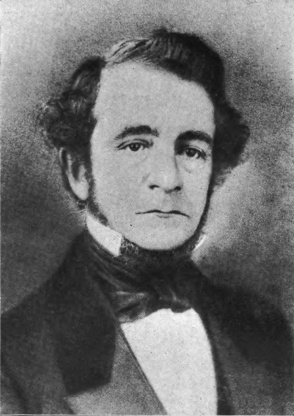

11th Mayor of Columbus
- In office 1836 – September 4, 1837
- Preceded by: John Bailhache
- Succeeded by: Philo H. Olmsted

Personal details
- Party: Whig
- Profession: Mayor; Justice of the Peace; Newspaper editor Bank cashier

Warren Jenkins was the 11th mayor of Columbus, Ohio. He resigned his office as mayor on September 4, 1837 to become a bank cashier at the Mechanics Savings Institute. His successor after 1837 was Philo H. Olmsted.

== Bibliography ==
- Egger, Charles, ed. (1975). Columbus Mayors (PDF). Columbus, Ohio: Columbus Citizen-Journal.

Political offices
Preceded by John Bailhache	Mayor of Columbus, Ohio; 1836–1837	Succeeded by Philo H. Olmsted
