= Myron B. Gessaman =

American politician (1894–1975)

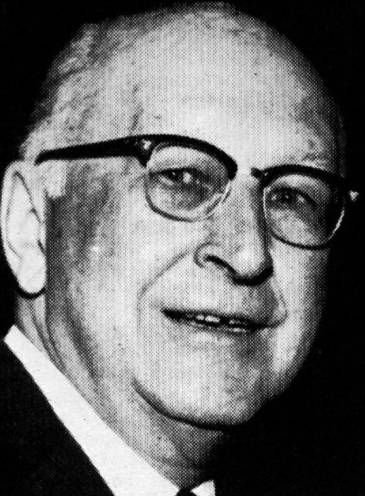

42nd Mayor of Columbus
- In office 1936–1939
- Preceded by: Henry W. Worley
- Succeeded by: Floyd F. Green

Member of the Ohio House of Representatives
- In office 1933–1935

Personal details
- Born: October 15, 1894 Youngstown, Ohio
- Died: August 20, 1975 (aged 80) Columbus, Ohio
- Resting place: Union Cemetery; Columbus, Ohio
- Party: Republican
- Spouse: Marie C. Sommer
- Children: Ann; David G. Richard
- Education: Rayen High School
- Alma mater: Western Reserve University
- Profession: Mayor; judge; legislator; attorney

Military service
- Allegiance: United States of America
- Branch/service: United States Army
- Battles/wars: World War I

Myron Bierdeman Gessaman (October 15, 1894 – August 20, 1975) was a Republican politician from the U.S. state of Ohio and a veteran of the United States Army during World War I. He served as mayor of Columbus, a prosecutor and judge of Franklin County, and as a member and floor leader of the Ohio House of Representatives.

== Biography ==
Gessaman was born October 15, 1894, in Youngstown, Mahoning County, Ohio. His parents were George D. and Frances L. Gessaman. He received his education through the public schools in Youngstown and graduated from Rayen High School. While enrolled at Western Reserve University he enlisted into the United States Army when the United States entered World War I. He served in the U.S. Army Ambulance Service and transported wounded individuals from the Battle of Saint-Mihiel and the Meuse-Argonne Offensive to hospitals. During the First Armistice at Compiègne, Gessaman stayed behind for evacuation duty, then served in Germany with the Army of Occupation. After returning home, he resumed his course work at Western Reserve University towards a law degree.

He was admitted to the Ohio bar in 1919. After graduating from Reserve Law School in 1920, he worked briefly for the private law firm of F. Stanley Crooks. Afterwards, he worked as the assistant City Attorney for Columbus (1923–1928), assistant Franklin County prosecutor (1928–1931), was elected to the Ohio House of Representatives (1933–1935), and served as majority floor leader while a state legislator in 1935.

During 1935, the Republicans of Columbus selected him as their candidate to run for mayor. He won the 1935 mayoral election defeating incumbent Democratic mayor Henry W. Worley. Gessaman became the 42nd mayor of Columbus, Ohio, the 38th person to serve in that office, and served Columbus during the Great Depression. After one term in office he was defeated in the 1939 mayoral election by Republican opponent Floyd F. Green. After his defeat for reelection as mayor, he was later elected as a judge to the Franklin County Common Pleas Court in 1943. He served as judge for 30 years.

He married Marie C. Sommer in 1922 and had three children - Ann, David G., and Richard. His youngest son Richard was killed in Korea in 1954. Two years after his retirement from the Franklin County Common Pleas Court he died on August 20, 1975. He is interred at Union Cemetery in Columbus, Ohio.

== Further reading and viewing ==
- "Gessaman, Myron B. (10/15/1894-8/20/1975)". Columbus in Historic Photographs. Columbus. Ohio: Columbus Metropolitan Library.
- ""Continue Progressive Developments In Columbus," campaign postcard". Columbus in Historic Photographs. Columbus. Ohio: Columbus Metropolitan Library.
- ""Gessaman's Record," campaign pamphlet". Columbus in Historic Photographs. Columbus. Ohio: Columbus Metropolitan Library.
- "Sample Municipal Non-Partisan 1935 Primaries Ballot". Columbus in Historic Photographs. Columbus. Ohio: Columbus Metropolitan Library.
- ""Vote for These Republican Candidates," campaign literature". Columbus in Historic Photographs. Columbus. Ohio: Columbus Metropolitan Library.
- ""Vote for Myron B. Gessaman," campaign literature for Ohio House of Representative seat". Columbus in Historic Photographs. Columbus. Ohio: Columbus Metropolitan Library.
- ""Vote for Myron B. Gessaman," campaign literature for Mayor's office". Columbus in Historic Photographs. Columbus. Ohio: Columbus Metropolitan Library.
- "Images of Myron B. Gessaman at Photohio.org". Photohio.org. Grandview Heights Public Library.

Political offices
Preceded by Henry W. Worley	Mayor of Columbus, Ohio; 1936-1939	Succeeded by Floyd F. Green
