= John Bailhache =

American politician

Member of the Illinois House of Representatives from Madison County
- In office 1842–1843

10th Mayor of Columbus
- In office 1835–1835
- Preceded by: John Brooks
- Succeeded by: Warren Jenkins

Member of the Ohio House of Representatives from Ross County
- In office 1820–1820

Personal details
- Born: May 8, 1787 Saint Ouen, Isle of Jersey
- Died: September 3, 1857 (aged 70) Alton, Illinois, US
- Party: Whig
- Spouse: Mary Elizabeth Heath
- Children: William; Preston; Arthur
- Profession: Mayor; Newspaper editor State legislator Judge

John Bailhache (May 8, 1787 – September 3, 1857) was the 10th mayor of Columbus, Ohio. The Columbus City Council appointed him to complete the remaining two-year term of John Brooks after he resigned his office on April 21, 1835. His successor after 1836 was Warren Jenkins.

== Bibliography ==
- Egger, Charles, ed. (1975). Columbus Mayors (PDF). Columbus, Ohio: Columbus Citizen-Journal.

Political offices
Preceded by John Brooks	Mayor of Columbus, Ohio; 1835–1835	Succeeded by Warren Jenkins
