= Ralston Westlake =

American politician

Wallace Ralston Westlake
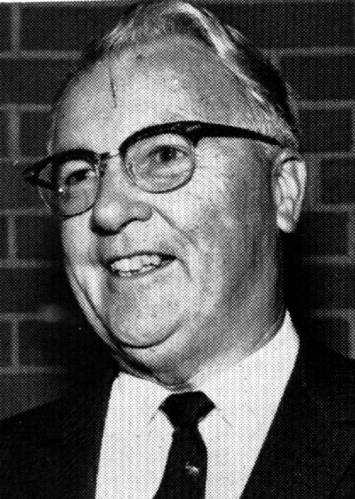

47th Mayor of Columbus
- In office January 1, 1960 – January 1, 1964
- Preceded by: Jack Sensenbrenner
- Succeeded by: Jack Sensenbrenner

Personal details
- Born: August 27, 1907 Columbus, Ohio, US
- Died: December 9, 1978 (aged 71) Columbus, Ohio, US
- Resting place: Green Lawn Cemetery; Columbus, Ohio
- Party: Republican
- Spouse: Helen Elizabeth Siegwald
- Education: West High School
- Profession: Mayor; Glassware businessman Motel owner City Council Member

Military service
- Allegiance: United States
- Branch/service: United States Army
- Battles/wars: World War II

Wallace Ralston Westlake (August 27, 1907 – December 9, 1978) was an American politician of the Republican Party from the U.S. state of Ohio. He was the 47th mayor of Columbus, Ohio and the 43rd person to serve in that office. He served one term in office until he lost re-election in the 1963 mayoral election by former mayor Jack Sensenbrenner.

He served in the US Army during World War II, was a member of the Lutheran Church, the Freemasons and the Shriners. He was born in the Hilltop neighborhood in Columbus on South Highland Avenue and lived in that area throughout his life. As an adult, he lived in a two-story home located at 3300 West Broad Street, where he also owned a small motel and glass business for many years. The property was later sold, and the vacant land behind it was converted to self-storage units, and the motel units were converted to small offices. He died on December 9, 1978.

== Bibliography ==
- Egger, Charles, ed. (1975). Columbus Mayors (PDF). Columbus, Ohio: Columbus Citizen-Journal.

Political offices
Preceded by Jack Sensenbrenner	Mayor of Columbus, Ohio; 1960-1964	Succeeded by Jack Sensenbrenner
