= John H. Heitmann =

American politician (1842–1894)

John Henry Heitmann
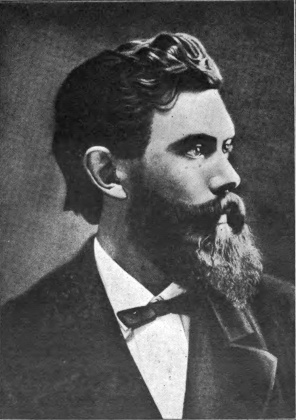

25th Mayor of Columbus
- In office 1875–1878
- Preceded by: James G. Bull
- Succeeded by: Gilbert G. Collins

Member of the Ohio House of Representatives
- In office 1874–1876

Personal details
- Born: September 11, 1842 Hanover, Germany
- Died: March 26, 1894 (aged 51)
- Party: Democratic
- Spouse: Ottilie Petterly
- Children: Albert H.
- Profession: Teacher; Attorney; State Legislator; Mayor

John Henry Heitmann (September 11, 1842 – March 26, 1894) was the 25th mayor of Columbus, Ohio and the 22nd person to serve in that office. He served Columbus for two terms. His successor, Gilbert G. Collins, took office in 1879. He died on March 26, 1894.

== Bibliography ==
- Egger, Charles, ed. (1975). Columbus Mayors (PDF). Columbus, Ohio: Columbus Citizen-Journal.
- "Heitmann, John Henry (9/11/1842-3/26/1894)". Columbus in Historic Photographs. Columbus, Ohio: Columbus Metropolitan Library.

Political offices
Preceded by James G. Bull	Mayor of Columbus, Ohio; 1875–1878	Succeeded by Gilbert G. Collins
