= William Long (mayor) =

American politician

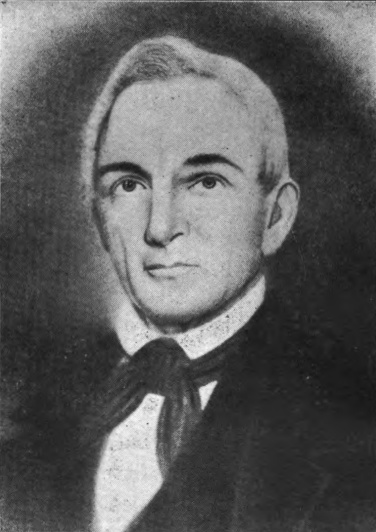

7th Mayor of Columbus
- In office 1827–1833
- Appointed by: Burough Council of Columbus
- Preceded by: James Robinson
- Succeeded by: Philo H. Olmsted

Personal details
- Born: January 24, 1781
- Died: February 22, 1851 (aged 70)
- Spouse: Rebekah Morrison Suddick
- Profession: Mayor; Member of Burough Council; County treasurer

William Long (January 24, 1781 – February 22, 1851) was the seventh mayor of Columbus, Ohio. He served Columbus for over five terms. His successor was Philo H. Olmsted. He died on February 22, 1851.

== Bibliography ==
- Egger, Charles, ed. (1975). Columbus Mayors (PDF). Columbus, Ohio: Columbus Citizen-Journal.
- "Long, William (1/24/1781-2/22/1851)". Columbus in Historic Photographs. Columbus, Ohio: Columbus Metropolitan Library.

Political offices
Preceded by James Robinson	Mayor of Columbus, Ohio; 1827-1833	Succeeded by Philo H. Olmsted
