= Ben Espy =

American politician (1943–2025)

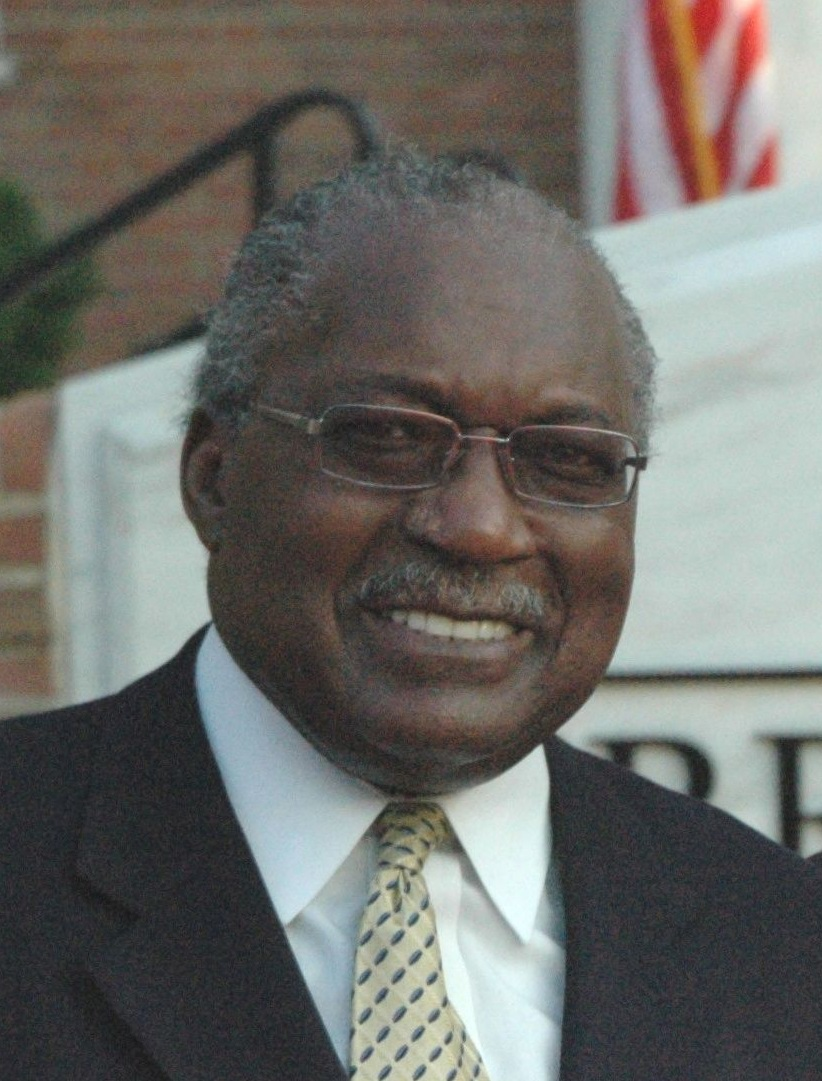
- Espy in 2007

Member of the Ohio Senate from the 15th district
- In office April 21, 1992 – December 31, 2002
- Preceded by: Richard Pfeiffer
- Succeeded by: Ray Miller

Personal details
- Born: July 12, 1943 Nashville, Tennessee, U.S.
- Died: January 4, 2025 (aged 81) Columbus, Ohio, U.S.
- Party: Democratic
- Spouse: Kathy Duffy
- Children: 4
- Education: Howard University; Ohio State University; Sandusky High School

Bennie Eugene Espy (July 12, 1943 – January 4, 2025) was an American Democratic politician who served in the Ohio Senate. A member of Columbus City Council from 1982 to 1992, Espy went on to obtain an appointment to the Ohio Senate after Senator Richard Pfeiffer resigned in 1992. He won election to fill the remainder of the term in 1992, and to a full term in 1994. In 1984, during his time on the Columbus City Council, Espy was struck by a falling cornice from an aging building, which caused his right leg to be severed below the knee.

By 1994, Espy was chosen to serve as assistant Senate minority leader, and by 1996, he was minority leader. He won a second term in 1998.

In 1999, Espy challenged Columbus Mayor Michael Coleman in the primary for mayor, but lost. He subsequently resigned his minority leader post, and served the remainder of his term in the Senate as a lame duck. Term limited in 2002, he left office and was replaced by Ray Miller.

Espy returned to private law practice, and also went on to serve as a special counsel to the Ohio Attorney General Marc Dann. He resided in Columbus, Ohio, and was a Prince Hall Freemason.

Espy died in Columbus on January 4, 2025, at the age of 81.

== See also ==
- Columbus, Ohio mayoral election, 1991
