= Jarvis W. Pike =

American politician

1st Mayor of Columbus
- In office 1816–1817
- Appointed by: Burough Council of Columbus
- Preceded by: Inaugural holder
- Succeeded by: John Kerr

Personal details
- Born: 1795
- Died: September 12, 1854 (aged 58–59)
- Resting place: Union Grove Cemetery; Canal Winchester, Ohio
- Spouse: Elleanor Moore
- Profession: Mayor

Jarvis W. Pike (1795–September 12, 1854) was the first mayor of Columbus, Ohio.

Pike died September 12, 1854. He was buried in a private or family graveyard. He was later reinterred at Union Grove Cemetery located at Canal Winchester, Ohio.

== Bibliography ==
- Egger, Charles, ed. (1975). Columbus Mayors (PDF). Columbus, Ohio: Columbus Citizen-Journal.

Political offices
| Preceded by Inaugural holder | Mayor of Columbus, Ohio; 1816-1817 | Succeeded by John Kerr |
