= Cotton Hayden Allen =

American politician

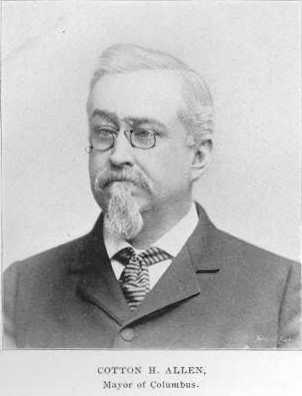

31st Mayor of Columbus
- In office 1895–1896
- Preceded by: George J. Karb
- Succeeded by: Samuel L. Black

Personal details
- Born: 1834 Auburn, New York
- Died: January 26, 1900 (aged 65–66)
- Party: Democratic
- Profession: Mayor; Businessman

Cotton Hayden Allen (1834–January 26, 1900) was the 31st mayor of Columbus, Ohio and the 28th person to serve in that office. He served Columbus for one term. His successor, Samuel L. Black, took office in 1897. He died in 1900.

== Bibliography ==
- Egger, Charles, ed. (1975). Columbus Mayors (PDF). Columbus, Ohio: Columbus Citizen-Journal.

Political offices
| Preceded by George J. Karb | Mayor of Columbus, Ohio; 1895-1896 | Succeeded by Samuel L. Black |
