= James G. Bull =

American politician (1838–1927)

James Gilbrugh Bull
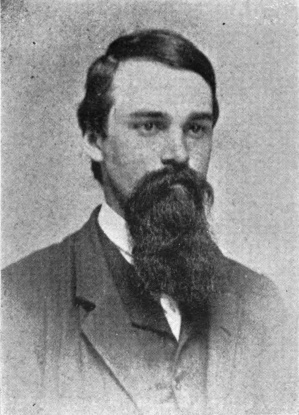

22nd and 24th Mayor of Columbus
- In office 1871–1874
- Preceded by: George W. Meeker
- Succeeded by: John H. Heitmann
- In office 1865–1868
- Preceded by: Wray Thomas
- Succeeded by: George W. Meeker

Personal details
- Born: 1838 Ohio
- Died: November 2, 1927 (aged 88–89)
- Party: Democratic
- Spouse: Laura Brelsford
- Children: Richard; Harry; Nanny
- Education: Ohio Wesleyan University
- Profession: Mayor

James Gilbrugh Bull (1838 – November 2, 1927) was the 24th mayor and 22nd mayor of Columbus, Ohio. He was also the 20th person to serve in that office. He served Columbus for eight years during four non-consecutive terms. His successor after 1870 was George W. Meeker and after 1874 was John H. Heitmann. He died November 2, 1927.

== Bibliography ==
- Egger, Charles, ed. (1975). Columbus Mayors (PDF). Columbus, Ohio: Columbus Citizen-Journal.

Political offices
Preceded by George W. Meeker	Mayor of Columbus, Ohio; 1871–1874	Succeeded by John H. Heitmann
Preceded by Wray Thomas	Mayor of Columbus, Ohio; 1865–1868	Succeeded by George W. Meeker
