= 2023 Columbus, Ohio mayoral election =

- November 7, 2023
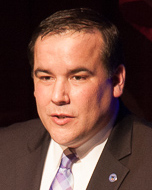

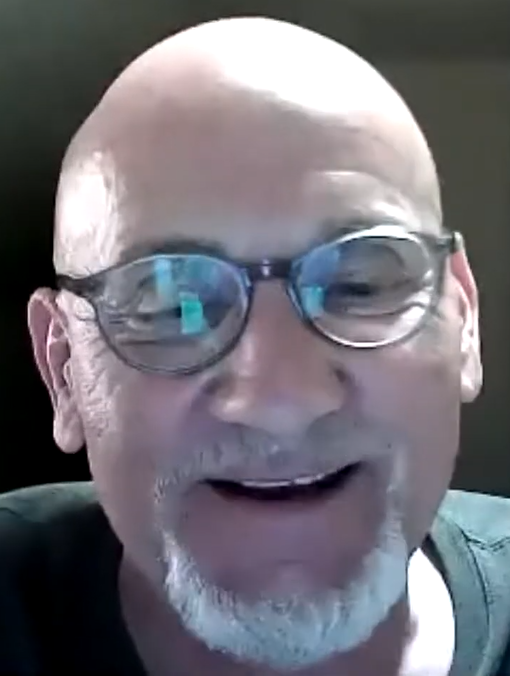
Candidate	Andrew Ginther	Joe Motil
Party	Nonpartisan	Nonpartisan
Alliance	Democratic	Democratic
Popular vote	137,475	76,989
Percentage	63.4%	35.5%
Mayor before election
Andrew Ginther
Democratic
Elected mayor
Andrew Ginther
Democratic

The 2023 Columbus mayoral election took place on November 7, 2023, to elect the mayor of Columbus, Ohio. Incumbent Democratic mayor Andrew Ginther was re-elected to a third term in office. A primary election would have been held in May, but because only two candidates qualified for the race, both advanced directly to the November general election. Two write-in candidates were later certified to the general election ballot. Mayoral elections in Columbus are officially non-partisan but candidates are often endorsed by their parties.

== Candidates ==
=== Declared ===
- Andrew Ginther, incumbent mayor (Party affiliation: Democratic)
- Carrie Griffin (write-in) (Party affiliation: Republican) (Note: Griffin was initially disqualified from the primary election after submitting only 566 of the required 1,000 valid signatures on her nomination petitions. However, she was later certified to the general election as a write-in candidate.)
- Joe Motil, community activist (Party affiliation: Democratic) (Note: Motil was denied endorsement by the Franklin County Democratic Party for lack of adequate campaign resources including funding.)
- Allison Willford, realtor (write-in) (Party affiliation: Independent)

=== Withdrawn ===
- Tom Sussi, private investigator and former investigative reporter (write-in) (Party affiliation: Independent)

== Results ==
2023 Columbus mayoral election
Party	Candidate	Votes	%
Nonpartisan	Andrew Ginther (incumbent)	137,475	63.4
Nonpartisan	Joe Motil	76,989	35.5
Nonpartisan	Carrie Griffin (write-in)	512	0.2
Nonpartisan	Allison Willford (write-in)	310	0.1
Write-in	Other write-ins (Note: Write-ins for individuals who were not certified as candidates by the Franklin County Board of Elections.)	1,552	0.7
Total votes		216,838	100.0
