= Thomas Wood (mayor) =

American politician

14th Mayor of Columbus
- In office May 1841 – 1841
- Preceded by: John G. Miller
- Succeeded by: Abram I. McDowell

Personal details
- Born: 1782
- Died: 1861 (aged 78–79)
- Profession: Mayor; Justice of the Peace; Magistrate; Bank President; Board of Directors Member

Thomas Wood (1792–1861) was the 14th mayor of Columbus, Ohio. He was also the 13th person to serve in that office. He was appointed by the City Council to serve the remainder of mayor John G. Miller's unfinished term. He served Columbus for one year. His successor after 1841 was Abram I. McDowell.

== Bibliography ==
- Egger, Charles, ed. (1975). Columbus Mayors (PDF). Columbus, Ohio: Columbus Citizen-Journal.

Political offices
Preceded by John G. Miller	Mayor of Columbus, Ohio; 1841–1841	Succeeded by Abram I. McDowell
