= Eli C. King =

American politician

3rd Mayor of Columbus
- In office 1820–1822
- Appointed by: Burough Council of Columbus
- Preceded by: John Kerr
- Succeeded by: John Laughrey

Personal details
- Profession: Mayor; Tanor; Justice of the Peace

Eli C. King was an American politician who was the third mayor of Columbus, Ohio. He served Columbus for three terms. His successor was John Laughrey.

== Bibliography ==
- Egger, Charles, ed. (1975). Columbus Mayors (PDF). Columbus, Ohio: Columbus Citizen-Journal.

Political offices
Preceded by John Kerr	Mayor of Columbus, Ohio; 1820-1822	Succeeded by John Laughrey
