= Dave Karmol =

American politician

Member of the Ohio House of Representatives from the 44th district
- In office May 1979 – December 31, 1982
- Preceded by: Irma Karmol
- Succeeded by: District relocated

Personal details
- Born: 1952 or 1953 (age 73–74)
- Party: Republican

Dave L. Karmol is a former member of the Ohio House of Representatives. He was appointed to fill the seat of his mother Irma Karmol, following her death in April 1979. He was elected for a full term in November 1980.
