= Gilbert G. Collins =

American politician

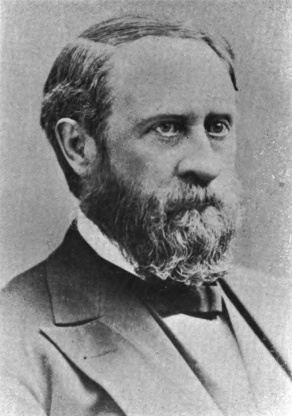

26th Mayor of Columbus
- In office 1879–1880
- Preceded by: John H. Heitmann
- Succeeded by: George S. Peters

Personal details
- Born: July 10, 1830 Essex County, New Jersey
- Died: 1885 (aged 54–55)
- Profession: Teacher; Attorney; City Attorney; Mayor; Real Estate Developer; Businessman

Gilbert G. Collins (1830–1885) was the 26th mayor of Columbus, Ohio and the 23rd person to serve in that office. He served Columbus for one term. His successor, George S. Peters, took office in 1881. He died in 1885.

== Bibliography ==
- The Biographical Encyclopœdia of Ohio of the Nineteenth Century. Cincinnati and Philadelphia: Galaxy Publishing Company. 1876.
- Egger, Charles, ed. (1975). Columbus Mayors (PDF). Columbus, Ohio: Columbus Citizen-Journal.

Political offices
Preceded by John H. Heitmann	Mayor of Columbus, Ohio; 1879–1880	Succeeded by George S. Peters
