= Samuel Luccock Black =

American politician (1859–1929)

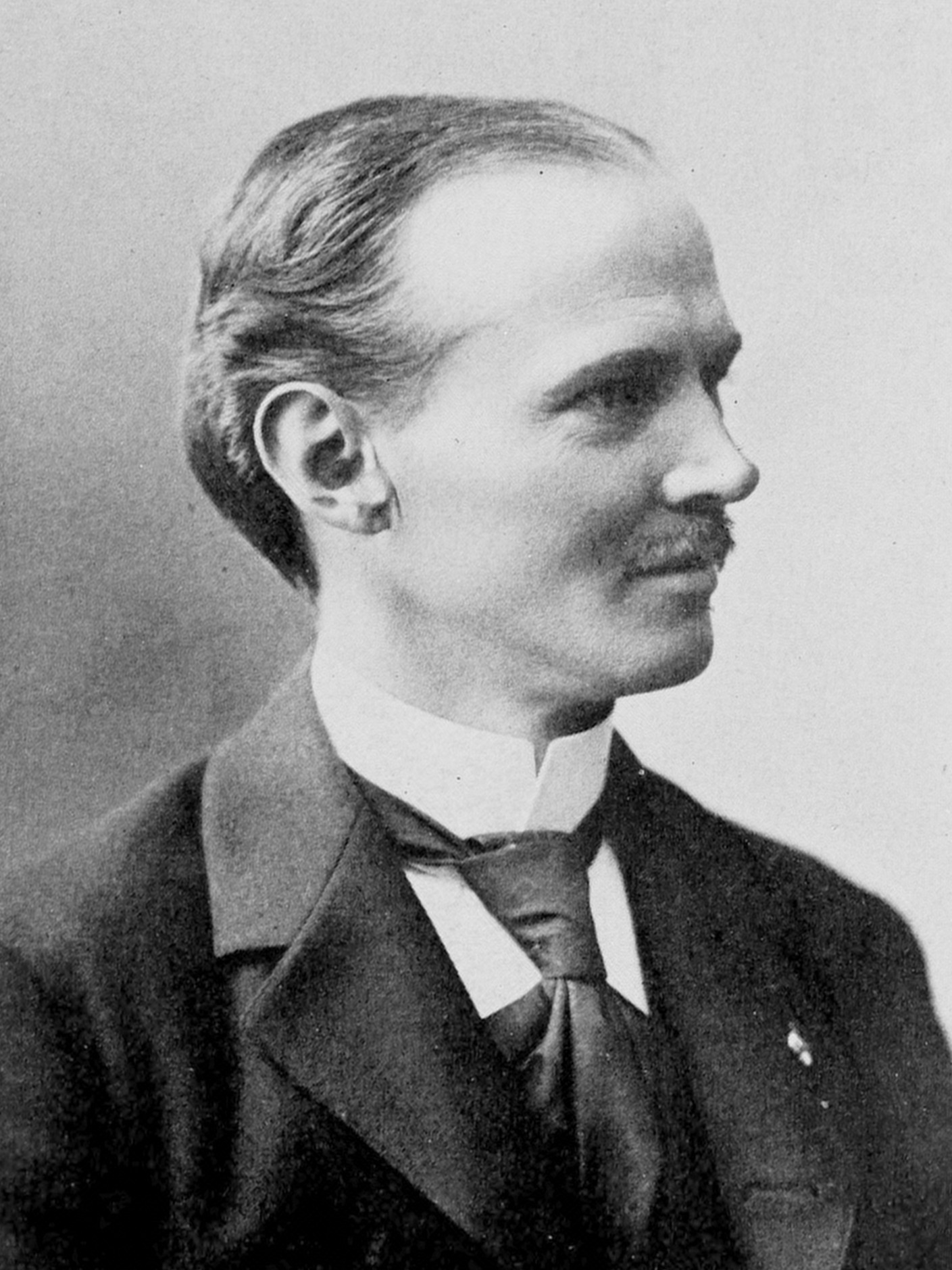

32nd Mayor of Columbus
- In office 1897–1898
- Preceded by: Cotton H. Allen
- Succeeded by: Samuel J. Swartz

Personal details
- Born: December 22, 1859 Kimbolton, Guernsey County, Ohio
- Died: June 18, 1929 (aged 69)
- Resting place: Green Lawn Cemetery; Columbus, Ohio
- Party: Democratic
- Spouse: Catherine Nelson Black
- Education: Ohio Wesleyan University
- Profession: Lawyer; Probate Judge; Mayor

Samuel Luccock Black (December 22, 1859 – June 18, 1929) was a Democratic politician from the U.S. state of Ohio who served as 32nd Mayor of Columbus, Ohio, for one two-year period and was later a judge.

== Biography ==
Samuel Luccock Black was born December 22, 1859, in Kimbolton, Guernsey County, Ohio. His parents were William Black and Marie Luccock. He graduated at the public schools of Cambridge, Ohio, in 1878, and Ohio Wesleyan University in 1883. He studied law and was admitted to the bar in 1887.

Black moved to Columbus, Ohio, immediately after admission to the bar and set up practice with Powell, Owen, Ricketts, and Black. He continued private practice until elected a judge. He first ran for office in 1896 for Probate Judge of Franklin County, but lost to Tod B. Galloway. He ran for Mayor of Columbus and defeated Republican Emmett Tompkins in the spring of 1897. While he was mayor, the Union Station was completed, the municipal electric light plant and West Side levee (on the Scioto River) were completed, and the water system was improved. He ran for re-election in the mayoral election of 1899, but was defeated by Republican Samuel J. Swartz.

Black was elected Probate Judge of Franklin County November 1902, and was seated February, 1903. He later transferred to a newly created Juvenile Court. He retired and resumed private practice in 1917.

Black died June 18, 1929, and is interred at Green Lawn Cemetery, Columbus, Ohio.

Political offices
Preceded by Cotton Hayden Allen	Mayor of Columbus, Ohio; 1897-1898	Succeeded by Samuel Jackson Swartz
