= John Guerrant Miller =

American politician

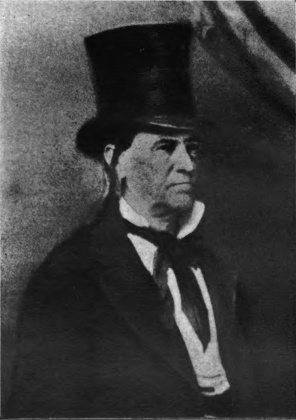

13th Mayor of Columbus
- In office 1840 – May 4, 1841
- Preceded by: Philo H. Olmsted
- Succeeded by: Thomas Wood

Personal details
- Born: 1795 Goochland County, Virginia
- Died: 1871 (aged 75–76)
- Party: Whig
- Spouse(s): Christian Tyler; Otis Crosby
- Children: John G.
- Education: College of William & Mary
- Profession: Mayor; Newspaper operator Attorney; Postmaster; Judge; Gas Company Director; Justice of the Peace

John Guerrant Miller (1795–1871) was the 13th mayor of Columbus, Ohio. He was the 12th person to serve in that office. He resigned his office as mayor on May 4, 1841, to become postmaster in Columbus. He served Columbus as mayor for 13 months. His successor after 1841 was Thomas Wood.

== Bibliography ==
- Egger, Charles, ed. (1975). Columbus Mayors (PDF). Columbus, Ohio: Columbus Citizen-Journal.

Political offices
Preceded by Philo H. Olmsted	Mayor of Columbus, Ohio; 1840–1841	Succeeded by Thomas Wood
