= Wray Thomas =

American politician

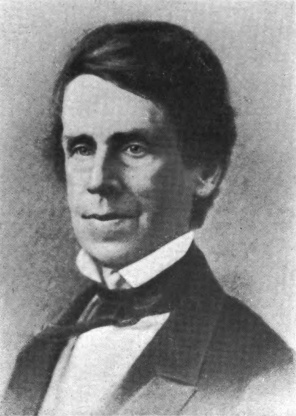

21st Mayor of Columbus
- In office 1861–1864
- Preceded by: Lorenzo English
- Succeeded by: James G. Bull

Member of the Ohio House of Representatives
- In office 1850–1851

Personal details
- Born: June 15, 1810 Richmond, Virginia
- Died: October 16, 1883 (aged 73)
- Party: Peace Democrat
- Education: University of Virginia
- Profession: Mayor; Attorney

Wray Thomas (June 15, 1810 – October 16, 1883) was the 21st mayor of Columbus, Ohio and the 19th person to serve in that office. He served Columbus during the American Civil War for two terms. His successor was James G. Bull after 1864.

== Bibliography ==
- Egger, Charles, ed. (1975). Columbus Mayors (PDF). Columbus, Ohio: Columbus Citizen-Journal.

Political offices
Preceded by Lorenzo English	Mayor of Columbus, Ohio; 1861–1864	Succeeded by James G. Bull
