= John Laughrey =

American politician

4th Mayor of Columbus
- In office 1823–1823
- Appointed by: Burough Council of Columbus
- Preceded by: Eli C. King
- Succeeded by: William T. Martin

Personal details
- Born: 1784
- Died: Unknown
- Profession: Mayor

John Laughrey (born 1784) was an American politician who served as the fourth mayor of Columbus, Ohio. He served Columbus for one term. His successor was William T. Martin.

== Bibliography ==
- Egger, Charles, ed. (1975). Columbus Mayors (PDF). Columbus, Ohio: Columbus Citizen-Journal.

Political offices
Preceded by Eli C. King	Mayor of Columbus, Ohio; 1823-1823	Succeeded by William T. Martin
