= Irma Karmol =

American politician (1923–1979)

Member of the Ohio House of Representatives from the 44th district
- In office January 3, 1975- April 24, 1979
- Preceded by: Richard L. Wittenberg
- Succeeded by: Dave Karmol

Personal details
- Born: April 23, 1923
- Died: April 24, 1979 (aged 56)
- Party: Republican

Irma Karmol (April 13, 1923 – April 24, 1979) was a member of the Ohio House of Representatives. She was elected in November 1974, and died in office on April 24, 1979, in a car accident on her way to Columbus, Ohio, the state capitol.
