= James Robinson (Ohio politician) =

American mayor

6th Mayor of Columbus
- In office 1827 – September 11, 1827
- Appointed by: Burough Council of Columbus
- Preceded by: William T. Martin
- Succeeded by: William Long

Personal details
- Profession: Mayor; Member of Burough Council; Tavern operator Inn operator President of toll road company

James Robinson was the sixth mayor of Columbus, Ohio. He served Columbus for eight months. He is the shortest-serving former mayor of Columbus, Ohio. His successor was William Long.

== Bibliography ==
- Egger, Charles, ed. (1975). Columbus Mayors (PDF). Columbus, Ohio: Columbus Citizen-Journal.

Political offices
Preceded by William T. Martin	Mayor of Columbus, Ohio; 1827-1827	Succeeded by William Long
