= John Brooks (mayor) =

American politician

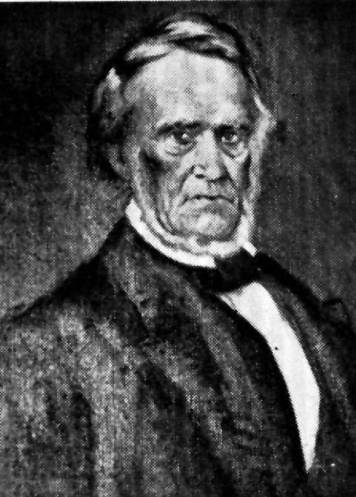

9th Mayor of Columbus
- In office April 21, 1834 – April 21, 1835
- Preceded by: Philo H. Olmsted
- Succeeded by: John Bailhache

Personal details
- Born: June 13, 1785 Lincolnville, Maine
- Died: February 19, 1869 (aged 83) Columbus, Ohio, U.S.
- Resting place: Green Lawn Cemetery; Columbus, Ohio
- Spouse: Phoebe Perkins
- Profession: Mayor; Merchant; Justice of the Peace

John Brooks (June 13, 1785 – February 19, 1869) was the ninth mayor of Columbus, Ohio. He was the first mayor elected by popular vote in the City of Columbus on April 14, 1834. He was elected to a two-year term, but only served for one year. He resigned from office on April 21, 1835. John Bailhache was appointed by city council to complete the unexpired term of Brooks's tenure.

== Bibliography ==
- Egger, Charles, ed. (1975). Columbus Mayors (PDF). Columbus: Columbus Citizen-Journal.

Political offices
Preceded by Philo H. Olmsted	Mayor of Columbus, Ohio; 1834-1835	Succeeded by John Bailhache
