= Robert H. Jeffrey =

Former mayor of Columbus, Ohio

Robert Hutchins Jeffrey
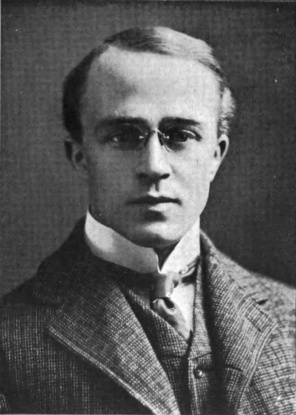

35th Mayor of Columbus
- In office May 4, 1903 – January 1, 1906
- Preceded by: John N. Hinkle
- Succeeded by: De Witt C. Badger

Personal details
- Born: December 21, 1873
- Died: October 22, 1961 (aged 87) Columbus, Ohio, US
- Resting place: Green Lawn Cemetery; Columbus, Ohio
- Party: Republican
- Education: Williams College
- Profession: Mayor; General Manager; Chairman

Robert Hutchins Jeffrey (December 21, 1873 – October 22, 1961) was the 35th mayor of Columbus, Ohio and the 32nd person to serve in that office. He was elected April 4, 1903. He served Columbus for one term and an additional eight months. The Ohio General Assembly changed Ohio election times from the spring season to the fall season during his tenure in office. His successor, De Witt C. Badger, took office on January 1, 1906. He died on October 22, 1961.

== Bibliography ==
- Columbus Police Benevolent Association (1908). History of the Police Department of Columbus, Ohio. Columbus, Ohio.
- Egger, Charles, ed. (1975). Columbus Mayors (PDF). Columbus, Ohio: Columbus Citizen-Journal.
- "Columbus; Campaign Ends in Cleveland". The San Francisco Call. San Francisco, California: Chronicling America: Historic American Newspapers. Library of Congress. April 5, 1903. p. 25, col. 4.
- "Jeffrey, Robert H (12/21/1873-10/23/1961)". Columbus in Historic Photographs. Columbus, Ohio: Columbus Metropolitan Library.

Political offices
Preceded by John N. Hinkle	Mayor of Columbus, Ohio; 1903-1905	Succeeded by De Witt C. Badger
