= Tom Moody (politician) =

American politician

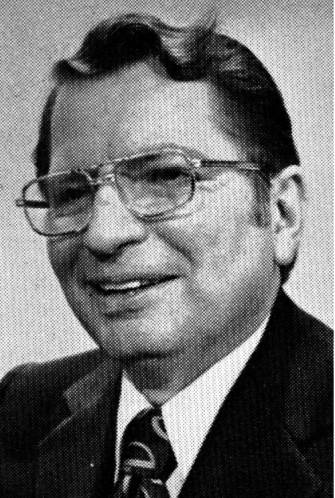

49th Mayor of Columbus
- In office January 1, 1972 – January 1, 1984
- Preceded by: Jack Sensenbrenner
- Succeeded by: Buck Rinehart

52nd President of the National League of Cities
- In office 1978
- Preceded by: Phyllis Lamphere
- Succeeded by: Jessie M. Rattley

Personal details
- Born: November 26, 1929 Columbus, Ohio, U.S.
- Died: October 30, 2008 (aged 78) Columbus, Ohio, U.S.
- Party: Republican
- Education: South High School
- Alma mater: Capital University Law School; Franklin University; Ohio State University
- Profession: Judge; City Council Member; Special Agent; Counter Intelligence Corps; Mayor

Tom Moody (November 26, 1929 – October 30, 2008) was the 49th mayor of Columbus, Ohio. A Republican, he served from 1972 to 1984. During his time in office, the Columbus Public School District was desegregated and the city's freeway system underwent significant expansion. The downtown skyline also grew during Moody's time in office. The city saw development of the Huntington Center, One Nationwide Plaza and the AEP Building. During his term, he was involved in a late night vehicle crash. Responding to suspicion that he was driving under the influence, Moody stated "I'm inspecting the city". In 1978, he served as president of the National League of Cities. Moody died at the age of 78, on October 30, 2008, of natural causes, at Riverside Hospital.

Political offices
Preceded by Jack Sensenbrenner	Mayor of Columbus, Ohio; 1972–1984	Succeeded by Buck Rinehart
