= Philo H. Olmsted =

American politician

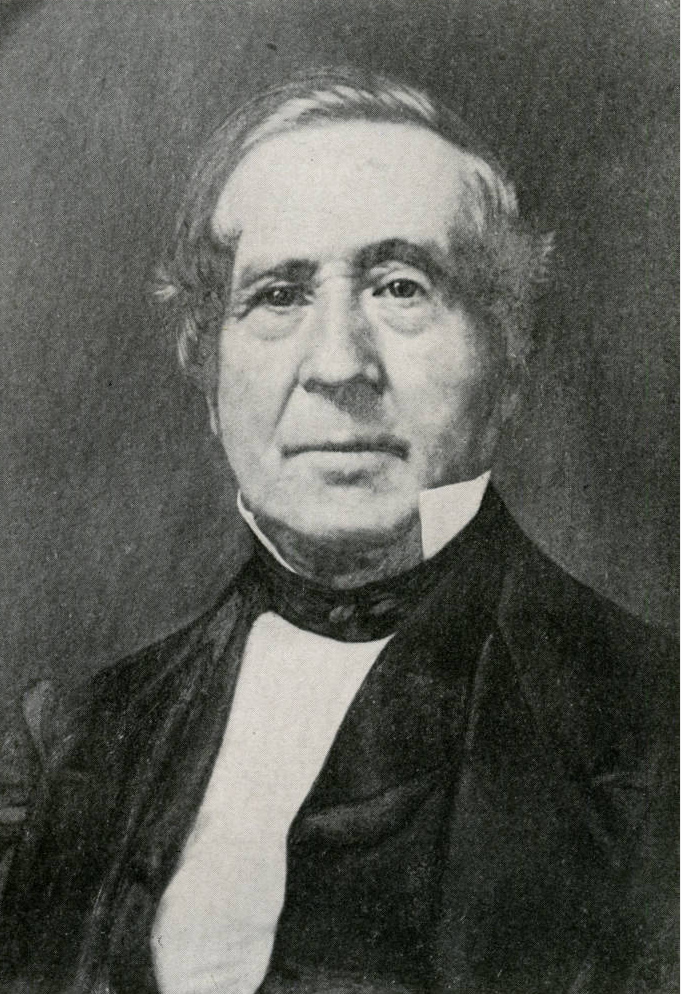

8th and 12th Mayor of Columbus
- In office 1838–1839
- Preceded by: Warren Jenkins
- Succeeded by: John G. Miller
- In office 1833–1833
- Appointed by: Columbus Burough Council
- Preceded by: William Long
- Succeeded by: John Brooks

Personal details
- Born: February 26, 1793 Simsbury, Connecticut, US
- Died: February 20, 1870 (aged 76) Columbus, Ohio, US
- Resting place: Green Lawn Cemetery, Columbus, Ohio
- Party: Whig
- Spouse: Sarah Phillips
- Children: 12
- Profession: Mayor; Newspaper editor Tavern owner Hotel manager Retailer; Member of Burough Council; Member of the Ohio House of Representatives

Philo Hopkins Olmsted (February 26, 1793 – February 20, 1870) was the eighth mayor and 12th mayor of Columbus, Ohio. He was also the eighth person to serve in that office. He served Columbus for three years during non-consecutive terms. His successor after 1833 was John Brooks and after 1839 was John G. Miller.

== Bibliography ==
- Egger, Charles, ed. (1975). Columbus Mayors (PDF). Columbus, Ohio: Columbus Citizen-Journal.
- History of Columbus, Franklin County, Ohio: Pictorial and Biographical. S.J. Clark. 1909.

Political offices
Preceded by Warren Jenkins	Mayor of Columbus, Ohio; 1838–1839	Succeeded by John G. Miller
Preceded by William Long	Mayor of Columbus, Ohio; 1833–1833	Succeeded by John Brooks
