= Richard L. Wittenberg =

American politician

Member of the Ohio House of Representatives from the 44th district
- In office 1973–1974
- Preceded by: Donald Fraser
- Succeeded by: Irma Karmol

Personal details
- Party: Democratic

Richard L. Wittenberg is an American politician. He served as a Democratic member for the 44th district of the Ohio House of Representatives.

== Life and career ==
Wittenberg was a school teacher.

Wittenberg served in the Ohio House of Representatives from 1973 to 1974.
