= John Nelson Hinkle =

34th mayor of Columbus, Ohio

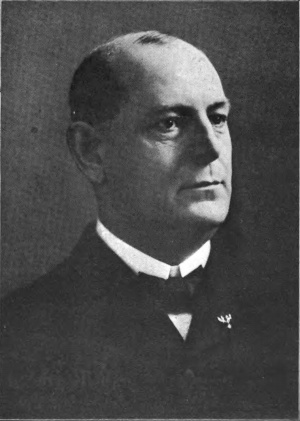

34th Mayor of Columbus
- In office 1901 – May 4, 1903
- Preceded by: Samuel J. Swartz
- Succeeded by: Robert H. Jeffrey

Personal details
- Born: January 11, 1854
- Died: October 25, 1905 (aged 51)
- Resting place: Green Lawn Cemetery; Columbus, Ohio
- Party: Democratic
- Spouse: Samantha
- Profession: Mayor; Soap Maker

John Nelson Hinkle (January 11, 1854 – October 25, 1905) was the 34th mayor of Columbus, Ohio and the 31st person to serve in that office. He was elected on April 1, 1901 and served Columbus for one term. He sought re-election for a second term. The opposing candidate, Republican nominee Robert H. Jeffrey, defeated incumbent mayor Hinkle. Jeffrey took office on May 4, 1903. He died on October 25, 1905.

== Bibliography ==
- "Columbus; Campaign Ends in Cleveland". The San Francisco Call. San Francisco, California: Chronicling America: Historic American Newspapers. Lib. of Congress. April 5, 1903. p. 25.
- Columbus Police Benevolent Association (1908). History of the Police Department of Columbus, Ohio. Columbus, Ohio.
- Egger, Charles, ed. (1975). Columbus Mayors (PDF). Columbus, Ohio: Columbus Citizen-Journal.
- "Hinkle, John N (1854-10/25/1905)". Columbus in Historic Photographs. Columbus. Ohio: Columbus Metropolitan Library.
- "Mayor Hinkle Defeated". The Ohio Democrat. Logan, Ohio: Chronicling America: Historic American Newspapers. Library of Congress. April 9, 1903. p. 1, col. 4.

Political offices
| Preceded by Samuel J. Swartz | Mayor of Columbus, Ohio; 1901-1902 | Succeeded by Robert H. Jeffrey |
