= Richard Pfeiffer (politician) =

American politician

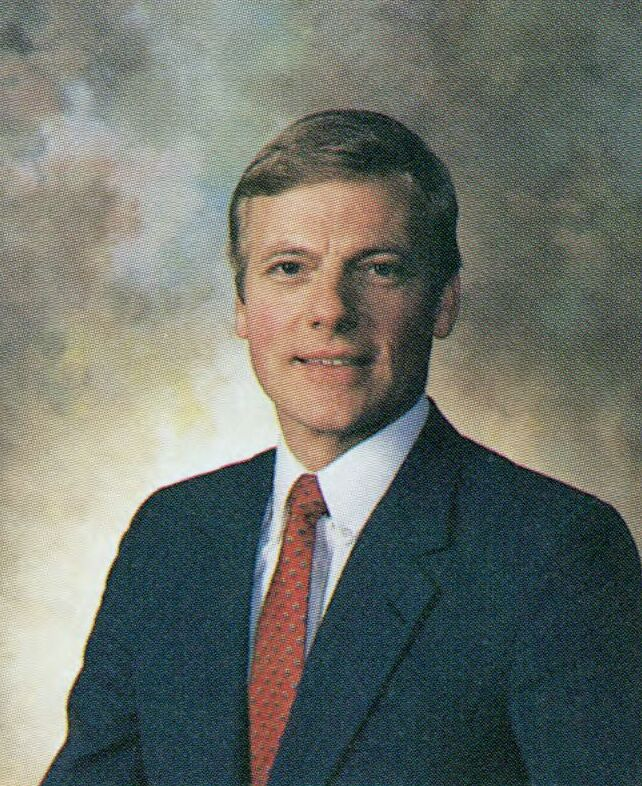

Member of the Ohio Senate from the 15th district
- In office January 3, 1983 – March 31, 1992
- Preceded by: John Chickasaw
- Succeeded by: Ben Espy

Personal details
- Born: April 12, 1944 (age 82) Fort Jackson, South Carolina, U.S.
- Party: Democratic
- Spouse: Janet Preskenis
- Children: 3, including Sacha Pfeiffer

Richard "Rick" Pfeiffer, Jr. (born April 12, 1944) is a Democratic politician and a former member of the Ohio Senate. He served as the city attorney of Columbus, Ohio from 2003 to 2017.

== Life and career ==
Born in Fort Jackson, South Carolina, Pfeiffer was raised in Columbus, Ohio. He is the son of Marie (née Stoll) and Richard Pfeiffer.

An attorney, Pfeiffer initially won an open seat in the Senate in 1982, succeeding Republican John Kasich, who won election to the United States Congress.

In 1986, Pfeiffer was mentioned as a potential running mate to Richard Celeste. However, the spot ultimately went to Paul Leonard. Pfeiffer subsequently won reelection to the Senate, and again won reelection in 1990.

Pfeiffer won election as judge of the Franklin County Environmental Court in 1992, and as a result, resigned from the Senate. He was succeeded by Ben Espy. He served on the bench until 2003, when he became Columbus city attorney. Pfeiffer was included as a judge in the documentary Flag Wars which examined "the collision between African-American homeowners and gay, white interlopers", according to a report in the Boston Globe.

In December 2016, Pfeiffer announced he would not seek re-election as Columbus city attorney after his term expiring on December 31, 2017. City Council president Zach Klein sought and won the office in the November 2017 general election.

== Personal life ==
Pfeiffer is married to Janet Preskenis; his children include journalist Sacha Pfeiffer, Sonya Pfeiffer, and Seth Pfeiffer.
