= Samuel Jackson Swartz =

Former mayor of Columbus, Ohio

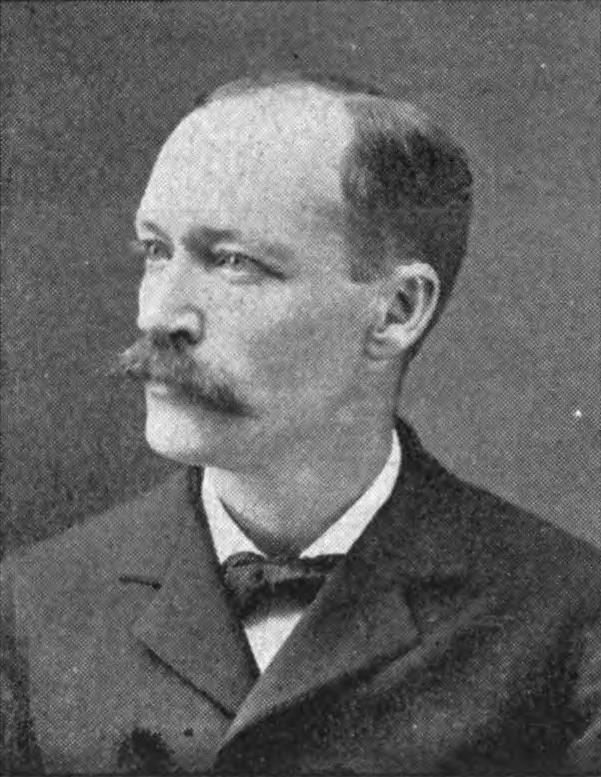

33rd Mayor of Columbus
- In office 1899–1900
- Preceded by: Samuel L. Black
- Succeeded by: John N. Hinkle

Personal details
- Born: February 8, 1859 Fairfield County, Ohio
- Died: March 25, 1905 (aged 46)
- Resting place: Green Lawn Cemetery; Columbus, Ohio
- Party: Republican
- Education: Pleasantville Academy; Fairfield Union Academy; Ohio Wesleyan University
- Profession: Mayor; Attorney; Traveling Salesman; Police Judge

Samuel Jackson Swartz (February 8, 1859 – March 25, 1905) was the 33rd mayor of Columbus, Ohio and the 30th person to serve in that office. He served Columbus for one term. His successor, John N. Hinkle, took office in 1901.

== Bibliography ==
- Egger, Charles, ed. (1975). Columbus Mayors (PDF). Columbus, Ohio: Columbus Citizen-Journal.

Political offices
Preceded by Samuel L. Black	Mayor of Columbus, Ohio; 1899-1900	Succeeded by John N. Hinkle
