= Mayor of Columbus, Ohio =

Mayor of Columbus
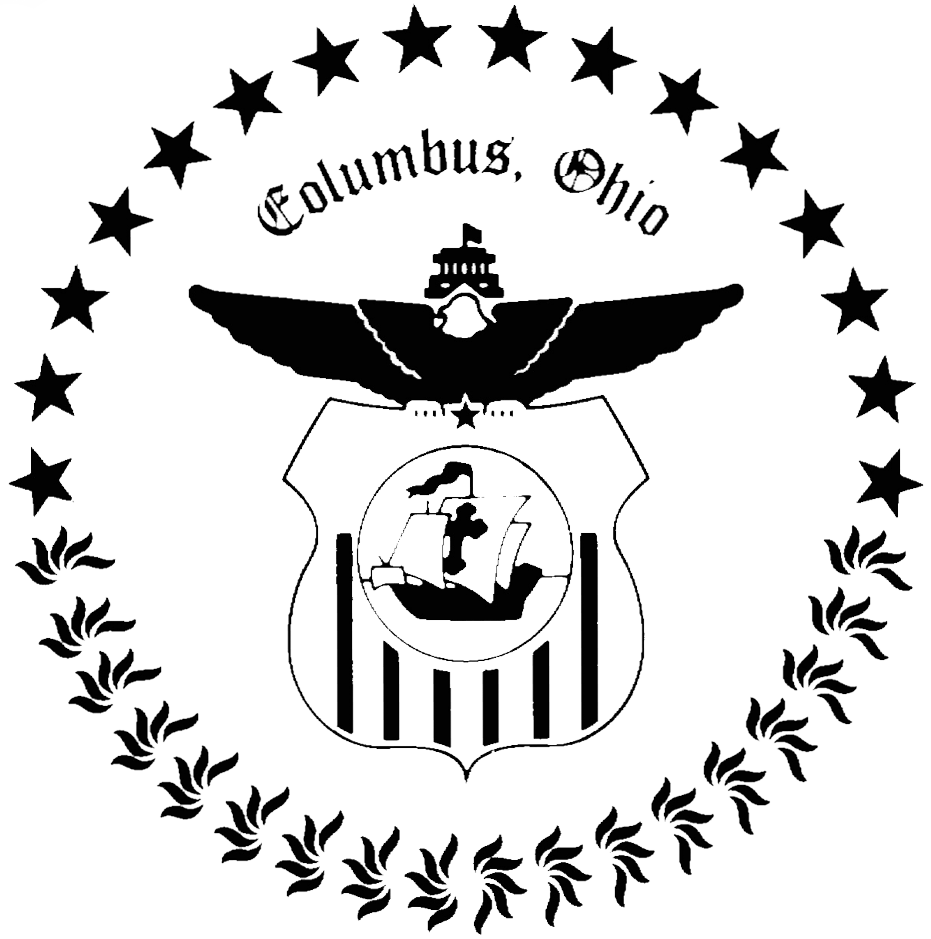
- Seal of the City of Columbus

- Flag of the City of Columbus

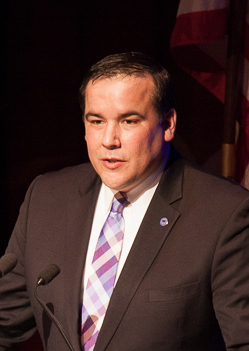
- Incumbent; Andrew Ginther since January 1, 2016
- Style: The Honorable
- Term length: Four-year term, no limits
- Inaugural holder: Jarvis W. Pike
- Formation: February 14, 1812
- Deputy: President of Columbus City Council
- Salary: $177,000 (2016)
- Website: mayor.columbus.gov

There have been 48 individuals that have served as mayor of Columbus, Ohio, serving 53 distinct mayoralties or consecutive terms in office. The first mayor of Columbus was Jarvis W. Pike. He was appointed by the Burough Council of Columbus in 1816. The first mayor of Columbus to be elected by popular vote was John Brooks in 1834. Five mayors have served non-consecutive terms. Philo H. Olmsted is counted as both the 8th and 12th mayor, Alexander Patton as both the 17th and 19th mayor, James G. Bull as both the 22nd and 24th mayor, George J. Karb as both the 30th and 39th mayor, and Jack Sensenbrenner as both the 46th and 48th mayor. Of the individuals appointed or elected as mayor, five have resigned from office - James Robinson, John Brooks, Warren Jenkins, John G. Miller, and Jim Rhodes. No mayor has died or become permanently disabled while in office. The shortest-serving former mayor is James Robinson, who served only eight months before resigning from office on September 11, 1827. The longest-serving mayor is Michael B. Coleman, who served 16 years and is the only African American to serve as mayor. Andrew Ginther is the current mayor. He took office on January 1, 2016.

== Mayors of Columbus ==
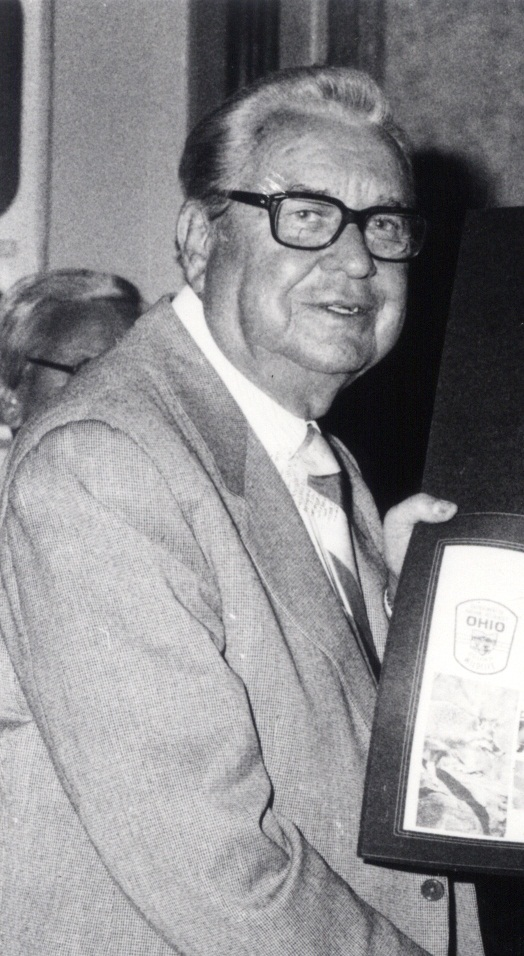
Jim Rhodes, 44th mayor of Columbus, and only former mayor to serve as Governor of Ohio

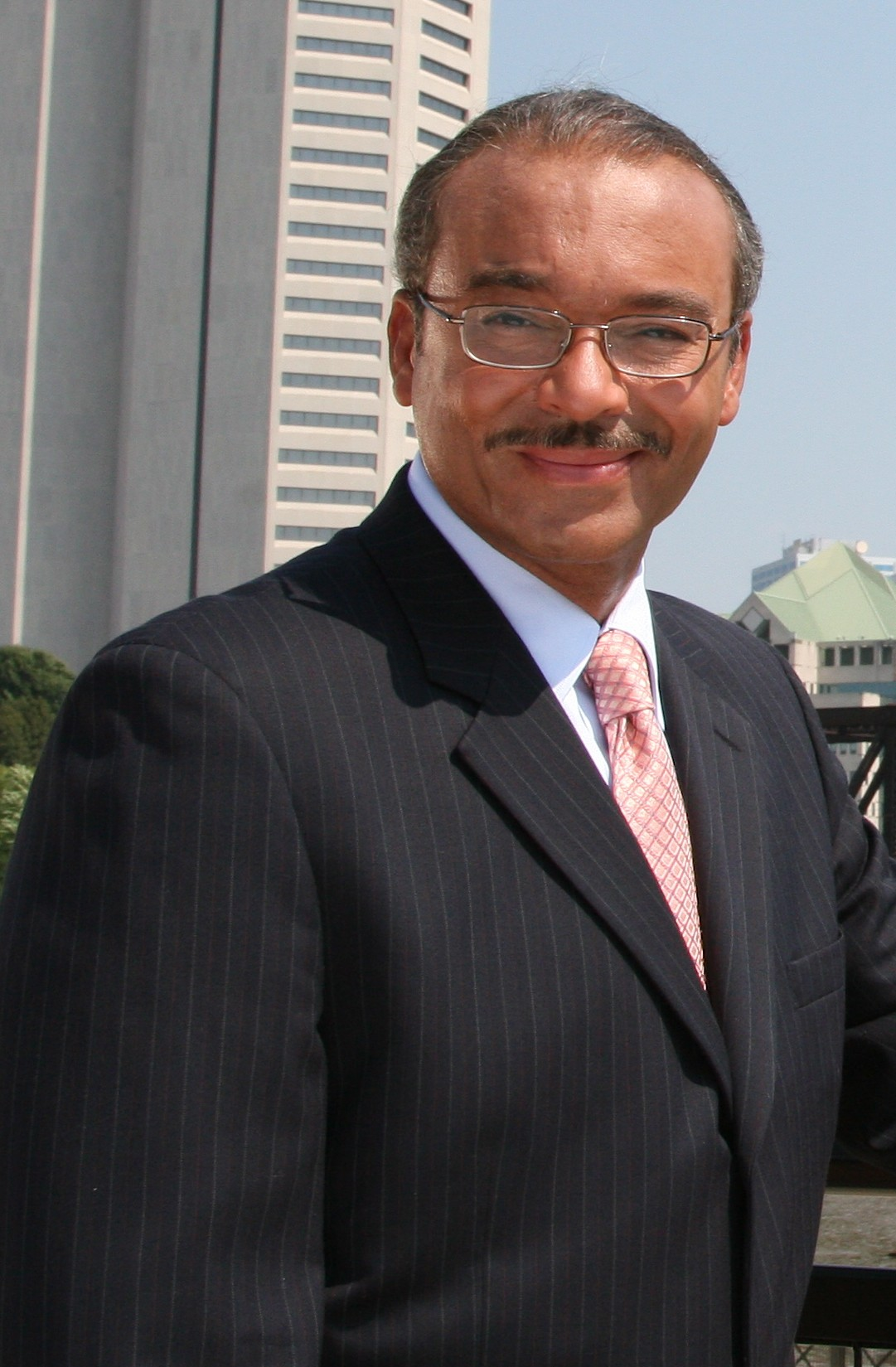
Michael B. Coleman, 52nd mayor of Columbus, and the first African American to serve as mayor of Ohio's capital

Political parties

Party affiliation not known Democratic Whig Republican

No. (Note: For the purposes of numbering, a mayoralty is defined as an uninterrupted period of time in office served by one person. As examples, Jarvis W. Pike served two consecutive terms and is counted as the first mayor – not the first and second mayor. Upon the resignation of the 6th mayor James Robinson, William Long was appointed the 7th mayor to complete the remainder of Robinson's second term and was never directly elected as mayor. Alexander Patton was both the 17th mayor and the 19th mayor because his two terms were not consecutive.)	Mayor	Took office	Left office	Party	Term	Previous office
1	Jarvis W. Pike (1795–1854)	1816	1817		1 (1816)	Member of Columbus Burough Council (1816–1827)
1	Jarvis W. Pike (1795–1854)	1816	1817		2 (1817)	Member of Columbus Burough Council (1816–1827)
2	John Kerr (1778–1823)	1818	1820		3 (1818)	Member of Columbus Burough Council (1816–1823)
2	John Kerr (1778–1823)	1818	1820		4 (1819)	Member of Columbus Burough Council (1816–1823)
3	Eli C. King	1820	1822		5 (1820)	Justice of the Peace for Montgomery Township (1816–1820)
3	Eli C. King	1820	1822		6 (1821)	Justice of the Peace for Montgomery Township (1816–1820)
3	Eli C. King	1820	1822		7 (1822)	Justice of the Peace for Montgomery Township (1816–1820)
4	John Laughrey (1784– )	1823	1823		8 (1823)	
5	William T. Martin (1788–1866)	1824	1826		9 (1824)	Recorder of Columbus (1823, 1834–1838)
5	William T. Martin (1788–1866)	1824	1826		10 (1825)	Recorder of Columbus (1823, 1834–1838)
5	William T. Martin (1788–1866)	1824	1826		11 (1826)	Recorder of Columbus (1823, 1834–1838)
6	James Robinson	1827	September 11, 1827 (Note: Resigned from office.)		12 (1827)	Member of Columbus Burough Council (1823–1827)
7	William Long (1781–1851)	1827	1833		12 (1827)	Recorder of Columbus (1824–1827)
7	William Long (1781–1851)	1827	1833		13 (1828)	Recorder of Columbus (1824–1827)
7	William Long (1781–1851)	1827	1833		14 (1829)	Recorder of Columbus (1824–1827)
7	William Long (1781–1851)	1827	1833		15 (1830)	Recorder of Columbus (1824–1827)
7	William Long (1781–1851)	1827	1833		16 (1831)	Recorder of Columbus (1824–1827)
7	William Long (1781–1851)	1827	1833		17 (1832)	Recorder of Columbus (1824–1827)
8	Philo H. Olmsted (1793–1870)	1833	1833	Whig	18 (1833)	Ohio Representative from Franklin County (1831–1832, 1833–1834)
9	John Brooks (1785–1869)	April 21, 1834	April 21, 1835		19 (1834)	
10	John Bailhache (1787–1857)	1835	1835	Whig	19 (1834)	Ross County Common Pleas Court Judge (1825)
11	Warren Jenkins	1836	September 4, 1837	Whig	20 (1836)	Justice of the Peace for Montgomery Township (1835–1837)
12	Philo H. Olmsted (1793–1870)	1838	1839	Whig	21 (1838)	Ohio Representative from Franklin County (1831–1832, 1833–1834)
13	John G. Miller (1795–1871)	1840	May 4, 1841	Whig	22 (1840)	
14	Thomas Wood (1782–1861)	May 1841	1841		22 (1840)	Justice of the Peace for Montgomery Township (1828–1843)
15	Abram I. McDowell (1793–1844)	1842	1842 (Note: Abram Irvin McDowell was elected in 1842, but only served the first year of his two-year term. Smithson E. Wright was elected in 1843 for a two-year term.)		23 (1842)	Clerk for the Court of Common Pleas (1815–1836)
16	Smithson E. Wright (1807–1881)	1843	1844	Whig	24 (1843)	
17	Alexander Patton (1791–1857)	1845	1845	Whig	25 (1845)	Justice of the Peace for Montgomery Township (1843–1849)
18	Augustus S. Decker (1813–1872)	1846	1846	Whig	25 (1845)	
19	Alexander Patton (1791–1858)	1847	1849	Whig	26 (1847)	Justice of the Peace for Montgomery Township (1843–1849)
19	Alexander Patton (1791–1858)	1847	1849	Whig	27 (1849)	Justice of the Peace for Montgomery Township (1843–1849)
20	Lorenzo English (1819–1888)	1850	1861	Whig	28 (1851)	No previous experience in public office
20	Lorenzo English (1819–1888)	1850	1861	Whig	29 (1853)	No previous experience in public office
20	Lorenzo English (1819–1888)	1850	1861	Whig	30 (1855)	No previous experience in public office
20	Lorenzo English (1819–1888)	1850	1861	Whig	31 (1857)	No previous experience in public office
20	Lorenzo English (1819–1888)	1850	1861	Whig	32 (1859)	No previous experience in public office
21	Wray Thomas (1810–)	1861	1864	Democratic	33 (1861)	Ohio Representative from Delaware and Franklin County (1831–1832, 1833–1834)
21	Wray Thomas (1810–)	1861	1864	Democratic	34 (1863)	Ohio Representative from Delaware and Franklin County (1831–1832, 1833–1834)
22	James G. Bull (1838–1927)	1865	1868	Democratic	35 (1865)	No previous experience in public office
22	James G. Bull (1838–1927)	1865	1868	Democratic	36 (1867)	No previous experience in public office
23	George W. Meeker (1833–1890)	1869	1870	Democratic	37 (1869)	Justice of the Peace for Montgomery Township (1863–1869)
24	James G. Bull (1838–1927)	1871	1874	Democratic	38 (1871)	Mayor of Columbus (1865–1868)
24	James G. Bull (1838–1927)	1871	1874	Democratic	39 (1873)	Mayor of Columbus (1865–1868)
25	John H. Heitmann (1841–1894)	1875	1878	Democratic	40 (1875)	Ohio Representative from Franklin County (1874–1876)
25	John H. Heitmann (1841–1894)	1875	1878	Democratic	41 (1877)	Ohio Representative from Franklin County (1874–1876)
26	Gilbert G. Collins (1830–1885)	1879	1880	Republican	42 (1879)	City Attorney of Columbus (1873–1875)
27	George S. Peters (1846–1928)	1881	1882	Democratic	43 (1881)	No previous experience in public office
28	Charles C. Walcutt (1838–1898)	1883	1886	Republican	44 (1883)	Member of Columbus Board of Education (1873–1894)
28	Charles C. Walcutt (1838–1898)	1883	1886	Republican	45 (1885)	Member of Columbus Board of Education (1873–1894)
29	Philip H. Bruck (1845–1920)	1887	1890	Democratic	46 (1887)	No previous experience in public office
29	Philip H. Bruck (1845–1920)	1887	1890	Democratic	47 (1889)	No previous experience in public office
30	George J. Karb (1858–1937)	1891	1894	Democratic	48 (1891)	Columbus Police Commissioner (1889–1890)
30	George J. Karb (1858–1937)	1891	1894	Democratic	49 (1893)	Columbus Police Commissioner (1889–1890)
31	Cotton H. Allen (1834–1900)	1895	1896	Democratic	50 (1895)	No previous experience in public office
32	Samuel L. Black (1859–1929)	1897	April 15, 1899	Democratic	51 (1897)	No previous experience in public office
33	Samuel J. Swartz (1859–1905)	1899	1900	Republican	52 (1899)	Police Court Judge of Columbus (1897–1898)
34	John N. Hinkle (1854–1905)	1901	May 4, 1903	Democratic	53 (1901)	No previous experience in public office
35	Robert H. Jeffrey (1873–1961)	May 4, 1903	January 1, 1906 (Note: Retired from office.) (Note: The Ohio General Assembly changed Ohio election times during his tenure in office. Consequently, his term in office was extended by an additional eight months.)	Republican	54 (1903)	No previous experience in public office
36	De Witt C. Badger (1858–1926)	January 1, 1906	1907	Democratic	55 (1905)	U.S. Representative from Ohio (1903–1905)
37	Charles A. Bond (1873–1943)	1908	1909	Republican	56 (1907)	No previous experience in public office
38	George S. Marshall (1869–1956)	1910	January 1, 1912 (Note: Lost re-election.)	Republican	57 (1909)	Asst City Attorney of Columbus (1899–1909)
39	George J. Karb (1858–1937)	January 1, 1912	January 1, 1920	Democratic	58 (1911)	Franklin County Sheriff (1903–1909)
39	George J. Karb (1858–1937)	January 1, 1912	January 1, 1920	Democratic	59 (1913)	Franklin County Sheriff (1903–1909)
39	George J. Karb (1858–1937)	January 1, 1912	January 1, 1920	Democratic	60 (1915)	Franklin County Sheriff (1903–1909)
40	James J. Thomas (1868–1947)	January 1, 1920	January 1, 1932	Republican	61 (1919)	Member of Columbus City Council (1898–1901)
40	James J. Thomas (1868–1947)	January 1, 1920	January 1, 1932	Republican	62 (1923)	Member of Columbus City Council (1898–1901)
40	James J. Thomas (1868–1947)	January 1, 1920	January 1, 1932	Republican	63 (1927)	Member of Columbus City Council (1898–1901)
41	Henry W. Worley (1877–1938)	January 1, 1932	1935	Democratic	64 (1931)	Member of Columbus City Council (1922–1932)
42	Myron B. Gessaman (1894–1975)	1936	1939	Republican	65 (1935)	Member of the Ohio House of Representatives (1934–1935)
43	Floyd F. Green (1900–1952)	1940	1943	Republican	66 (1939)	Member of Columbus City Council (1927–1931)
44	Jim Rhodes (1909–2001)	1944	1952	Republican	67 (1943)	City Auditor of Columbus (1939–1943)
44	Jim Rhodes (1909–2001)	1944	1952	Republican	68 (1947)	City Auditor of Columbus (1939–1943)
44	Jim Rhodes (1909–2001)	1944	1952	Republican	69 (1951)	City Auditor of Columbus (1939–1943)
45	Robert T. Oestreicher (1894–1955)	1953	1953	Republican	69 (1951)	President of Columbus City Council
46	Jack Sensenbrenner (1902–1991)	January 1, 1954	January 1, 1960	Democratic	69 (1951)	No previous experience in public office
46	Jack Sensenbrenner (1902–1991)	January 1, 1954	January 1, 1960	Democratic	70 (1955)	No previous experience in public office
47	Ralston Westlake (1907–1978)	January 1, 1960	January 1, 1964	Republican	71 (1959)	Member of Columbus City Council (1956–1959)
48	Jack Sensenbrenner (1902–1991)	January 1, 1964	January 1, 1972	Democratic	72 (1963)	Mayor of Columbus (1954–1960)
48	Jack Sensenbrenner (1902–1991)	January 1, 1964	January 1, 1972	Democratic	73 (1967)	Mayor of Columbus (1954–1960)
49	Tom Moody (1929–2008)	January 1, 1972	January 1, 1984	Republican	74 (1971)	Franklin County Common Pleas Court Judge (1968–1971)
49	Tom Moody (1929–2008)	January 1, 1972	January 1, 1984	Republican	75 (1975)	Franklin County Common Pleas Court Judge (1968–1971)
49	Tom Moody (1929–2008)	January 1, 1972	January 1, 1984	Republican	76 (1979)	Franklin County Common Pleas Court Judge (1968–1971)
50	Buck Rinehart (1946–2015)	January 1, 1984	January 1, 1992	Republican	77 (1983)	Franklin County Treasurer of Ohio (1976–1984)
50	Buck Rinehart (1946–2015)	January 1, 1984	January 1, 1992	Republican	78 (1987)	Franklin County Treasurer of Ohio (1976–1984)
51	Greg Lashutka (born 1944)	January 1, 1992	January 1, 2000	Republican	79 (1991)	City Attorney of Columbus (1978–1985)
51	Greg Lashutka (born 1944)	January 1, 1992	January 1, 2000	Republican	80 (1995)	City Attorney of Columbus (1978–1985)
52	Michael B. Coleman (born 1954)	January 1, 2000	January 1, 2016	Democratic	81 (1999)	President of Columbus City Council (1997–1999)
52	Michael B. Coleman (born 1954)	January 1, 2000	January 1, 2016	Democratic	82 (2003)	President of Columbus City Council (1997–1999)
52	Michael B. Coleman (born 1954)	January 1, 2000	January 1, 2016	Democratic	83 (2007)	President of Columbus City Council (1997–1999)
52	Michael B. Coleman (born 1954)	January 1, 2000	January 1, 2016	Democratic	84 (2011)	President of Columbus City Council (1997–1999)
53	Andrew Ginther (born 1975)	January 1, 2016	Incumbent	Democratic	85 (2015)	President of Columbus City Council (2011–2015)
53	Andrew Ginther (born 1975)	January 1, 2016	Incumbent	Democratic	86 (2019)	President of Columbus City Council (2011–2015)
53	Andrew Ginther (born 1975)	January 1, 2016	Incumbent	Democratic	87 (2023)	President of Columbus City Council (2011–2015)

== See also ==
- Government of Columbus, Ohio
- Green Lawn Cemetery – Numerous former mayors of Ohio's capital city are interred at this notable cemetery. It is located in the southern section of Columbus, Ohio.
- Timeline of Columbus, Ohio

== Bibliography ==
Books

- The Biographical Encyclopœdia of Ohio of the Nineteenth Century. Cincinnati and Philadelphia: Galaxy Publishing Company. 1876.
- A Centennial Biographical History of the City of Columbus and Franklin County, Ohio. County and regional histories of the "Old Northwest.": Ohio. Chicago: Lewis Publishing Company. 1901.
- Egger, Charles, ed. (1975). Columbus Mayors (PDF). Columbus, Ohio.
- Fitzpatrick, Stephen A.; Ulysses, Ulysses S. (1897). History of Columbus Celebration, Franklinton Centennial. New Franklin Printing Company.
- Ide, George A. (1908). History of Union County, Iowa: From the Earliest Historic Times to 1908: Also Biographical Sketches of Some Prominent Citizens of the County. Unigraphic.
- Lee, Alfred Emory (1892). History of the City of Columbus, Capital of Ohio. Vol. 2. Munsell & Company.
- Lentz, Ed (2003). Columbus: The Story of a City. The Making of America Series. Arcadia Publishing. ISBN 9780738524290. OCLC 52740866.
- Lentz, Ed (2011). Historic Columbus: A Bicentennial History. San Antonio, Texas: Historical Publishing Network. ISBN 9781935377597.
- Mercer, James Kazerta; Rife, Edward K. (1903). Representative Men of Ohio, 1900-1903. J.K. Mercer.
- Reid, Whitelaw (1895). Ohio in the War: Her Statesmen Her Generals and Soldiers. Vol. 1. Gale Cengage Learning. ISBN 9781432814762.
- Taylor, William Alexander (1909). Centennial History of Columbus and Franklin County, Ohio. Vol. 1. S. J. Clarke Publishing Company. ISBN 9780832828300.
- Taylor, William Alexander (1909). Centennial history of Columbus and Franklin County, Ohio. Vol. 2. S. J. Clarke Publishing Company.

Newspapers

- "Defeat In Columbus; Republicans Elect Many Mayors". Rochester Journal. Rochester, New York. Associated Press. November 6, 1935. p. 3.
- Carmen, Barbara (December 31, 1991). "Lashutka Welcomed As 46th Mayor". The Columbus Dispatch. p. 1A.
- Tim Doulin; Barbara Carmen (October 31, 2008). "Former Mayor Tom Moody Dies at 78". Columbus Dispatch.
- "Moody Is Victor; Mayor's Aides Halt Recount". The Portsmouth Times. Portsmouth, Ohio. November 27, 1971. p. 11.
- Powers, Scott (December 29, 1991). "Lashutka, Rinehart to Dedicate Hall of Mayors". The Columbus Dispatch. Columbus, Ohio. p. 01B.
- Reindl, Kristi (December 2, 1999). "Mayor Will Speak at Fall Graduation". The Lantern. Columbus, Ohio.
- "Republican Wins; Councilman Fails in Bid to Be First Black Mayor". Associated Press News. Columbus, Ohio. November 6, 1991.
