= Buck Rinehart =

American lawyer

Dana G. Rinehart
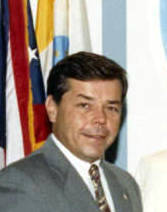

50th Mayor of Columbus
- In office January 1, 1984 – January 1, 1992
- Preceded by: Tom Moody
- Succeeded by: Greg Lashutka

Personal details
- Born: Dana Gillman Rinehart; February 24, 1946 Parkersburg, West Virginia, U.S.
- Died: February 18, 2015 (aged 68) Columbus, Ohio, U.S.
- Party: Republican
- Education: Ohio State University (B.A., J.D.)
- Profession: Attorney
- Nickname: Buck

Dana Gillman "Buck" Rinehart (February 24, 1946 – February 18, 2015) was an American attorney who served as the 50th mayor of Columbus, Ohio, from 1984 to 1992.

== Biography ==
Rinehart was born in Parkersburg, West Virginia in 1946. Having served in the United States Marine Corps Reserve, retiring as a Lieutenant Colonel, Rinehart attended Ohio State University in Columbus, earning a B.A. in Political Science. He later attended Moritz College of Law at Ohio State, graduating cum laude.

Rinehart began his career as treasurer of Franklin County, Ohio, from 1976-1984. As County Treasurer, he posted a sign at the county building listing the names of real-estate tax scofflaws, the "Dirty Dozen".

After mounting a failed 1982 campaign for governor, Rinehart ran for mayor in 1983, to replace outgoing Republican mayor, Tom Moody (1972–1984). Rinehart narrowly won the election to become the 50th mayor of Columbus. He won re-election in 1987. Rinehart did not seek a third term after the revelation of his affair with Brenda Dodrill, whom he later married.

His term of mayor was characterized by an intense effort to distance Columbus, Ohio from its cowtown reputation (New World Center, 1986; convention center/arena complex, 1987; acquiring St. Louis Cardinals NFL football team, 1988).

In an April 2, 2013, article, the Columbus Dispatch described Rinehart's eight years as the city's mayor as "tumultuous." "No idea was too big, no plan too outrageous for Rinehart," the Dispatch reported. "During his administration, the city built a $28 million Downtown safety building, the Franklin County Solid Waste Authority was established, I-670 from Downtown to Port Columbus was completed, City Center mall was planned and built (and is now a downtown park), redevelopment of the Short North and Brewery District got under way, the Martin Luther King Center was developed, and retail and residential growth began at Easton." Rinehart's leadership lead to the annexation of the Polaris area and the successful development of Southern Delaware County.

However, the Dispatch also said that Rinehart made "glaring mistakes." One example cited by the Dispatch was Rinehart taking a wrecking ball to what was then the 120-year-old facade of the old Ohio Penitentiary on Spring Street, only to learn later that the city didn’t have permission for demolition.

After leaving office, Rinehart returned to practicing law at Rinehart, Rishel & Cuckler, Ltd, where his clients included powerful business interests. For example, a July 4, 2011, Cleveland.com article reported that Rinehart lobbied for the Ohio Independent Automobile Dealers Association.

Rinehart died from pancreatic cancer on February 18, 2015.

Party political offices
Preceded by George C. Rogers	Republican nominee for Ohio State Treasurer; 1982	Succeeded by Jeff Jacobs
Political offices
Preceded by Tom Moody	Mayor of Columbus, Ohio; 1984-1992	Succeeded by Greg Lashutka
