= Floyd F. Green =

American politician

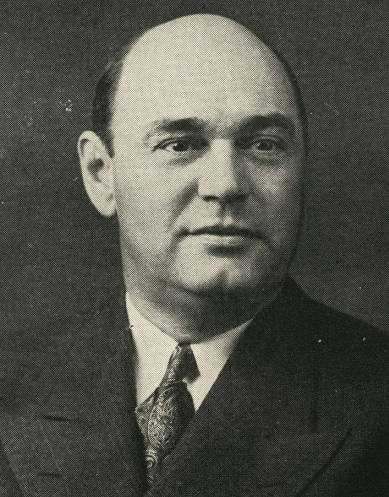

43rd Mayor of Columbus
- In office 1940–1943
- Preceded by: Myron B. Gessaman
- Succeeded by: Jim A. Rhodes

Personal details
- Born: July 10, 1899 Columbus, Ohio
- Died: January 12, 1952 (aged 51–52) Newark, Ohio
- Party: Republican
- Profession: Member of Columbus City Council

Floyd F. Green (July 10, 1899 – January 12, 1952) was the 43rd mayor of Columbus, Ohio and the 39th person to serve in that office.

Green was born in Columbus in 1900. He served as a member of Columbus City Council from 1927 to 1931. He was elected mayor in 1939 and served Columbus during World War II. After one term in office he was defeated in the 1943 mayoral election by Jim A. Rhodes. He died on January 12, 1952, from a cerebral hemorrhage.

== Bibliography ==
- Egger, Charles, ed. (1975). Columbus Mayors (PDF). Columbus: Columbus Citizen-Journal.

Political offices
Preceded by Myron B. Gessaman	Mayor of Columbus, Ohio; 1940–1943	Succeeded by Jim A. Rhodes
