= Greg Lashutka =

American politician (born 1944)

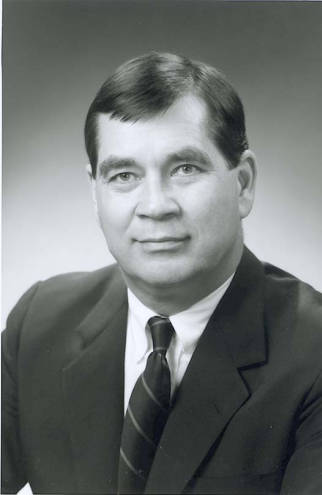

51st Mayor of Columbus
- In office January 1, 1992 – January 1, 2000
- Preceded by: Buck Rinehart
- Succeeded by: Michael B. Coleman

70th President of the National League of Cities
- In office 1996
- Preceded by: Carolyn Long Banks
- Succeeded by: Mark Schwartz

Personal details
- Born: March 28, 1944 (age 82) New York City, New York, U.S.
- Party: Republican
- Education: Ohio State University (B.S.); Capital University Law School (J.D.)
- Profession: Attorney
American football career
Greg Lashutka
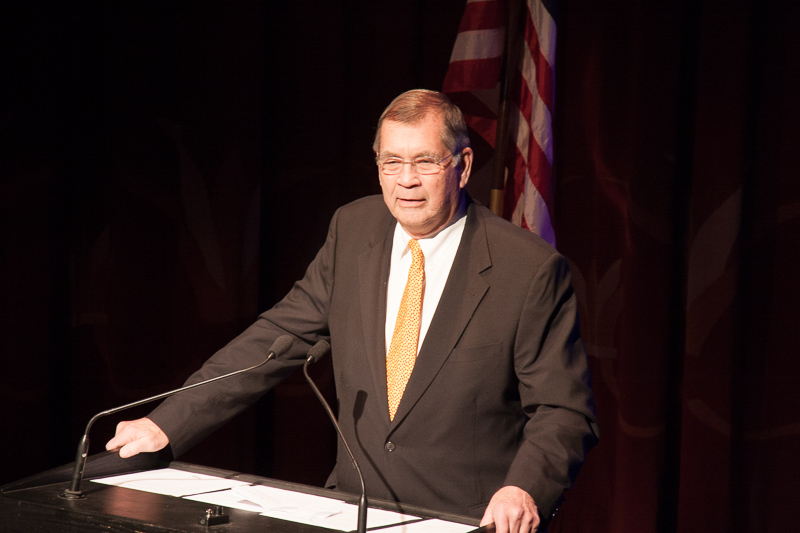
Profile
- Position: Tight end
Personal information
- Listed height: 6 ft 5 in (1.96 m)
- Listed weight: 231 lb (105 kg)
Career information
- High school: John Marshall (Cleveland, Ohio)
- College: Ohio State (1963−1965)
- AFL draft: 1966: 18th round, 163rd overall pick
Career history
- Buffalo Bills (1966)*
- * Offseason or practice squad member only

Gregory S. Lashutka (born March 28, 1944) is an American lawyer who served as the 51st mayor of Columbus, Ohio, from 1992 to 2000. He is an Eagle Scout and had earlier been an American football player.

Lashutka is the most recent Republican mayor of Columbus as of 2026.

== Athletics ==
Lashutka was tight end for the Ohio State University Buckeyes football team, under head coach Woody Hayes, from 1963 to 1965. In 1965 Lashutka served as his team's co-captain with Ike Kelley. In 1966, he was drafted to play professionally by the Buffalo Bills, at the time a member team of the American Football League (AFL). He stayed a year with the Bills, playing only on the practice team. He then returned to Ohio State to finish his bachelor's degree in history in 1967. While at Ohio State, Lashutka was a member of Kappa Sigma fraternity.

== Law and public service ==
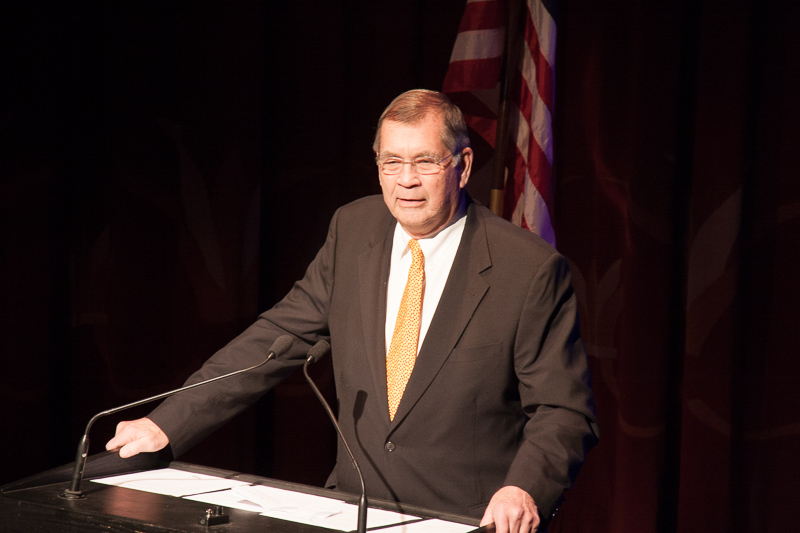
Lashutka speaks at the community swearing-in ceremony of Andrew Ginther, 53rd Mayor of Columbus, in January 2016

Lashutka continued his education and received a Juris Doctor from Capital University Law School. Lashutka served two terms as Columbus City Attorney and then became a partner with the law firm of Squire, Sanders & Dempsey. He was elected mayor of Columbus in 1991 and reelected in 1995. He did not seek a third term as mayor in 1999, primarily because of his health concerns after suffering a heart attack. He joined Nationwide Insurance in January 2000 as Senior Vice President of Corporate Relations. He is the most recent Republican mayor of the city of Columbus. This career move was announced right after the voters of Columbus refused to publicly finance a hockey arena for the newly established Columbus Blue Jackets of the NHL, which were partially owned by Nationwide Insurance. Lashukta was the head spokesperson of the effort in support of the arena and famously said during the campaign: "there is no plan B" if the ballot measure failed. It did fail, and within a week, Nationwide Insurance announced plan B: it would finance the arena all by itself, and it opened in September 2000. His areas of practice are governmental relations and insurance. Additionally, Lashutka serves as a vice-chair of Franklin University and is a Fellow of the National Academy of Public Administration (United States). He is also an Eagle Scout and recipient of the Distinguished Eagle Scout Award.

Lashutka served as president of the National League of Cities in 1996.

Political offices
Preceded by Buck Rinehart	Mayor of Columbus, Ohio; 1992–2000	Succeeded by Michael B. Coleman
