= Jack Sensenbrenner =

American politician (1902–1991)

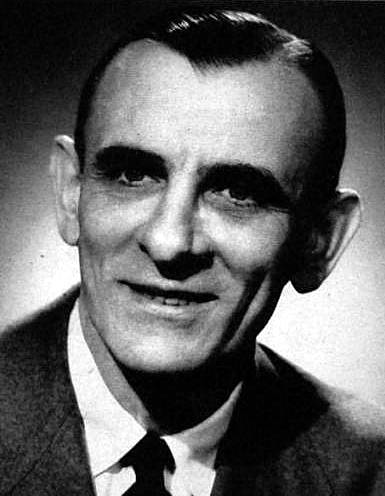

46th and 48th Mayor of Columbus
- In office January 1, 1964 – January 1, 1972
- Preceded by: Ralston Westlake
- Succeeded by: Tom Moody
- In office January 1, 1954 – January 1, 1960
- Preceded by: Robert T. Oestreicher
- Succeeded by: Ralston Westlake

Personal details
- Born: Maynard Edward Sensenbrenner; September 18, 1902 Circleville, Ohio, United States
- Died: August 2, 1991 (aged 88) Columbus, Ohio, United States
- Party: Democratic
- Spouse: Mildred Harriet Sexauer
- Children: Patricia Sensenbrenner; Edward Sensenbrenner; Richard Sensenbrenner
- Education: Circleville High School

Maynard Edward "Jack" Sensenbrenner (September 18, 1902 – August 2, 1991) was an American politician of the Democratic Party, who served as a populist mayor of Columbus, Ohio.

== Biography ==
The son of a jeweler, Sensenbrenner was born in rural Circleville, Ohio, south of Columbus on U.S. Route 23. Sensenbrenner graduated from Circleville High School and attended a Bible college in Los Angeles, intending to follow his twin brother Marion into the ministry, but he did not complete the course. Sensenbrenner worked in a variety of jobs, including working in oil fields and for the advertising department of the Los Angeles Times. During the Great Depression, he worked as a Fuller Brush salesman in southern California. His move to the west coast was prompted by Mildred Harriet Sexauer, the niece of a former mayor of Lancaster, Ohio. When her family moved out West to find work, Jack followed. Jack and Mildred married in 1927 and remained married for over fifty years, producing three children, Patricia (died at birth), Edward and Richard. In 1934, he returned to Circleville and started working in sales. Soon after he moved to Columbus, settling on the West side where he became a partner in a religious bookstore.

In 1953, Sensenbrenner, then a stranger to politics (although he had been active in the Columbus community) surprised the Franklin County Democratic Committee with a visit to announce his intentions to run for mayor of Columbus. The party was without any strong hopefuls — Columbus had not had a Democratic mayor since 1935 — but they would not endorse Sensenbrenner. Only after a runoff within the party did Sensenbrenner secure the Democratic nomination. His upset win in 1954 was written up around the country. His success might have largely been due to Sensenbrenner's decision to campaign on local television, which was uncommon at the time.

Sensenbrenner was unseated from 1960 to 1963 by Republican Ralston Westlake, but was reelected to a second mayoral term. He served as Columbus's mayor from 1954 to 1960 and again from 1964 to 1972. He laid the groundwork for the massive growth of Columbus in the late 20th century by requiring all neighborhoods that accepted city water service to be annexed into the city. His policy allowed Columbus to grow to become the largest city in Ohio. Under his leadership Columbus grew by more than 100 square miles (260 km^{2}). He would be the city's last Democratic mayor for 28 years.

Sensenbrenner was a popular political character in Columbus, known for throwing around terms like spizzerinctum, which, he said, was the quality that made "Columbus, the United States of America, the Boy Scouts of America ... absolutely dynamic." (He picked up the term from his high school football coach.) He habitually wore a straw skimmer hat and at the drop of a hat would perform an old-fashioned shuffle dance. His creed "God, Love and Country" helped to win Columbus the coveted "All-America City Award" from the National Civic League in 1958.

When the Columbus Zoo's western lowland gorilla had her first baby in 1968, the name Emmy was chosen for the little girl, named after "M. E." Sensenbrenner. Emmy died in 1982. Her mother Colo was the first gorilla born in captivity and proved to be longest living gorilla in captivity as of her death in 2017.

The Sensenbrenners' grandson, Edward's son Richard Sensenbrenner, served as a member of the Columbus city council.

== Bibliography ==
- "Dems Score Upsets In Many Cities, Columbus Mayoralty Leads Parade of Ballet Surprises". The Portsmouth Times. Associated Press. November 4, 1953. pp. 1, col. 7.
- Tebben, Gerald (August 2, 2012). "Columbus Mileposts Aug, 2, 1991: Sensenbrenner Grew City Around Suburbs". The Columbus Dispatch. Columbus, Ohio. Archived from the original on 3 November 2013.

Political offices
Preceded by Robert T. Oestreicher	Mayor of Columbus, Ohio; 1954-1960	Succeeded by Ralston Westlake
Preceded by Ralston Westlake	Mayor of Columbus, Ohio; 1964-1972	Succeeded by Tom Moody
