= Charles Orr =

Charles Orr may refer to:

- Charles Prentiss Orr (1858–1922), United States Federal judge
- Charles Orr (rugby union) (1866–1935), Scottish rugby football player
- Sir Charles William James Orr (1870–1945), British colonial administrator, governor of the Bahamas
- Charles Orr (socialist) (born 1906), American economist and socialist
- C. W. Orr (Charles Wilfred Orr, 1893–1976), English composer
- Charles N. Orr (1877–1949), Minnesota politician
- Pete Orr (racing driver) (Charles Orr, 1956–2002), American racing driver

== See also ==
- Charles Orr-Ewing (disambiguation)
