= Robert J. Cindrich =

American judge (born 1943)

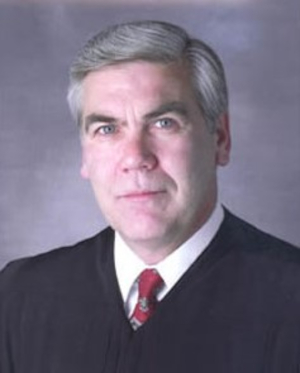

Judge of the United States District Court for the Western District of Pennsylvania
- In office October 7, 1994 – January 30, 2004
- Appointed by: Bill Clinton
- Preceded by: Gustave Diamond
- Succeeded by: Nora Barry Fischer

Personal details
- Born: Robert James Cindrich; September 22, 1943 (age 82) Washington, Pennsylvania
- Education: Wittenberg University (AB); University of Pittsburgh School of Law (JD)

Robert James Cindrich (born September 22, 1943) is a former United States district judge of the United States District Court for the Western District of Pennsylvania and a former federal judicial nominee to the United States Court of Appeals for the Third Circuit.

== Early life and education ==
Born in Washington, Pennsylvania, Cindrich earned an Artium Baccalaureus degree from Wittenberg University in 1965 and earned a Juris Doctor magna cum laude from the University of Pittsburgh School of Law in 1968. After law school, Cindrich clerked for United States Court of Appeals for the Third Circuit Judge Ruggero J. Aldisert from 1968 until 1969.

== Professional career prior to becoming a judge ==
After a stint as a United States Army Reserve specialist from 1968 until 1971, Cindrich worked for Allegheny County, Pennsylvania as an assistant public defender from 1969 until 1970 and as an assistant district attorney from 1970 until 1972. Cindrich shifted to private legal practice from 1972 until 1978. Cindrich served as the United States Attorney for the Western District of Pennsylvania from 1978 until 1981, when he again returned to private legal practice until being appointed to the federal bench. While Cindrich was in private practice, he hired future Third Circuit Judge Thomas Hardiman as an associate at his firm.

== Federal judicial service ==
On August 12, 1994, President Clinton nominated Cindrich to become a judge for the United States District Court for the Western District of Pennsylvania. The United States Senate unanimously confirmed Cindrich in a voice vote on October 6, 1994.

== Nomination to the Third Circuit ==
On February 9, 2000, President Clinton nominated Cindrich for a seat on the Third Circuit, to replace Timothy K. Lewis, who had resigned at age 44 to work in private practice. With Republicans in control of the Senate in the final year of Clinton's presidency, however, Cindrich's nomination languished, never receiving a hearing before the United States Senate Judiciary Committee. Cindrich's nomination to the Third Circuit was terminated with the end of Clinton's presidency. In 2001, President Bush nominated D. Brooks Smith to the Third Circuit seat to which Cindrich had been nominated. Smith was confirmed by the Senate the following year.

== Resignation and life after being a judge ==
On January 5, 2004, Cindrich announced that he would resign as district judge on January 30, 2004 to become chief legal counsel to the University of Pittsburgh Medical Center, effective February 1, 2004. Cindrich said he was quitting in part for financial reasons, noting that his lifetime salary offered no survivor's benefit for his wife. "If death takes me early, she is stuck," he told the Pittsburgh Post-Gazette in an article that appeared on January 6, 2004. "She gets zero. In the private sector, by federal law, every pension must contain a survivor's benefit." Cindrich said he also was frustrated by strict sentencing guidelines that he believed removed discretion from judges. "When the law provides a result that is repugnant, we must still follow the law," Cindrich told the Associated Press in a story that appeared in its feed on February 2, 2004. "And you can only do that so many times before you start to wonder, 'How many more times am I going to put my name on this sentence that I don't believe in?'"

== See also ==
- Bill Clinton judicial appointment controversies

Legal offices
Preceded by Gustave Diamond	Judge of the United States District Court for the Western District of Pennsylvania; 1994–2004	Succeeded by Nora Barry Fischer
