= United States v. Pohlot =

- Court: United States Court of Appeals for the Third Circuit
- Full case name: United States v. Pohlot
- Argued: December 18, 1986
- Decided: August 25, 1987
- Citations: 827 F.2d 889; 56 USLW 2153; 23 Fed. R. Evid. Serv. 1121

Court membership
- Judges sitting: A. Leon Higginbotham Jr., Edward R. Becker, Edward Dumbauld (W.D. Pa.)

Case opinions
- Majority: Becker, joined by a unanimous court

United States v. Pohlot, 827 F.2d 889 (3d Cir. 1987), is a criminal case that summarized diverse uses of the expression "diminished capacity".
