= Dumbauld =

Dumbauld is a surname. Notable people with the surname include:

- Edward Dumbauld (1905–1997), American judge
- Jon Dumbauld (born 1963), American football player
