= Judge Diamond =

Judge Diamond may refer to:

- Gustave Diamond (1928–2021), judge of the United States District Court for the Western District of Pennsylvania
- Paul S. Diamond (born 1953), judge of the United States District Court for the Eastern District of Pennsylvania
