= Judge Rosenberg =

Judge Rosenberg may refer to:

- Louis Rosenberg (judge) (1898–1999), judge of the United States District Court for the Western District of Pennsylvania
- Robin L. Rosenberg (born 1962), judge of the United States District Court for the Southern District of Florida
