= Donald J. Lee =

American judge (1927–2011)

Donald John Lee
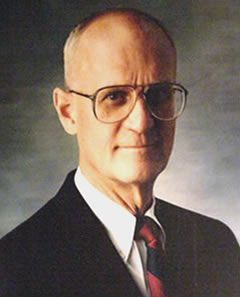

Senior Judge of the United States District Court for the Western District of Pennsylvania
- In office April 6, 2000 – March 17, 2011

Judge of the United States District Court for the Western District of Pennsylvania
- In office March 12, 1990 – April 6, 2000
- Appointed by: George H. W. Bush
- Preceded by: Hubert Irving Teitelbaum
- Succeeded by: David S. Cercone

Personal details
- Born: Donald John Lee; July 24, 1927 Pittsburgh, Pennsylvania
- Died: March 17, 2011 (aged 83) Pittsburgh, Pennsylvania
- Education: University of Pittsburgh (AB); Duquesne University School of Law (LLB)

Donald John Lee (July 24, 1927 – March 17, 2011) was a United States district judge of the United States District Court for the Western District of Pennsylvania.

== Education and career ==
Born in Pittsburgh, Pennsylvania, Lee was in the United States Navy in the aftermath of World War II, from 1945 to 1947. He received an Artium Baccalaureus degree from the University of Pittsburgh in 1950 and a Bachelor of Laws from Duquesne University School of Law in 1954. He was in private practice in Pittsburgh from 1954 to 1956. He was a law clerk for Judge Rabe Marsh of the United States District Court for the Western District of Pennsylvania from 1957 to 1958. He was in private practice in Pittsburgh from 1958 to 1984. He was a councilman of the Borough of Green Tree, Pennsylvania from 1961 to 1963. He was a special assistant state attorney general of Pennsylvania from 1963 to 1974. He was a Solicitor for the Borough of Green Tree, Pennsylvania from 1963 to 1984 and from 1986 to 1988. He was a Judge on the Court of Common Pleas of Allegheny County from 1984 to 1986 and from 1988 to 1990.

== Federal judicial service ==
Lee was a United States District Judge of the United States District Court for the Western District of Pennsylvania. Lee was nominated by President George H. W. Bush on November 9, 1989, to a seat vacated by Judge Hubert Irving Teitelbaum. He was confirmed by the United States Senate on March 9, 1990, and received his commission on March 12, 1990. He assumed senior status on April 6, 2000, serving in that status until his death on March 17, 2011.

== Sources ==
- FJC Bio

Legal offices
Preceded by Hubert Irving Teitelbaum	Judge of the United States District Court for the Western District of Pennsylvania; 1990–2000	Succeeded by David S. Cercone
