= Arthur Schwab =

Arthur Schwab is the name of:

- Arthur J. Schwab (born 1946), United States federal judge
- Arthur Tell Schwab (1896–1945), Swiss race walker
