= W. H. Seward Thomson =

American judge

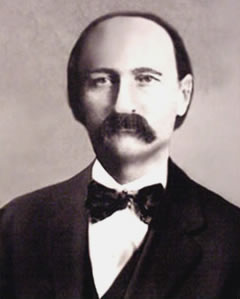

Senior Judge of the United States District Court for the Western District of Pennsylvania
- In office February 21, 1928 – November 29, 1932

Judge of the United States District Court for the Western District of Pennsylvania
- In office July 21, 1914 – February 21, 1928
- Appointed by: Woodrow Wilson
- Preceded by: James Scott Young
- Succeeded by: Nelson McVicar

Personal details
- Born: W. H. Seward Thomson; December 16, 1856 Beaver County, Pennsylvania
- Died: November 29, 1932 (aged 75)
- Education: Washington and Lee University; Marshall College read law

W. H. Seward Thomson (December 16, 1856 – November 29, 1932) was a United States district judge of the United States District Court for the Western District of Pennsylvania.

== Education and career ==
Born in Beaver County, Pennsylvania, Thomson attended Washington and Jefferson College, and Marshall College (now Marshall University) in Huntington, West Virginia before reading law to enter the bar in 1880. He was in private practice in Beaver, Pennsylvania from 1881 to 1894, and then in Pittsburgh, Pennsylvania until 1914.

== Federal judicial service ==
On July 7, 1914, Thomson was nominated by President Woodrow Wilson to a seat on the United States District Court for the Western District of Pennsylvania vacated by Judge James Scott Young. Thomson was confirmed by the United States Senate on July 21, 1914, and received his commission the same day. He assumed senior status on February 21, 1928, serving in that capacity until his death on November 29, 1932.

== Sources ==
Legal offices
Preceded by James Scott Young	Judge of the United States District Court for the Western District of Pennsylvania; 1914–1928	Succeeded by Nelson McVicar
