= James Scott Young =

American judge

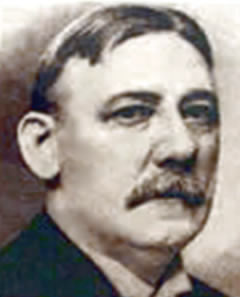

Judge of the United States District Court for the Western District of Pennsylvania
- In office January 22, 1908 – February 25, 1914
- Appointed by: Theodore Roosevelt
- Preceded by: Nathaniel Ewing
- Succeeded by: W. H. Seward Thomson

Personal details
- Born: James Scott Young; December 3, 1848 Pittsburgh, Pennsylvania
- Died: February 25, 1914 (aged 65)
- Education: Washington & Jefferson College (A.B.) read law

James Scott Young (December 3, 1848 – February 25, 1914) was a United States district judge of the United States District Court for the Western District of Pennsylvania.

== Education and career ==
Born in Pittsburgh, Pennsylvania, Young received an Artium Baccalaureus degree from Washington & Jefferson College in 1869 and read law to enter the bar in 1872. He was in private practice in Pittsburgh from 1872 to 1902. He was the United States Attorney for the Western District of Pennsylvania from 1902 to 1905. He was a Judge of the Court of Common Pleas of Allegheny County, Pennsylvania from 1905 to 1908.

== Federal judicial service ==
On January 14, 1908, Young was nominated by President Theodore Roosevelt to a seat on the United States District Court for the Western District of Pennsylvania vacated by Judge Nathaniel Ewing. Young was confirmed by the United States Senate on January 22, 1908, and received his commission the same day, serving in that capacity until his death on February 25, 1914.

== Sources ==
Legal offices
Preceded by Nathaniel Ewing	Judge of the United States District Court for the Western District of Pennsylvania; 1908–1914	Succeeded by W. H. Seward Thomson
