= Paul Allen Simmons =

American judge

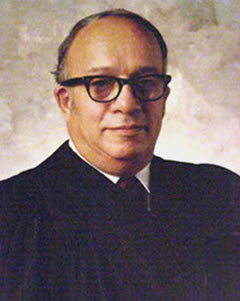

Senior Judge of the United States District Court for the Western District of Pennsylvania
- In office June 1, 1990 – October 9, 2014

Judge of the United States District Court for the Western District of Pennsylvania
- In office April 7, 1978 – June 1, 1990
- Appointed by: Jimmy Carter
- Preceded by: Ralph Francis Scalera
- Succeeded by: Timothy K. Lewis

Personal details
- Born: Paul Allen Simmons; August 31, 1921 Monongahela, Pennsylvania
- Died: October 9, 2014 (aged 93) Monongahela, Pennsylvania
- Education: University of Pittsburgh (BA); Harvard Law School (JD)

Paul Allen Simmons (August 31, 1921 – October 9, 2014) was a United States district judge of the United States District Court for the Western District of Pennsylvania.

== Education and career ==
Born in Monongahela, Pennsylvania, on August 31, 1921, Simmons received a Bachelor of Arts degree from the University of Pittsburgh in 1946 and a Juris Doctor from Harvard Law School in 1949.

He was a professor at the South Carolina State University School of Law in Orangeburg, South Carolina, from 1949 to 1952. He was a professor at the North Carolina Central University School of Law in Durham, North Carolina, from 1952 to 1956.

Subsequently a lawyer in private practice in Monongahela from 1956 to 1973, he was then appointed as a judge of the Washington County Court of Common Pleas in Pennsylvania, a position he held from 1973 to 1978.

== Federal judicial service ==
Simmons was nominated by President Jimmy Carter on January 26, 1978, to a seat on the United States District Court for the Western District of Pennsylvania vacated by Judge Ralph Francis Scalera. He was confirmed by the United States Senate on April 6, 1978, and received his commission on April 7, 1978. He assumed senior status on June 1, 1990. He died on October 9, 2014, in Monongahela.

== See also ==
- List of African-American federal judges
- List of African-American jurists
- List of first minority male lawyers and judges in Pennsylvania

== Sources ==
Legal offices
Preceded by Ralph Francis Scalera	Judge of the United States District Court for the Western District of Pennsylvania; 1978–1990	Succeeded by Timothy K. Lewis
