= John Lester Miller =

American judge

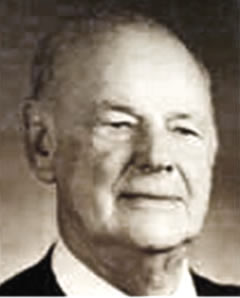

Senior Judge of the United States District Court for the Western District of Pennsylvania
- In office October 1, 1971 – July 20, 1978

Judge of the United States District Court for the Western District of Pennsylvania
- In office May 20, 1954 – October 1, 1971
- Appointed by: Dwight D. Eisenhower
- Preceded by: William Alvah Stewart
- Succeeded by: Ralph Francis Scalera

Personal details
- Born: John Lester Miller; March 24, 1901 Pittsburgh, Pennsylvania
- Died: July 20, 1978 (aged 77)
- Education: Westminster College (B.S.); University of Pittsburgh School of Law (LL.B.)

John Lester Miller (March 24, 1901 – July 20, 1978) was a United States district judge of the United States District Court for the Western District of Pennsylvania.

== Education and career ==
Born in Pittsburgh, Pennsylvania, Miller received a Bachelor of Science degree from Westminster College in 1923 and a Bachelor of Laws from the University of Pittsburgh School of Law in 1926. He was in private practice in Pittsburgh from 1926 to 1954.

== Federal judicial service ==
On March 29, 1954, Miller was nominated by President Dwight D. Eisenhower to a seat on the United States District Court for the Western District of Pennsylvania vacated by Judge William Alvah Stewart. Miller was confirmed by the United States Senate on May 18, 1954, and received his commission on May 20, 1954. He assumed senior status on October 1, 1971, serving in that capacity until his death on July 20, 1978.

== Sources ==
Legal offices
Preceded by William Alvah Stewart	Judge of the United States District Court for the Western District of Pennsylvania; 1954–1971	Succeeded by Ralph Francis Scalera
