= Herbert Peter Sorg =

American judge

Herbert P. Sorg
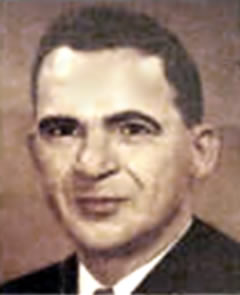

Senior Judge of the United States District Court for the Western District of Pennsylvania
- In office December 20, 1976 – March 11, 1979

Chief Judge of the United States District Court for the Western District of Pennsylvania
- In office 1975–1976
- Preceded by: Rabe Ferguson Marsh Jr.
- Succeeded by: Gerald Joseph Weber

Judge of the United States District Court for the Western District of Pennsylvania
- In office August 1, 1955 – December 20, 1976
- Appointed by: Dwight D. Eisenhower
- Preceded by: Seat established by 68 Stat. 8
- Succeeded by: Alan Neil Bloch

123rd Speaker of the Pennsylvania House of Representatives
- In office 1949–1952
- Preceded by: Franklin H. Lichtenwalter
- Succeeded by: Charles C. Smith

Personal details
- Born: Herbert Peter Sorg; December 19, 1911 St. Mary's, Pennsylvania
- Died: March 11, 1979 (aged 67)
- Party: Republican
- Education: Duquesne University School of Law (LL.B.)

Herbert Peter Sorg (December 19, 1911 – March 11, 1979) was a Speaker of the Pennsylvania House of Representatives and later a United States district judge of the United States District Court for the Western District of Pennsylvania.

== Education and career ==
Born in St. Mary's, Pennsylvania, Sorg received a Bachelor of Laws from Duquesne University School of Law in 1935. He was in private practice of law in St. Mary's from 1935 to 1955. He was Republican member of the Pennsylvania House of Representatives from 1940 to 1953, serving as majority whip from 1945 to 1947, majority leader in 1947, and Speaker from 1947 to 1953.

== Federal judicial service ==
On May 20, 1955, Sorg was nominated by President Dwight D. Eisenhower to a new seat on the United States District Court for the Western District of Pennsylvania created by 68 Stat. 8. He was confirmed by the United States Senate on July 29, 1955, and received his commission on August 1, 1955. He served as Chief Judge from 1975 to 1976, and assumed senior status on December 20, 1976. He was a Judge of the Temporary Emergency Court of Appeals from 1977 to 1979. He remained in senior status until his death on March 11, 1979.

== See also ==
- List of Pennsylvania state legislatures

== Sources ==
Political offices
Preceded by Franklin H. Lichtenwalter	Speaker of the Pennsylvania House of Representatives; 1949–1952	Succeeded by Charles C. Smith
Legal offices
Preceded by Seat established by 68 Stat. 8	Judge of the United States District Court for the Western District of Pennsylvania; 1955–1976	Succeeded by Alan Neil Bloch
Preceded by Rabe Ferguson Marsh Jr.	Chief Judge of the United States District Court for the Western District of Pennsylvania; 1975–1976	Succeeded by Gerald Joseph Weber
