= Wallace Samuel Gourley =

American judge

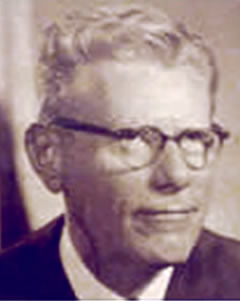

Senior Judge of the United States District Court for the Western District of Pennsylvania
- In office August 4, 1969 – September 23, 1976

Chief Judge of the United States District Court for the Western District of Pennsylvania
- In office 1951–1969
- Preceded by: Nelson McVicar
- Succeeded by: Rabe Ferguson Marsh Jr.

Judge of the United States District Court for the Western District of Pennsylvania
- In office November 29, 1945 – August 4, 1969
- Appointed by: Harry S. Truman
- Preceded by: Frederic Palen Schoonmaker
- Succeeded by: Hubert Irving Teitelbaum

Personal details
- Born: Wallace Samuel Gourley; August 4, 1904 Wellsville, Ohio
- Died: September 23, 1976 (aged 72)
- Education: Ohio State University Moritz College of Law (LL.B.)

Wallace Samuel Gourley (August 4, 1904 – September 23, 1976) was a United States district judge of the United States District Court for the Western District of Pennsylvania.

== Education and career ==
Born in Wellsville, Ohio, Gourley received a Bachelor of Laws from Ohio State University Moritz College of Law in 1929. He was in private practice in Washington, Pennsylvania from 1929 to 1936. He was an Investigator for the Retail Credit Company (now Equifax) in Washington, Pennsylvania from 1929 to 1936. He was first assistant district attorney of Washington County, Pennsylvania from 1936 to 1944. He was a member of the Pennsylvania State Senate from 1941 to 1945.

== Federal judicial service ==
On November 2, 1945, Gourley was nominated by President Harry S. Truman to a seat on the United States District Court for the Western District of Pennsylvania, vacated by Judge Frederic Palen Schoonmaker. Gourley was confirmed by the United States Senate on November 20, 1945, and received his commission on November 29, 1945. He served as Chief Judge from 1951 to 1969 and as a member of the Judicial Conference of the United States from 1968 to 1970, assuming senior status on August 4, 1969. Gourley served in that capacity until his death on September 23, 1976.

== Sources ==
Legal offices
Preceded by Frederic Palen Schoonmaker	Judge of the United States District Court for the Western District of Pennsylvania; 1945–1969	Succeeded by Hubert Irving Teitelbaum
Preceded by Nelson McVicar	Chief Judge of the United States District Court for the Western District of Pennsylvania; 1951–1969	Succeeded by Rabe Ferguson Marsh Jr.
