= Ralph Francis Scalera =

American judge

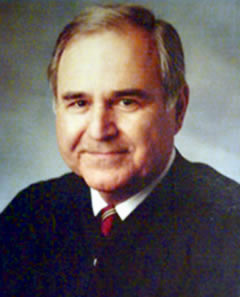

Judge of the United States District Court for the Western District of Pennsylvania
- In office November 30, 1971 – May 1, 1976
- Appointed by: Richard Nixon
- Preceded by: John Lester Miller
- Succeeded by: Paul Allen Simmons

Personal details
- Born: Ralph Francis Scalera; June 28, 1930 Midland, Pennsylvania
- Died: January 27, 2011 (aged 80) Beaver, Pennsylvania
- Party: Republican
- Education: Harvard College (A.B.); University of Pennsylvania Law School (LL.B.)

Ralph Francis Scalera (June 28, 1930 – January 27, 2011) was a United States district judge of the United States District Court for the Western District of Pennsylvania.

== Education and career ==
Scalera was born in Midland, Pennsylvania and attended Midland High School. He received an Artium Baccalaureus degree from Harvard College in 1952 and a Bachelor of Laws from the University of Pennsylvania Law School in 1955. He was in the United States Army Counter Intelligence Corps from September 1955 to September 1957, after which time he went into private practice in Beaver, Pennsylvania from 1957 to 1959. Scalera later served as an Assistant United States Attorney of the Western District of Pennsylvania, from 1959 to 1961, and a judge of the Court of Common Pleas of Beaver County, from 1964 to 1970. He was the Presiding Judge of the Common Pleas Court from 1966 to 1970, before again returning to private practice. Scalera was the Republican Party nominee for Lieutenant Governor of Pennsylvania in 1970.

== Federal judicial service ==
Scalera was nominated by President Richard Nixon on November 12, 1971, to a seat on the United States District Court for the Western District of Pennsylvania vacated by Judge John Lester Miller. He was confirmed by the United States Senate on November 23, 1971, and received his commission on November 30, 1971. His service terminated on May 1, 1976, due to his resignation.

== Post judicial service ==
After his resignation, Scalera returned to private practice in Pittsburgh. He died on January 27, 2011, in Beaver.

== Sources ==
Party political offices
Preceded by Raymond J. Broderick	Republican nominee for Lieutenant Governor of Pennsylvania; 1970	Succeeded by Kenneth B. Lee
Legal offices
Preceded by John Lester Miller	Judge of the United States District Court for the Eastern District of Pennsylvania; 1971–1976	Succeeded by Paul Allen Simmons
