= Gustave Diamond =

American judge (1928–2021)

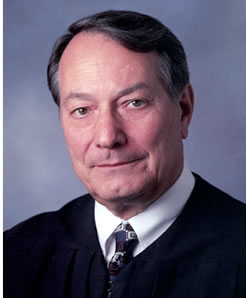

Senior Judge of the United States District Court for the Western District of Pennsylvania
- In office January 31, 1994 – October 30, 2021

Chief Judge of the United States District Court for the Western District of Pennsylvania
- In office 1992–1994
- Preceded by: Maurice Blanchard Cohill Jr.
- Succeeded by: Donald Emil Ziegler

Judge of the United States District Court for the Western District of Pennsylvania
- In office May 2, 1978 – January 31, 1994
- Appointed by: Jimmy Carter
- Preceded by: Edward Dumbauld
- Succeeded by: Robert J. Cindrich

United States Attorney for the Western District of Pennsylvania
- In office 1963–1969
- Appointed by: John F. Kennedy
- Preceded by: Joseph S. Ammerman
- Succeeded by: Dick Thornburgh

Personal details
- Born: January 29, 1928 Burgettstown, Pennsylvania
- Died: October 30, 2021 (aged 93) McMurray, Pennsylvania
- Education: Duke University (AB); Duquesne University School of Law (JD)

Gustave Diamond (January 29, 1928 – October 30, 2021) was a United States district judge of the United States District Court for the Western District of Pennsylvania.

== Education and career ==
Born in Burgettstown, Pennsylvania, Diamond was in the United States Navy from 1946 to 1948. He received an Artium Baccalaureus degree from Duke University in 1951 and a Juris Doctor from Duquesne University School of Law in 1956. He was a law clerk to Judge Rabe Ferguson Marsh Jr. of the United States District Court for the Western District of Pennsylvania from 1956 to 1961. He was an Assistant United States Attorney of the Western District of Pennsylvania from 1961 to 1963. He was the United States Attorney for the Western District of Pennsylvania from 1963 to 1969. He was in private practice in Pittsburgh, Pennsylvania from 1969 to 1975. He was in private practice in Washington, Pennsylvania from 1976 to 1978.

== Federal judicial service ==
Diamond was nominated by President Jimmy Carter on March 22, 1978, to the United States District Court for the Western District of Pennsylvania, to a seat vacated by Judge Edward Dumbauld. He was confirmed by the United States Senate on May 1, 1978, and received his commission on May 2, 1978. He served as Chief Judge from 1992 to 1994. He assumed senior status on January 31, 1994. He was succeeded by Judge Robert J. Cindrich.

== Death ==
Diamond died on October 30, 2021, at his home in McMurray, Pennsylvania, at the age of 93, following 43 years of judicial service.

== Sources ==
Legal offices
Preceded by Edward Dumbauld	Judge of the United States District Court for the Western District of Pennsylvania; 1978–1994	Succeeded by Robert J. Cindrich
Preceded by Maurice Blanchard Cohill Jr.	Chief Judge of the United States District Court for the Western District of Pennsylvania; 1992–1994	Succeeded by Donald Emil Ziegler
