= Kim R. Gibson =

American judge (1948–2025)

Kim Richard Gibson
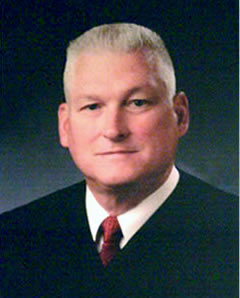

Senior Judge of the United States District Court for the Western District of Pennsylvania
- In office June 3, 2016 – May 30, 2025

Judge of the United States District Court for the Western District of Pennsylvania
- In office September 23, 2003 – June 3, 2016
- Appointed by: George W. Bush
- Preceded by: D. Brooks Smith
- Succeeded by: Nicholas Ranjan

Personal details
- Born: Kim Richard Gibson; May 29, 1948 Trenton, New Jersey, U.S.
- Died: May 30, 2025 (aged 77) Somerset, Pennsylvania, U.S.
- Education: United States Military Academy (BS); Dickinson School of Law (JD)

Military service
- Allegiance: United States
- Branch/service: United States Army
- Years of service: 1970–1996
- Rank: Colonel
- Unit: Judge Advocate General's Corps, United States Army

Kim Richard Gibson (May 29, 1948 – May 30, 2025) was a United States district judge of the United States District Court for the Western District of Pennsylvania.

== Early life and education ==
Born in Trenton, New Jersey on May 29, 1948, Gibson received a Bachelor of Science degree from the United States Military Academy at West Point in 1970, and a Juris Doctor, magna cum laude, from the Dickinson School of Law, (now known as Pennsylvania State University - Dickinson Law), in 1975. He was an editor of the Dickinson Law Review. He was commissioned as a second lieutenant in the United States Army in June 1970 and following completion of airborne and ranger training, he served as an armor officer until October 1975.

== Early legal career ==
Gibson attended The JAG School at the University of Virginia and entered U.S. Army JAG Corps. He served as JAG officer until August 1978. Following his release from active duty he continued to serve in the United States Army Reserve and retired as a Colonel, JAG, USAR in 1996. In 1991, he and his JAG Detachment were activated during the first Gulf War.

Gibson was in private practice as a sole practitioner in Somerset, Pennsylvania, from 1978 through 1997. During that time he served as a public defender, attorney for Children and Youth Services, solicitor for a school district and various municipalities, and as solicitor for Somerset County.

=== State judicial career ===
Gibson was elected to the Somerset County Court of Common Pleas in 1997. During his time on the common pleas bench, he was instrumental in establishing Victim Impact Panels and Juvenile Drug Court (only the second such court in Pennsylvania).

== Federal judicial service ==
On April 28, 2003, Gibson was nominated by President George W. Bush to a seat on the United States District Court for the Western District of Pennsylvania vacated by D. Brooks Smith. Gibson was confirmed by the United States Senate on September 23, 2003, and received his commission the following day. Gibson assumed senior status on June 3, 2016. His judicial service ended upon his death on May 30, 2025, at the age of 77.

In April 2017, Gibson was reversed by a unanimous panel of the United States Court of Appeals for the Third Circuit after he rejected the claims under the Eighth Amendment to the United States Constitution made by the parents of a mentally ill prisoner who had committed suicide after being segregated into solitary confinement.

Legal offices
Preceded by D. Brooks Smith	Judge of the United States District Court for the Western District of Pennsylvania; 2003–2016	Succeeded by Nicholas Ranjan
