= Donald Emil Ziegler =

American judge (1936–2019)

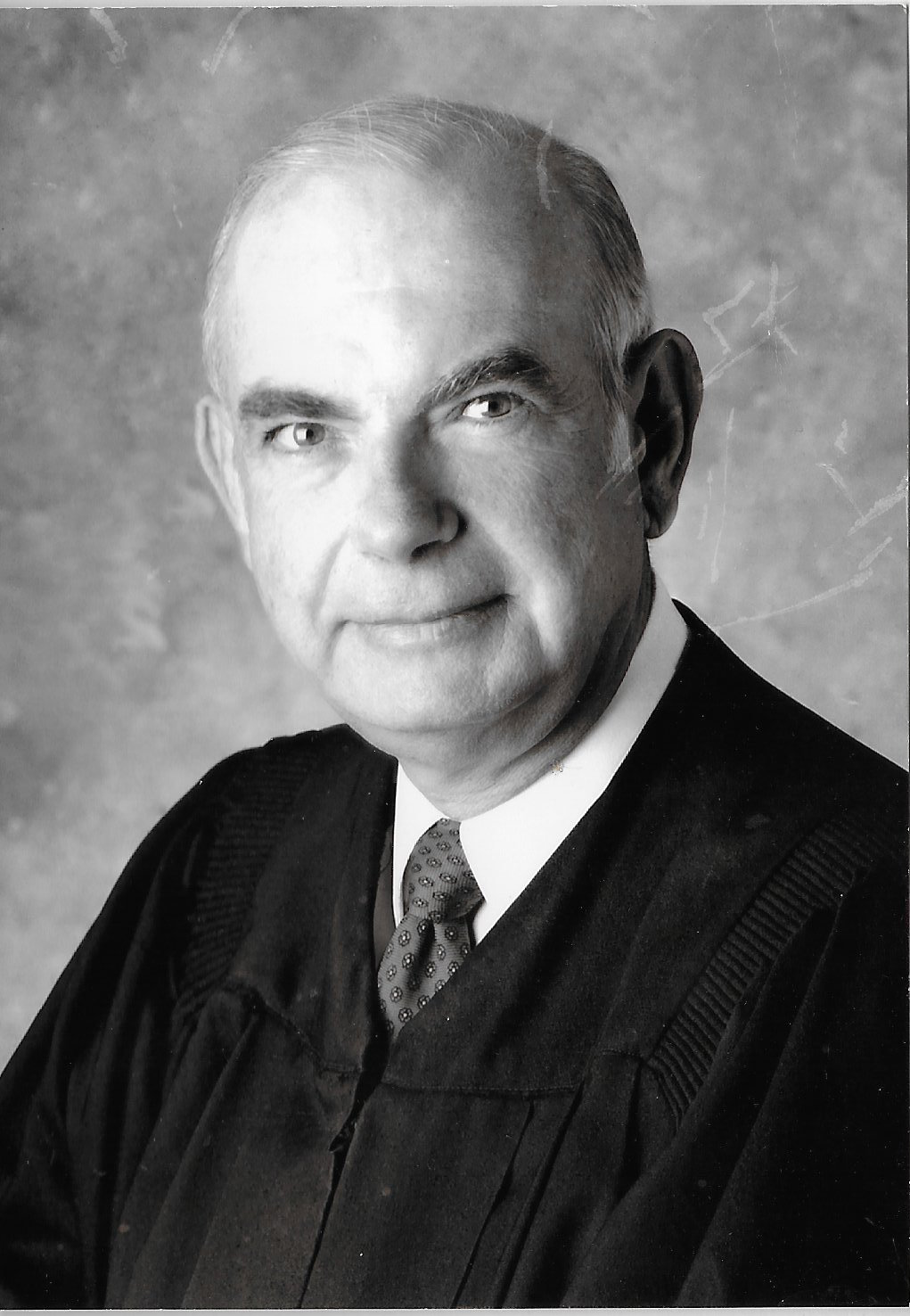

Senior Judge of the United States District Court for the Western District of Pennsylvania
- In office October 1, 2001 – May 31, 2003

Chief Judge of the United States District Court for the Western District of Pennsylvania
- In office 1994–2001
- Preceded by: Gustave Diamond
- Succeeded by: D. Brooks Smith

Judge of the United States District Court for the Western District of Pennsylvania
- In office May 2, 1978 – October 1, 2001
- Appointed by: Jimmy Carter
- Preceded by: Rabe Ferguson Marsh Jr.
- Succeeded by: Terrence F. McVerry

Personal details
- Born: Donald Emil Ziegler; October 1, 1936 Pittsburgh, Pennsylvania, U.S.
- Died: September 21, 2019 (aged 82) Upper St. Clair Township, Pennsylvania, U.S.
- Education: Duquesne University (BA); Georgetown University Law Center (LLB)

Donald Emil Ziegler (October 1, 1936 – September 21, 2019) was a former United States district judge of the United States District Court for the Western District of Pennsylvania.

== Education and career ==
Born in Pittsburgh, Pennsylvania, in 1936, Ziegler received a Bachelor of Arts degree from Duquesne University in 1958, and a Bachelor of Laws from Georgetown University Law Center in 1961, where he was a member of the Law Review. He was in private practice in Pittsburgh from 1962 to 1974. He served as a judge of the Court of Common Pleas, Allegheny County, Pennsylvania, from 1974 to 1978.

== Federal judicial service ==
On March 22, 1978, Ziegler was nominated by President Jimmy Carter to a seat on the United States District Court for the Western District of Pennsylvania vacated by Judge Rabe Ferguson Marsh Jr. Ziegler was confirmed by the United States Senate on May 1, 1978, and received his commission the following day. He served as Chief Judge from 1994 to 2001. He assumed senior status on October 1, 2001, serving in that capacity until his retirement from the bench on May 31, 2003. Ziegler served as a member of the Judicial Conference of the United States for three years, and the Judicial Council of the Third Circuit for seven years. Along with being an outstanding Judge, Judge Ziegler was a great, kind, considerate and thoughtful mentor and professor to law students and new lawyers. He took his profession and position seriously but was compassionate to the human condition.

== Sources ==
Legal offices
Preceded by Rabe Ferguson Marsh Jr.	Judge of the United States District Court for the Western District of Pennsylvania; 1978–2001	Succeeded by Terrence F. McVerry
Preceded by Gustave Diamond	Chief Judge of the United States District Court for the Western District of Pennsylvania; 1994–2001	Succeeded by D. Brooks Smith
