= William Alvah Stewart =

American judge

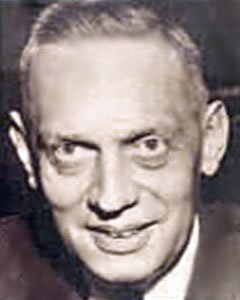

Judge of the United States District Court for the Western District of Pennsylvania
- In office April 25, 1951 – April 9, 1953
- Appointed by: Harry S. Truman
- Preceded by: Nelson McVicar
- Succeeded by: John Lester Miller

Personal details
- Born: William Alvah Stewart; August 16, 1903 Pittsburgh, Pennsylvania
- Died: April 9, 1953 (aged 49)
- Education: Amherst College (A.B.); Harvard Law School (LL.B.)

William Alvah Stewart (August 16, 1903 – April 9, 1953) was a United States district judge of the United States District Court for the Western District of Pennsylvania.

== Education and career ==
Stewart was born in Pittsburgh, Pennsylvania and graduated from Peabody High School. He received an Artium Baccalaureus degree from Amherst College in 1925 and a Bachelor of Laws from Harvard Law School in 1928. He was in private practice in Pittsburgh from 1928 to 1951, and was an instructor at Duquesne Law School from 1930 to 1942. He was an assistant city solicitor for Pittsburgh from 1934 to 1936, then an assistant county solicitor for Allegheny County, Pennsylvania from 1936 to 1938 before becoming city solicitor for Pittsburgh from 1938 to 1942. He was in the United States Army Judge Advocate General's Corps during World War II from 1942 to 1946 and became a lieutenant colonel. He was a member of the Pittsburgh City Council from 1946 to 1951, and a member of the Urban Redevelopment Authority of Pittsburgh from 1947 to 1951.

== Federal judicial service ==
On February 27, 1951, Stewart was nominated by President Harry S. Truman to a seat on the United States District Court for the Western District of Pennsylvania vacated by Judge Nelson McVicar. Stewart was confirmed by the United States Senate on April 24, 1951, and received his commission on April 25, 1951, serving in that capacity until his death on April 9, 1953.

He is buried at the Mount Royal Cemetery, Glenshaw, Pennsylvania.

== Sources ==
Legal offices
Preceded by Nelson McVicar	Judge of the United States District Court for the Western District of Pennsylvania; 1951–1953	Succeeded by John Lester Miller
