= Alan N. Bloch =

American judge (1932–2024)

Alan Neil Bloch
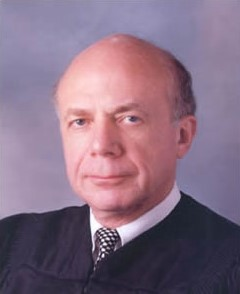
- Bloch in 2000

Senior Judge of the United States District Court for the Western District of Pennsylvania
- In office April 12, 1997 – October 6, 2024

Judge of the United States District Court for the Western District of Pennsylvania
- In office November 2, 1979 – April 12, 1997
- Appointed by: Jimmy Carter
- Preceded by: Herbert Peter Sorg
- Succeeded by: Joy Flowers Conti

Personal details
- Born: Alan Neil Bloch; April 12, 1932 Pittsburgh, Pennsylvania, U.S.
- Died: October 6, 2024 (aged 92) Scott Township, Allegheny County, Pennsylvania, U.S.
- Education: University of Pennsylvania (BS); University of Pittsburgh School of Law (JD)

Alan Neil Bloch (April 12, 1932 – October 6, 2024) was a United States district judge of the United States District Court for the Western District of Pennsylvania.

== Life and career ==
Bloch was born in Pittsburgh, Pennsylvania. He received a Bachelor of Science degree from the University of Pennsylvania in 1953 and, after serving as a lieutenant in the United States Army from 1953 to 1955, received a Juris Doctor from the University of Pittsburgh School of Law in 1958. He was in the Pennsylvania Army National Guard from 1955 to 1959, and in the United States Air Force Reserve from 1959 to 1963. He was in private practice in Pittsburgh from 1958 to 1979.

=== Federal judicial service ===
On August 3, 1979, Bloch was nominated by President Jimmy Carter to a seat on the United States District Court for the Western District of Pennsylvania vacated by Judge Herbert Peter Sorg. Bloch was confirmed by the United States Senate on October 31, 1979, and received his commission on November 2, 1979. He assumed senior status on April 12, 1997.

=== Death ===
Bloch died in Scott Township, Allegheny County, Pennsylvania, on October 6, 2024, at the age of 92.

== See also ==
- List of Jewish American jurists
- List of United States federal judges by longevity of service

== Sources ==
Legal offices
Preceded by Herbert Peter Sorg	Judge of the United States District Court for the Western District of Pennsylvania; 1979–1997	Succeeded by Joy Flowers Conti
