= Frederic Palen Schoonmaker =

American judge

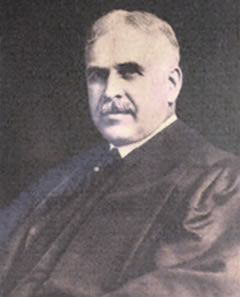

Judge of the United States District Court for the Western District of Pennsylvania
- In office December 22, 1922 – September 5, 1945
- Appointed by: Warren G. Harding
- Preceded by: Seat established by 42 Stat. 837
- Succeeded by: Wallace Samuel Gourley

Personal details
- Born: Frederic Palen Schoonmaker; March 11, 1870 Limestone, New York
- Died: September 5, 1945 (aged 75)
- Education: Cornell University (A.B.) read law

Frederic Palen Schoonmaker (March 11, 1870 – September 5, 1945) was a United States district judge of the United States District Court for the Western District of Pennsylvania.

== Education and career ==
Born in Limestone, New York, Schoonmaker received an Artium Baccalaureus degree from Cornell University in 1891 and read law to enter the bar in 1894. He was in private practice in Bradford, Pennsylvania from 1894 to 1913. He was a captain in the Pennsylvania National Guard from 1912 to 1917, and was a lieutenant colonel in the United States Army from 1917 to 1919. He returned to private practice in Bradford from 1919 to 1923.

== Federal judicial service ==
On December 20, 1922, Schoonmaker was nominated by President Warren G. Harding to a new seat on the United States District Court for the Western District of Pennsylvania created by 42 Stat. 837. He was confirmed by the United States Senate on December 22, 1922, and received his commission the same day. Schoonmaker served in that capacity until his death on September 5, 1945.

== Sources ==
Legal offices
Preceded by Seat established by 42 Stat. 837	Judge of the United States District Court for the Western District of Pennsylvania; 1922–1945	Succeeded by Wallace Samuel Gourley
