= Erie Federal Courthouse =

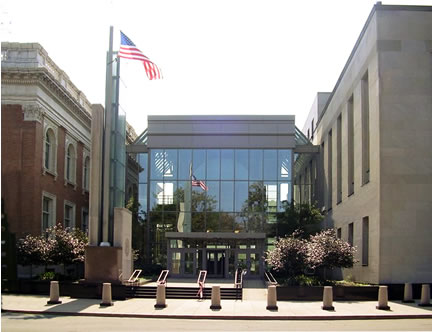
- The annex, situated between the former library and the original 1937 courthouse, is the main entrance into the complex.
- Interactive map of the Erie Federal Courthouse area

General information
- Location: 17 South Park Row, Erie, Pennsylvania, United States
- Coordinates: 42°7′44″N 80°5′3″W
- Client: United States District Court for the Western District of Pennsylvania, United States Post Office
- Owner: General Services Administration

Technical details
- Floor area: 109,046 square feet (10,131 m^{2})

- Erie Federal Courthouse and Post Office
- U.S. National Register of Historic Places
- Location: 617 State Street
- Built: 1937
- Architect: Rudolph Stanley-Brown, Louis A. Simon
- Architectural style: Moderne
- NRHP reference No.: 92000468
- Added to NRHP: January 22, 1993

The Erie Federal Courthouse and Post Office, also known as Erie Federal Courthouse, in Erie, Pennsylvania, is a complex of buildings that serve as a courthouse of the United States District Court for the Western District of Pennsylvania, and house other federal functions. The main courthouse building was built in 1937 in Moderne architecture style. It served historically as a courthouse, as a post office, and as a government office building. It was listed on the National Register of Historic Places in 1993.

By the late 1980s, the federal courts needed more space to effectively serve the public. To resolve the space shortage, the General Services Administration undertook a bold plan to purchase, restore, and adaptively use two adjacent historic buildings: the Main Library and the Isaac Baker & Son Clothing Store. The existing courthouse was rehabilitated and two additions were constructed. Each of the buildings in the complex is of a different architectural style.

== Building history ==
=== 1887 Courthouse ===
The first United States courthouse in Erie had been constructed at this location in 1888 under the supervision of Mifflin E. Bell., also in the service of the Western District of Pennsylvania. This building also served as a post office. It was demolished to make way for the existing 1938 courthouse.

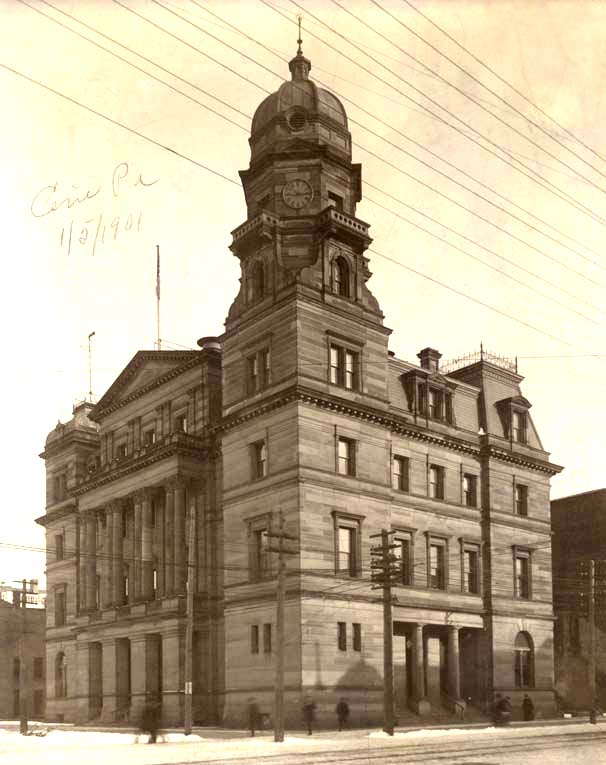
The first United States courthouse in Erie, completed in 1887, as it appeared in 1901. The building was demolished to make way for the current courthouse.

=== Buildings of the modern courthouse complex ===
The 1938 courthouse was designed by Rudolph Stanley-Brown, a Cleveland architect who was the grandson of President James A. Garfield. Built during the Great Depression with funds from New Deal programs, its construction provided local jobs. The building was listed in the National Register of Historic Places in 1993. However, the Erie Public Library, completed in 1899 and incorporated into the United States Courthouse complex in the 1990s, is the oldest building in the complex. The Library was designed by the firm of Alden & Harlow of Pittsburgh, and was individually listed in the National Register of Historic Places in 1979.

The 1947 Baker Building was originally a clothing store. Isaac Baker and Son established its first store in the 1850s at another downtown location. When fire destroyed an earlier building, the proprietor hired Erie architect Walter Monahan and consulting architect George Mayer of Cleveland to design a new building. Construction of the building occurred during the period 1943-1946 by the Henry Shenk Company, a prominent Erie general contractor. Shenk had constructed the adjacent Erie Library, over 40 years earlier, and his company was quite large when it began constructing the Baker Building. Work was stopped on the building shortly after it began, because of restrictions imposed by World War II; however, it resumed in 1945 and was substantially completed in 1946. The Baker Building was also determined eligible for listing in the National Register of Historic Places.

The new portions are the Courthouse Annex and the Connector, which unite the annex, library, and courthouse. Both are clearly modern. The design and restoration was completed in 2004 by DPK&A Architects and Kingsland Scott Bauer Associates.

== Architecture ==
The courthouse complex overlooks Perry Square, a park named to honor Admiral Oliver Hazard Perry. Other major buildings front the square, creating a monumental town center. The buildings that now comprise the courthouse complex have distinct architectural styles.

=== Main Library ===
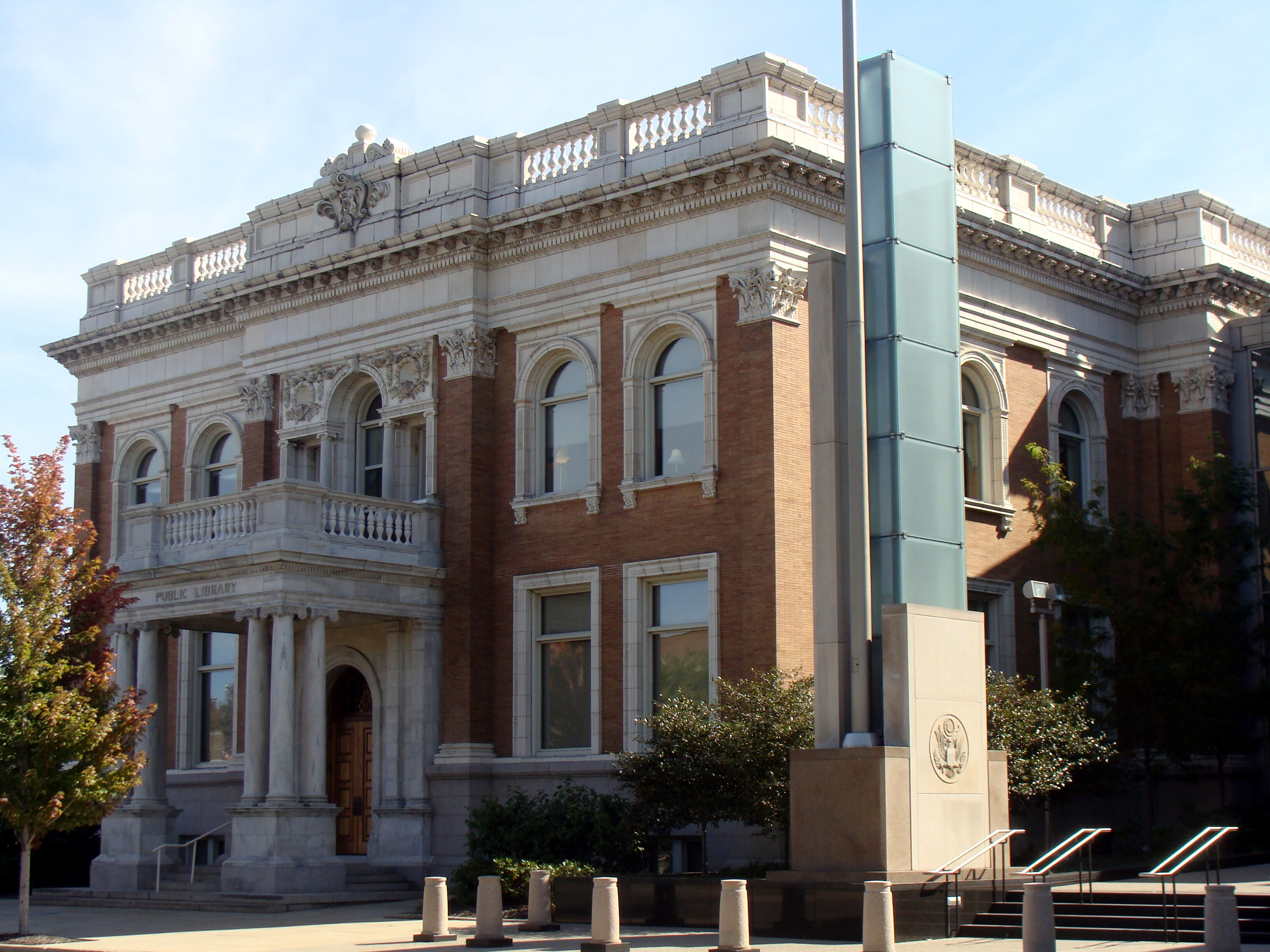
The Erie Public Library building

The Erie Public Library combines elements of the Beaux Arts Classicism and Second Renaissance Revival styles of architecture. Both were commonly used at the end of the nineteenth century to convey the importance of public buildings.

=== 1937 courthouse ===
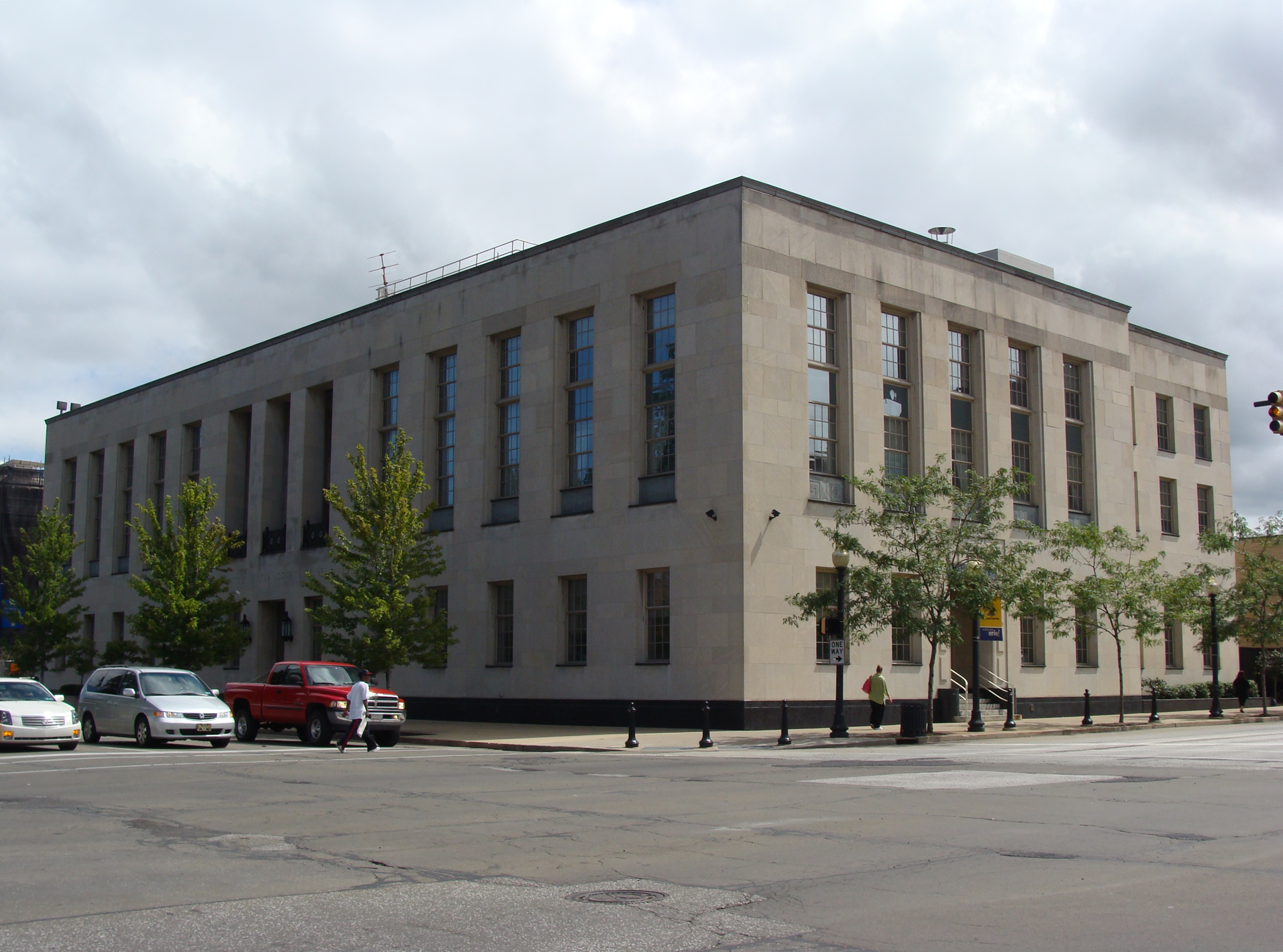
The 1937 courthouse building

The 1938 courthouse was designed in the Stripped Classical style, which was commonly used for Federal buildings constructed during the Great Depression. The building has the monumental scale and form of earlier classically inspired Federal architecture, but lavish ornamentation commonly found on buildings from previous eras is stripped away. The building is clad in Indiana limestone with polished black granite accenting the building base and entrance area. Carved soapstone panels with a Greek key motif are on the second level. On the interior, the vestibules, lobbies, and corridors are clad with blue terra-cotta wainscot. Ceramic tile floors are bordered with another Greek key pattern. Two original courtrooms remain and are elaborately finished with paneled wood wainscot. Two related sculptures entitled "American Youth" flank the courtrooms. Completed by sculptor Henry Kreis shortly after the building was completed, the minimal forms are compatible with the architectural style of the courthouse.

=== Baker Building ===
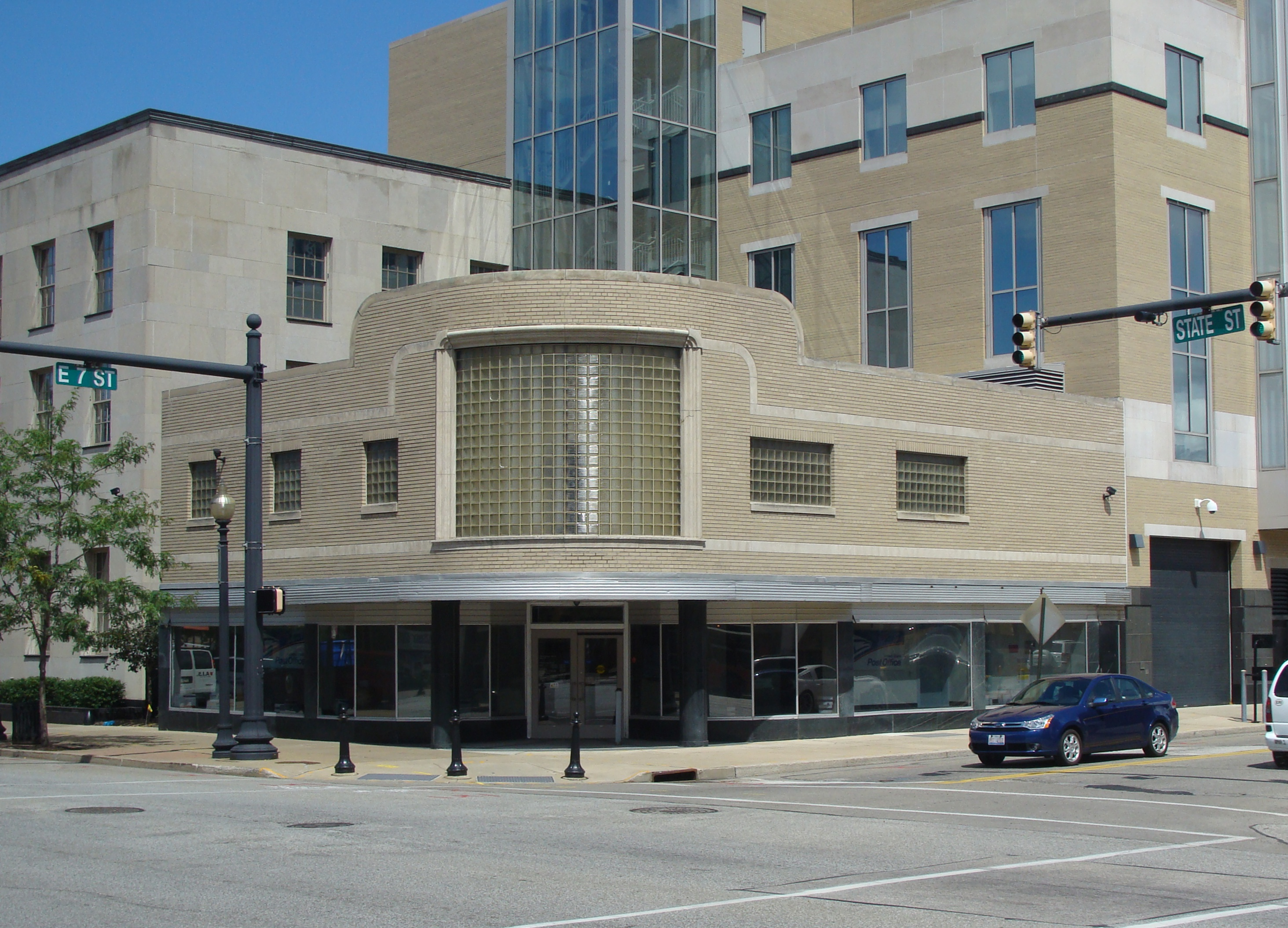
Intersection facing of the Baker Building

The Baker Building is a two-story Moderne style building, situated on the northeast corner of State and Seventh Streets. The Baker Building is one of the best surviving examples of the Art Moderne style of architecture found in Erie. It displays all of the character-defining features of the style, including rounded corners, curved glass-block panels, a metal canopy, and a flat roof. The façade is clad in buff-colored brick and is smooth and devoid of ornamentation, also common characteristics. Because of these significant architectural features, the Baker Building was integrated into the plan for the complex as a U.S. Post Office, although a portion of the rear was demolished.

Its massing is horizontal and rectangular, with a juxtaposed rounded corner facing the intersection. This is the focus of the building and it contains the sign "BAKER'S" at the top of the parapet, and the recessed entrance doors at street level. The corner of the building is supported on two black marble columns that contain flanking, recessed, curved display windows. The curving, horizontal lines of the corner are further reinforced with a cantilevered, brush-chrome canopy that starts on the east elevation and sweeps around to the north elevation. The center of the second floor at the rounded corner is articulated with a large, square, glass block opening that is backlit with vertical fluorescent lights. Elsewhere, the exterior of the building is devoid of ornamentation, except for several additional glass block openings on the second floor.

The plan of the shop utilizes strategically placed curved partitions to draw the shopper's eye deep into the store. Mezzanines, balconies, and two-story spaces are also positioned to break up the uniformity of the space and provide transition from a room on one level to other rooms on other levels. In addition, balcony railings are long and curving, and subtly evoke a nautical image.

The front (west) portion of the shop contains a rounded, two story entrance space that contains a second floor balcony from to gaze down, while upstairs. Directly behind this space is a retail area that contains, on its east end, a multilevel stairway designed to permits shoppers to climb a full flight up to the second floor above, or half a flight down or up to the retail areas in the rear of the store. Support spaces for tailoring, fitting, offices, and air handling were situated around the perimeter of the store. Aside from a small sign on the top of the cantilevered canopy, very little has changed in the building. The curving entrance on the corner, accentuated with the glass block, and the curved, multilevel spaces inside the building, were only minimally altered during the nearly five decades of commercial use. These features are distinctive, and combine to illustrate the Moderne style in its complete form.

The Moderne style of commercial architecture was not prominent in Erie, and no other examples known to survive display the level of completeness and intactness exhibited by the Baker Building.

== Significant events ==
- 1899: Library completed
- 1938: U.S Courthouse completed
- 1947: Baker Building completed
- 1979: Library listed in the National Register of Historic Places
- 1993: Courthouse listed in the National Register of Historic Places
- 2004: Construction and restoration of new U.S. Courthouse complex completed

== Building facts ==
- Location: Bounded by South Park Row, State Street, 7th Street, and French Street
- Architects:
  - Library: Alden & Harlow;
  - Federal Building: Rudolph Stanley-Brown;
  - Baker Building: Walter Monahan and George Mayer;
  - Connector and Annex: DPK&A Architects and Kingsland Scott Bauer Associates
- Construction dates:
  - Library: 1899;
  - Federal Building: 1938;
  - Baker Building: 1947;
  - Connector and Annex: 2004
- Landmark status: Library and Federal Building listed in the National Register of Historic Places; Baker Building eligible for listing in the National Register of Historic Places
- Architectural Styles:
  - Library: Beaux-Arts Classicism and Second Renaissance Revival;
  - Federal Building: Stripped Classical;
  - Baker Building: Art Moderne;
  - Connector and Annex: Modern Contemporary
- Primary materials:
  - Library: Pompeian red brick;
  - Federal Building: Indiana limestone;
  - Baker Building: buff-colored brick;
  - Connector and Annex: glass and Indiana limestone;
- Prominent features:
  - Library: rotunda with murals;
  - Federal Building: austere facade;
  - Baker Building: curved facade;
  - Connector and Annex: steel and 35' glass windows with geometric patterns

== See also ==
- List of United States federal courthouses
- National Register of Historic Places listings in Erie County, Pennsylvania
