= Hubert Teitelbaum =

American judge

Hubert Irving Teitelbaum
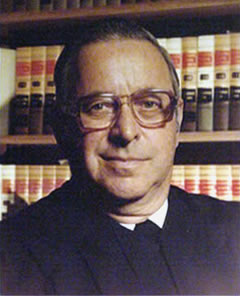

Senior Judge of the United States District Court for the Western District of Pennsylvania
- In office July 2, 1985 – January 5, 1995

Chief Judge of the United States District Court for the Western District of Pennsylvania
- In office 1982–1985
- Preceded by: Gerald Joseph Weber
- Succeeded by: Maurice Blanchard Cohill Jr.

Judge of the United States District Court for the Western District of Pennsylvania
- In office December 12, 1970 – July 2, 1985
- Appointed by: Richard Nixon
- Preceded by: Wallace Samuel Gourley
- Succeeded by: Donald J. Lee

Personal details
- Born: Hubert Irving Teitelbaum; July 2, 1915 Pittsburgh, Pennsylvania
- Died: January 5, 1995 (aged 79) Pittsburgh, Pennsylvania
- Education: University of Pittsburgh (A.B.); University of Pittsburgh School of Law (LL.B.)

Hubert Irving Teitelbaum (July 2, 1915 – January 5, 1995) was a United States district judge of the United States District Court for the Western District of Pennsylvania.

== Education and career ==
Born in Pittsburgh, he earned his B.A. degree from the University of Pittsburgh in 1937 and a Bachelor of Laws from the University of Pittsburgh School of Law in 1940. He was a special agent for the Federal Bureau of Investigation from 1940 to 1943. He was a captain in the United States Army during World War II and in its immediate aftermath, from 1944 to 1947. He was a division chief for the United States Department of the Army in the Federal Republic of Germany from 1947 to 1949.

He was in private practice in Pittsburgh from 1949 to 1955. He was the First Assistant United States Attorney for the Western District of Pennsylvania from 1955 to 1958. He was the United States Attorney for the Western District of Pennsylvania from 1958 to 1961. He was in private practice in Pittsburgh from 1961 to 1971. He was an adjunct professor of law at Duquesne University School of Law from 1977 to 1995.

== Federal judicial service ==
Teitelbaum was nominated by President Richard Nixon on November 24, 1970, to a seat on the United States District Court for the Western District of Pennsylvania vacated by Judge Wallace Samuel Gourley. He was confirmed by the United States Senate on December 11, 1970, and received his commission on December 12, 1970. He served as Chief Judge from 1982 to 1985. He assumed senior status on July 2, 1985. Teitelbaum served in that capacity until January 5, 1995, when he died of pneumonia at his home in Pittsburgh at the age of 79.

== Controversy ==
In 1988, Teitelbaum became the subject of worldwide attention due to his behavior, during a trial, toward an attorney named Barbara Wolvovitz. Specifically, in a court proceeding on Friday, July 8, 1988, Judge Teitelbaum ordered Wolvovitz, who used her maiden name as her surname, to use instead her husband's surname as her surname. Judge Teitelbaum told Wolvovitz that, if she did not comply with his order, she would "sleep in the county jail" that night. He then held Wolvovitz's co-counsel, Jon Pushinsky, in contempt of court for objecting to his order, sentencing Pushinsky to 30 days in jail, with the sentence to begin after the conclusion of the trial. During the same proceeding, Judge Teitelbaum also barred Pushinsky from using the title "Ms." when referring to a particular woman who had testified, saying later in the proceeding, "I ordinarily do not allow anyone to use that 'Ms.' in this courtroom."

When the trial reconvened on Monday, July 11, 1988, Wolvovitz moved for a mistrial. Judge Teitelbaum responded, "What if I call you sweetie?" He then said that he would address her as "counselor." He also vacated his contempt citation of Pushinsky.

On Wednesday, July 13, 1988, the Pittsburgh Post-Gazette published a front-page article about the court proceeding that had occurred the previous Friday. The following day, the Associated Press published an article about Judge Teitelbaum's conduct during the trial. Also on July 14, 1988, the Pittsburgh Post-Gazette published an editorial denouncing Judge Teitelbaum's behavior, calling it "blatant verbal bullying" and "shockingly sexist treatment."

On Friday, July 15, 1988, while the trial's jury was deliberating, Judge Teitelbaum apologized to Wolvovitz, saying, "I have always referred to married women by their married name. This is the way my generation was taught. I recognize your right to be addressed in any manner in which you see fit, and I apologize for my comments and the resulting situation."

On November 10, 1988, Judge Teitelbaum said that, three weeks earlier, he had told Maurice Blanchard Cohill Jr., the Chief Judge of the United States District Court for the Western District of Pennsylvania, that he would transfer most of his cases to other judges. He stated that he would keep his courtroom and would hear appeals in Social Security cases and appeals in criminal cases involving routine constitutional issues. Judge Teitelbaum said that he had taken this step "on [his] own volition and not because of anything connected with Ms. Wolvovitz." He stated, "I'm 73 years old and I think it's about time I ease up my trial schedule. There's no other reason."

== See also ==
- List of Jewish American jurists

== Sources ==
Legal offices
Preceded by Wallace Samuel Gourley	Judge of the United States District Court for the Western District of Pennsylvania; 1970–1985	Succeeded by Donald J. Lee
Preceded by Gerald Joseph Weber	Chief Judge of the United States District Court for the Western District of Pennsylvania; 1982–1985	Succeeded by Maurice Blanchard Cohill Jr.
