= David S. Cercone =

American judge (born 1952)

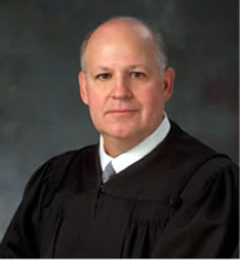

Senior Judge of the United States District Court for the Western District of Pennsylvania
- Incumbent
- Assumed office November 24, 2017

Judge of the United States District Court for the Western District of Pennsylvania
- In office August 2, 2002 – November 24, 2017
- Appointed by: George W. Bush
- Preceded by: Donald J. Lee
- Succeeded by: Stephanie L. Haines

Personal details
- Born: David Stewart Cercone; November 24, 1952 (age 73) Pittsburgh, Pennsylvania
- Party: Democrat
- Education: Westminster College (BA); Duquesne University School of Law (JD)

David Stewart Cercone (born November 24, 1952) is a senior United States district judge of the United States District Court for the Western District of Pennsylvania.

== Education and career ==
Born in Pittsburgh, Pennsylvania, Cercone received a Bachelor of Arts degree from Westminster College in 1974 and a Juris Doctor from Duquesne University School of Law in 1977. He was in private practice in Pennsylvania from 1978 to 1979, and again from 1982 to 1985, having served in the interim as a law clerk for Judge Paul R. Zavarella of the Allegheny County Court of Common Pleas from 1978 to 1979, and as an assistant district attorney of the Allegheny County District Attorney's Office from 1979 to 1981. He was also a Allegheny County District Magistrate Justice from 1982 to 1985, and began teaching as adjunct faculty at the University of Pittsburgh in 1983. He was a judge on the Allegheny County Court of Common Pleas from 1986 to 2002, during which time he also taught as adjunct faculty at Robert Morris College from 1993 to 1995.

== Federal District court service ==
On March 21, 2002, Cercone was nominated by President George W. Bush to a seat on the United States District Court for the Western District of Pennsylvania vacated by Donald J. Lee. Cercone was confirmed by the United States Senate on August 1, 2002, and received his commission on August 2, 2002. He assumed senior status on November 24, 2017.

== Sources ==
Legal offices
Preceded by Donald J. Lee	Judge of the United States District Court for the Western District of Pennsylvania; 2002–2017	Succeeded by Stephanie L. Haines
