= Gerald Joseph Weber =

American judge

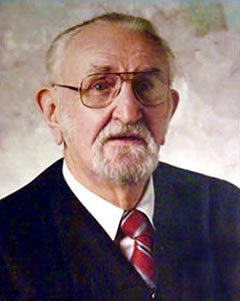

Senior Judge of the United States District Court for the Western District of Pennsylvania
- In office December 31, 1988 – August 28, 1989

Chief Judge of the United States District Court for the Western District of Pennsylvania
- In office 1976–1982
- Preceded by: Herbert Peter Sorg
- Succeeded by: Hubert Irving Teitelbaum

Judge of the United States District Court for the Western District of Pennsylvania
- In office September 15, 1964 – December 31, 1988
- Appointed by: Lyndon B. Johnson
- Preceded by: John Wilson McIlvaine
- Succeeded by: Donetta Ambrose

Personal details
- Born: Gerald Joseph Weber; February 1, 1914 Erie, Pennsylvania
- Died: August 28, 1989 (aged 75) Erie, Pennsylvania
- Education: Harvard University (A.B.); University of Pennsylvania Law School (LL.B.)

Gerald Joseph Weber (February 1, 1914 – August 28, 1989) was a United States district judge of the United States District Court for the Western District of Pennsylvania.

== Education and career ==
Born in Erie, Pennsylvania, Weber received an Artium Baccalaureus degree from Harvard University in 1936 and received his Bachelor of Laws from the University of Pennsylvania Law School in 1939. He was an Instructor at Gannon College in Erie from 1939 to 1941. He was in private law practice in Erie from 1940 to 1942. Beginning in 1942, he served in the United States Army as a Captain until 1946. From 1946 to 1947 he was a Chief of Counter-Intelligence for the United States War Department in Salzburg, Austria. After the war, he returned to private law practice in Erie from 1947 to 1964. During this period he also served as City Solicitor of Erie from 1950 to 1960.

== Federal judicial service ==
On April 30, 1964, Weber was nominated by President Lyndon B. Johnson to a seat on the United States District Court for the Western District of Pennsylvania vacated by Judge John Wilson McIlvaine. Weber was confirmed by the United States Senate on September 15, 1964, and received his commission the same day. Weber served as chief judge for the district court from 1976 to 1982. He assumed senior status on December 31, 1988, and remained active with the court until his death on August 28, 1989, in Erie.

== Notable cases ==
Among Weber's most significant rulings was a 1981 order that consolidated several suburban Pittsburgh school districts to end a racial discrimination lawsuit. He wrote a 1971 opinion in Mayo v. Satan and His Staff.

== Sources ==
Legal offices
Preceded by John Wilson McIlvaine	Judge of the United States District Court for the Western District of Pennsylvania; 1964–1988	Succeeded by Donetta Ambrose
Preceded by Herbert Peter Sorg	Chief Judge of the United States District Court for the Western District of Pennsylvania; 1976–1982	Succeeded by Hubert Irving Teitelbaum
