= Robert Murray Gibson =

American judge (1869–1949)

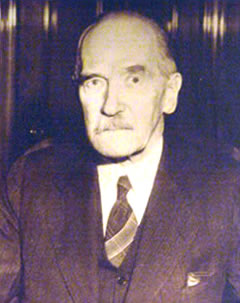

Senior Judge of the United States District Court for the Western District of Pennsylvania
- In office January 31, 1949 – December 19, 1949

Chief Judge of the United States District Court for the Western District of Pennsylvania
- In office 1948–1949
- Preceded by: Office established
- Succeeded by: Nelson McVicar

Judge of the United States District Court for the Western District of Pennsylvania
- In office July 24, 1922 – January 31, 1949
- Appointed by: Warren G. Harding
- Preceded by: Charles Prentiss Orr
- Succeeded by: Rabe Ferguson Marsh Jr.

Personal details
- Born: Robert Murray Gibson; August 20, 1869 Duncansville, Pennsylvania, U.S.
- Died: December 19, 1949 (aged 80) Pittsburgh, Pennsylvania, U.S.
- Resting place: Homewood Cemetery; Pittsburgh, Pennsylvania
- Education: Washington & Jefferson College (A.B.) read law
- Baseball career
- Pitcher
- Batted: Right Threw: Right

MLB debut
- June 4, 1890, for the Chicago Colts

Last MLB appearance
- August 7, 1890, for the Pittsburgh Alleghenys

MLB statistics
- Win–loss record: 1–3
- Earned run average: 9.86
- Strikeouts: 4
- Stats at Baseball Reference

Teams
- Chicago Colts (1890); Pittsburgh Alleghenys (1890)

Robert Murray Gibson (August 20, 1869 – December 19, 1949) was a United States district judge of the United States District Court for the Western District of Pennsylvania. Prior to his legal career, he briefly played professional baseball for the Chicago Colts and Pittsburgh Alleghenys.

== Early life and education ==
Born in Duncansville, Pennsylvania, Gibson received an Artium Baccalaureus degree from Washington & Jefferson College in 1889.

== Baseball career ==
After graduating from college, Gibson joined Cap Anson's Chicago Colts as a pitcher, making his big league debut on June 4, 1890 at the age of twenty. The 6'3", 185-pound right-hander pitched only one game for the Colts, a complete game win, before moving to the Pittsburgh Alleghenys, where he lost all three of his starts. In 21 innings of work, he had an ERA of 9.86. He walked 25 and struck out only four. As a hitter, Gibson had a .176 batting average in seventeen at-bats. He committed a total of five errors, two of which were from when he spent time in the outfield.

== Career ==
Gibson read law to enter the bar in 1894. He was an Assistant United States Attorney for the Western District of Pennsylvania from 1904 to 1914 and a special assistant to the United States Attorney General from 1912 to 1913. He was an assistant district attorney of Allegheny County, Pennsylvania from 1914 to 1922.

== Federal judicial service ==
On July 18, 1922, Gibson was nominated by President Warren G. Harding to a seat on the United States District Court for the Western District of Pennsylvania vacated by Judge Charles Prentiss Orr. Gibson was confirmed by the United States Senate on July 24, 1922, and received his commission the same day. He served as Chief Judge from 1948 to 1949, assuming senior status on January 31, 1949. Gibson served in that capacity for less than a year, until his death on December 19, 1949, in Pittsburgh, Pennsylvania. He was interred in Homewood Cemetery in Pittsburgh.

Legal offices
Preceded by Charles Prentiss Orr	Judge of the United States District Court for the Western District of Pennsylvania; 1922–1949	Succeeded by Rabe Ferguson Marsh Jr.
Preceded by Office established	Chief Judge of the United States District Court for the Western District of Pennsylvania; 1948–1949	Succeeded by Nelson McVicar
