= Nelson McVicar =

American judge

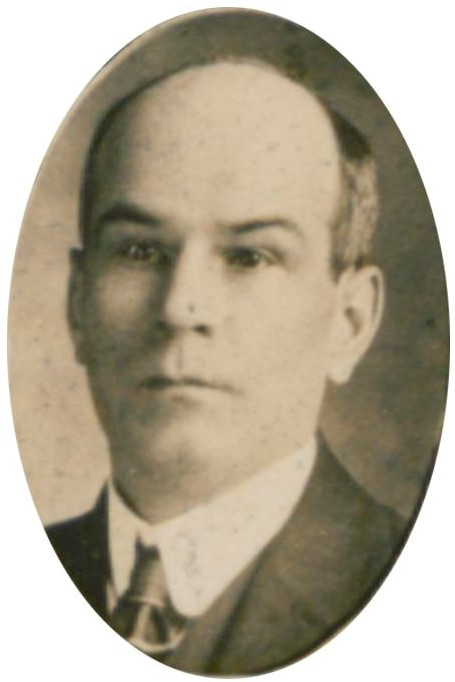

Senior Judge of the United States District Court for the Western District of Pennsylvania
- In office February 1, 1951 – December 20, 1960

Chief Judge of the United States District Court for the Western District of Pennsylvania
- In office 1949–1951
- Preceded by: Robert Murray Gibson
- Succeeded by: Wallace Samuel Gourley

Judge of the United States District Court for the Western District of Pennsylvania
- In office September 14, 1928 – February 1, 1951
- Appointed by: Calvin Coolidge
- Preceded by: W. H. Seward Thomson
- Succeeded by: William Alvah Stewart

Personal details
- Born: Nelson McVicar; January 25, 1871 Chatham, Ontario, Canada
- Died: December 20, 1960 (aged 89) Tarentum, Pennsylvania
- Education: University of Michigan Law School read law

Nelson McVicar (January 25, 1871 – December 20, 1960) was a United States district judge of the United States District Court for the Western District of Pennsylvania.

== Education and career ==
Born in Chatham (now Chatham-Kent), Ontario, Canada, McVicar attended the University of Michigan Law School and read law to enter the bar in 1896. From 1896 to 1925, he was in private practice in Pittsburgh, Pennsylvania, and was a borough solicitor for Tarentum Borough, Pennsylvania. He was a member of the Pennsylvania House of Representatives from 1914 to 1924, and was a Judge of the Court of Common Pleas for Allegheny County, Pennsylvania from 1925 to 1928.

== Federal judicial service ==
McVicar received a recess appointment from President Calvin Coolidge on September 14, 1928, to a seat on the United States District Court for the Western District of Pennsylvania vacated by Judge W. H. Seward Thomson. He was nominated to the same position by President Coolidge on December 6, 1928. He was confirmed by the United States Senate on December 17, 1928, and received his commission the same day. He served as Chief Judge from 1949 to 1951. He assumed senior status on February 1, 1951. His service terminated on December 20, 1960, due to his death in Tarentum.

== Sources ==
Legal offices
| Preceded by W. H. Seward Thomson | Judge of the United States District Court for the Western District of Pennsylvania; 1928–1951 | Succeeded by William Alvah Stewart |
| Preceded by Robert Murray Gibson | Chief Judge of the United States District Court for the Western District of Pennsylvania; 1949–1951 | Succeeded by Wallace Samuel Gourley |
