= Maurice B. Cohill Jr. =

American judge (1929–2022)

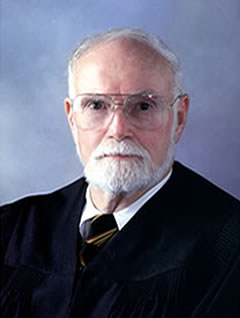

Senior Judge of the United States District Court for the Western District of Pennsylvania
- In office November 28, 1994 – January 1, 2022

Chief Judge of the United States District Court for the Western District of Pennsylvania
- In office 1985–1992
- Preceded by: Hubert Irving Teitelbaum
- Succeeded by: Gustave Diamond

Judge of the United States District Court for the Western District of Pennsylvania
- In office May 21, 1976 – November 28, 1994
- Appointed by: Gerald Ford
- Preceded by: Louis Rosenberg
- Succeeded by: Arthur J. Schwab

Personal details
- Born: Maurice Blanchard Cohill Jr. November 26, 1929 Pittsburgh, Pennsylvania, U.S.
- Died: January 1, 2022 (aged 92)
- Spouse(s): Suzanne Miller (died 1986); Anne D. Mullaney (died 2011)
- Children: 4
- Education: Princeton University (A.B.); University of Pittsburgh School of Law (LL.B.)

Maurice Blanchard Cohill Jr. (November 26, 1929 – January 1, 2022) was a United States district judge of the United States District Court for the Western District of Pennsylvania.

== Education and career ==
Born in Pittsburgh, Pennsylvania, Cohill received an Artium Baccalaureus degree from Princeton University in 1951 and a Bachelor of Laws from the University of Pittsburgh School of Law in 1956. He was a captain in the United States Marine Corps from 1951 to 1953. He was in private practice in Pittsburgh from 1956 to 1965. He was a judge of the Juvenile Court of Allegheny County, Pennsylvania from 1965 to 1968, and then of the Court of Common Pleas of that county until 1976.

== Federal judicial service ==
On May 4, 1976, Cohill was nominated by President Gerald Ford to a seat on the United States District Court for the Western District of Pennsylvania vacated by Judge Louis Rosenberg. Cohill was confirmed by the United States Senate on May 18, 1976, and received his commission on May 21, 1976. He served as Chief Judge from 1985 to 1992, and assumed senior status on November 28, 1994. He took inactive senior status in 2016, meaning that while he remained a federal judge, he no longer heard cases or participated in the business of the court.

== Personal life and death ==
Cohill died on January 1, 2022, at the age of 92. He was predeceased by both his wives and survived by his four children and eight grandchildren.

== See also ==
- List of United States federal judges by longevity of service

== Sources ==
Legal offices
Preceded by Louis Rosenberg	Judge of the United States District Court for the Western District of Pennsylvania; 1976–1994	Succeeded by Arthur J. Schwab
Preceded by Hubert Irving Teitelbaum	Chief Judge of the United States District Court for the Western District of Pennsylvania; 1985–1992	Succeeded by Gustave Diamond
