= Nathaniel Ewing =

American judge

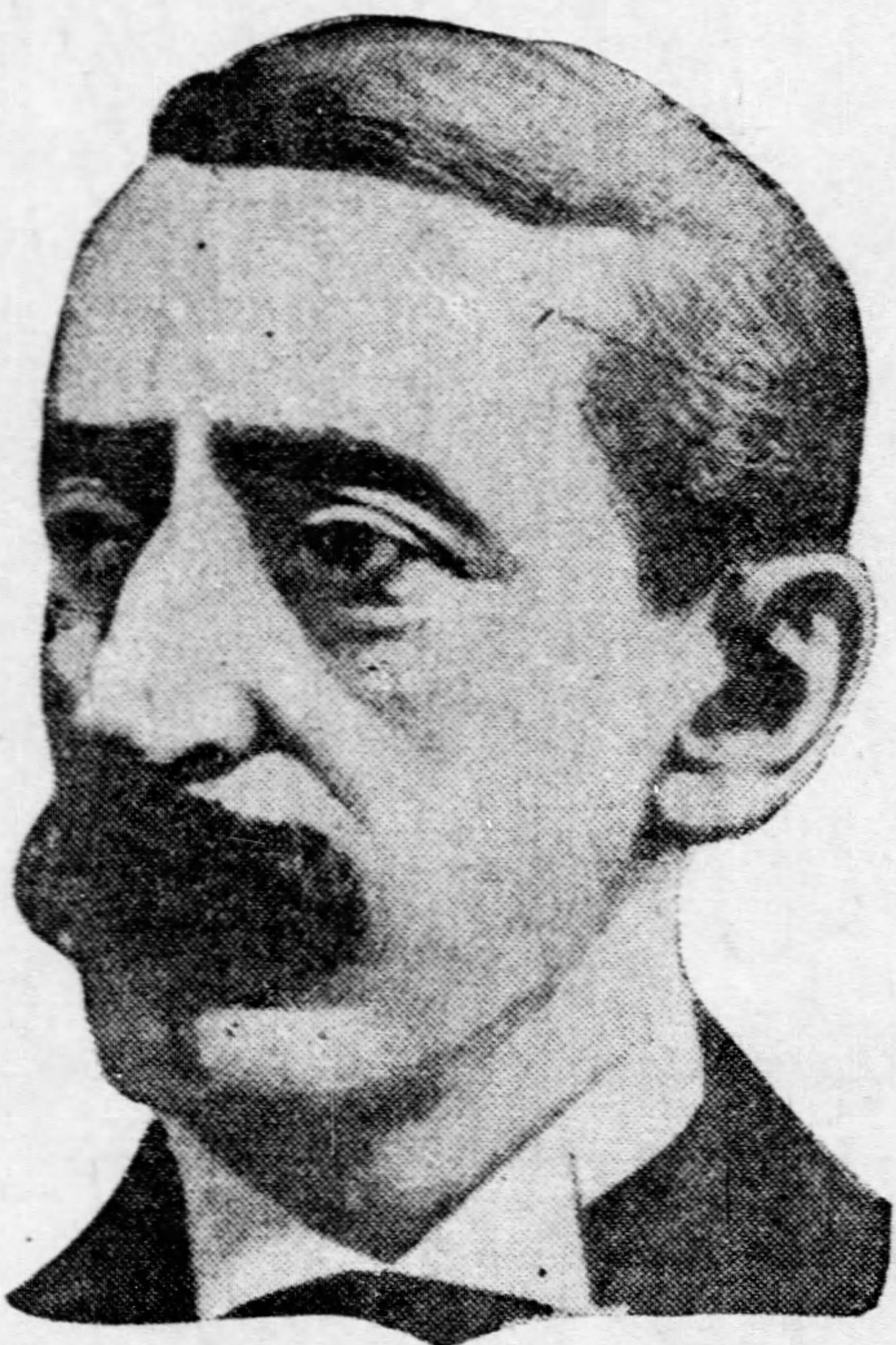

Judge of the United States District Court for the Western District of Pennsylvania
- In office September 25, 1906 – January 31, 1908
- Appointed by: Theodore Roosevelt
- Preceded by: Joseph Buffington
- Succeeded by: James Scott Young

Personal details
- Born: Nathaniel Ewing; June 17, 1848 Uniontown, Pennsylvania
- Died: March 28, 1914 (aged 65)
- Education: Princeton University (A.B., A.M.)

Nathaniel Ewing (June 17, 1848 – March 28, 1914) was a United States district judge of the United States District Court for the Western District of Pennsylvania.

== Education and career ==
Born in Uniontown, Pennsylvania, Ewing received an Artium Baccalaureus degree from Princeton University in 1869 and an Artium Magister degree from the same institution in 1872. He was in private practice in Uniontown from 1871 to 1887. He was a Judge of the 14th Judicial District of Pennsylvania from 1887 to 1899, returning to private practice in Uniontown from 1900 to 1906.

== Federal judicial service ==
Ewing received a recess appointment from President Theodore Roosevelt on September 25, 1906, to a seat on the United States District Court for the Western District of Pennsylvania vacated by Judge Joseph Buffington. He was nominated to the same position by President Roosevelt on December 3, 1906. He was confirmed by the United States Senate on December 11, 1906, and received his commission the same day. His service terminated on January 31, 1908, due to his resignation.

== Later career and death ==
Ewing was then Chairman of the Pennsylvania State Railroad Commission from 1908 to 1913, and Chairman of the Public Service Commission of Pennsylvania from 1913 to 1914. He died on March 28, 1914.

== Sources ==
Legal offices
Preceded by Joseph Buffington	Judge of the United States District Court for the Western District of Pennsylvania; 1906–1908	Succeeded by James Scott Young
