= D. Brooks Smith =

American judge (born 1951)

Brooks Smith
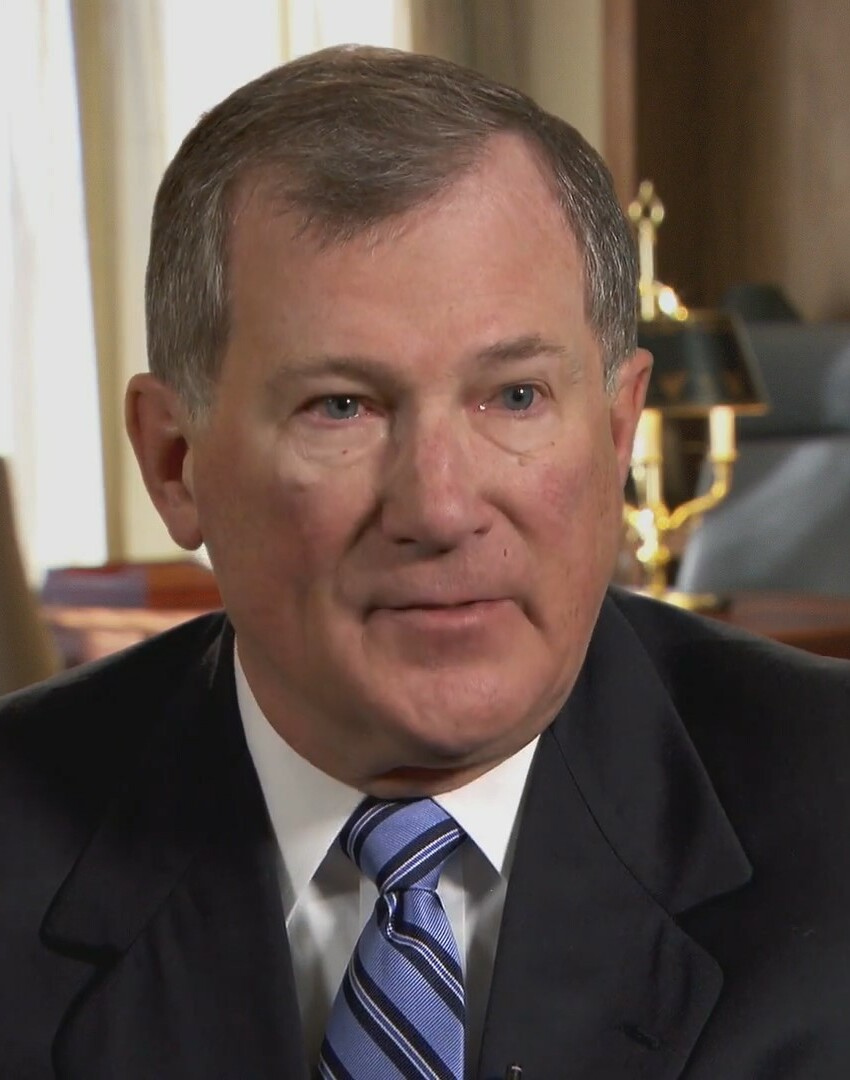
- Smith in 2017

Senior Judge of the United States Court of Appeals for the Third Circuit
- Incumbent
- Assumed office December 4, 2021

Chief Judge of the United States Court of Appeals for the Third Circuit
- In office October 1, 2016 – December 4, 2021
- Preceded by: Theodore McKee
- Succeeded by: Michael Chagares

Judge of the United States Court of Appeals for the Third Circuit
- In office August 2, 2002 – December 4, 2021
- Appointed by: George W. Bush
- Preceded by: Timothy K. Lewis
- Succeeded by: Cindy K. Chung

Chief Judge of the United States District Court for the Western District of Pennsylvania
- In office October 1, 2001 – September 23, 2002
- Preceded by: Donald Emil Ziegler
- Succeeded by: Donetta Ambrose

Judge of the United States District Court for the Western District of Pennsylvania
- In office October 17, 1988 – September 23, 2002
- Appointed by: Ronald Reagan
- Preceded by: Carol Los Mansmann
- Succeeded by: Kim R. Gibson

Personal details
- Born: David Brookman Smith; December 4, 1951 (age 74) Altoona, Pennsylvania, U.S.
- Education: Franklin and Marshall College (BA); Pennsylvania State University (JD)

David Brookman "Brooks" Smith (born 1951) is a senior judge of the United States Court of Appeals for the Third Circuit. He was previously chief judge of both the Third Circuit and the United States District Court for the Western District of Pennsylvania, and is the only judge in the history of the Third Circuit to have served as both a chief district judge and chief of the court of appeals.

== Career ==
Smith was born in Altoona, Pennsylvania. After graduating from Dickinson School of Law, Smith began his legal career in Altoona, eventually becoming managing partner of Jubelirer, Carothers, Krier, Halpern and Smith. From 1977 to 1979, Smith served as an Assistant District Attorney for Blair County, Pennsylvania. Smith was later named as a special prosecutor, conducting a grand jury investigation from 1981 to 1983 into organized criminal activity in central Pennsylvania. He became Blair County's District Attorney in 1983, and in December 1984, Pennsylvania Governor Dick Thornburgh appointed Smith to a judgeship on the Court of Common Pleas of Blair County. The following year, Smith received the nominations of both the Republican and Democratic Parties for a ten-year term as judge on the same court. In 1987, Chief Justice of the Pennsylvania Supreme Court Robert N. C. Nix Jr. appointed Smith as administrative judge of the Blair County Courts, charging him with responsibility to address that court's chronic backlog.

== Federal judicial service ==
=== District court service ===
In 1988, President Ronald Reagan, with the advice of Senators Arlen Specter and H. John Heinz III, nominated Smith to the United States District Court for the Western District of Pennsylvania. He was confirmed by the Senate on October 14, 1988, and received his commission on October 17, 1988. He served as Chief Judge of that court from 2001 to 2002. His service as a district court judge ended on September 23, 2002 when he was elevated to the court of appeals.

=== Court of appeals service ===
Smith was nominated to the United States Court of Appeals for the Third Circuit by President George W. Bush on September 10, 2001. Having been unanimously rated "well qualified" by the Standing Committee of the American Bar Association, his nomination was confirmed by the U.S. Senate on July 31, 2002. He received his commission on August 2, 2002. He served as chief judge of the Third Circuit from October 1, 2016 to December 4, 2021. Smith assumed senior status on December 4, 2021.

In June 2024, the Supreme Court of the United States appointed Smith as Special Master to oversee a matter filed pursuant to that Court's original jurisdiction under Article III, Section 2 of the Constitution. The case is Texas v. New Mexico and Colorado, No. 141.

== Professional affiliations and activities ==
During his years on the federal bench, Judge Smith has served, by appointment of the Chief Justice of the United States, on five committees of the Judicial Conference of the United States, the federal judiciary's policy-making body. During his term as chief judge of the Third Circuit, he sat on the conference's eight-member executive committee. In 2013, Chief Justice John Roberts appointed Judge Smith to chair the Committee on Space and Facilities. In that capacity, he led a national space reduction initiative which was the federal judiciary's major cost containment measure. Smith was a member of the Space and Facilities Committee from 2006 until 2016. During his time on the District Court, he served for six years on the Criminal Rules Advisory Committee of the Judicial Conference, beginning in 1993. And in early 2020, Smith became one of four federal judges who were members of the Federal Judiciary's COVID-19 Task Force.

After taking senior status in December 2021, Judge Smith was appointed to membership on both the Committee on Judicial Conduct and Disability and the Committee on Rules of Practice and Procedure.

He maintains membership in the American Law Institute, the Federal Judges Association and the Allegheny Bar Association.

=== International rule-of-law efforts ===
Judge Smith has assisted in efforts to enhance the rule of law in the judicial systems of Central and Eastern Europe. He has taught in judicial training sessions in Russia for the Department of State and with the American Bar Association’s Central and Eastern European Legal Initiative; in Bulgaria, Latvia and Albania with the United States Agency for International Development (USAID); in Kosovo with the International Development Law Organization; and in Bosnia and Macedonia with the U.S. Justice Department’s Office of Overseas Prosecutorial Development, Assistance and Training. In 2007, he assisted USAID with an assessment of the legal system in the Republic of the Philippines as part of that Agency’s Commercial Law and Institutional Reform initiative; participated in seven judicial ethics trainings for the USAID Judicial Development Project in Chisinau, Moldova; and addressed an International Conference “On the Impact of the European Convention on Human Rights to the Development of the Azerbaijani Legal System,” in Baku, Azerbaijan. In October 2008, Judge Smith returned to Moldova to speak on “The New Judicial Ethics Code: Interpretation and Application.” In 2014, as part of a USAID project in Serbia, Judge Smith delivered two training sessions for over 100 judges and judicial assistants of the Belgrade Misdemeanor Court and the Appellate Misdemeanor Court on the role of judges in a modern, independent judiciary.

Judge Smith’s rule-of-law seminars and lectures in several former Soviet republics led him to conclude both that the public perception of corruption there “probably outruns the reality” but also that corruption is a serious problem. For example, high-ranking judges in one such republic invited Judge Smith into their private offices where he observed the signs of “telephone justice,” in which a powerful politician calls a judge with instructions on how to dispose of a particular case. As Judge Smith put it, “[n]o judge needs three or more telephones in his private office.” The independence and public reputation of judges in developing countries also suffer, he has observed, from many judges’ practice of “speak[ing] to the media, perhaps even commenting on how a prosecutor is handling a particular case,” and from the fact that—in war-torn regions like Kosovo—autocrats may remove sitting judges and replace them with favored officials as patronage.

== Noteworthy rulings ==
- Smith held in Washington v. Klem, 497 F.3d 272 (3d Cir. 2007), that under the Religious Land Use and Institutionalized Persons Act (RLUIPA), a Pennsylvania Department of Corrections policy allowing only 10 books in a prisoner’s cell—but permitting additional magazines and newspapers, four large storage boxes of personal property, and more than 10 books if approved for educational purposes—substantially burdened an inmate’s right to freely exercise his religion. Smith wrote that a less restrictive alternative would have been to allow prisoners to choose what property could be kept in their permitted storage units.
- Petruska v. Gannon Univ., 462 F.3d 294 (3d Cir. 2006), cert. denied, 550 U.S. 903 (2007): Smith adopted the “ministerial exception,” which “operates to bar any claim, the resolution of which would limit a religious institution’s right to select who will perform particular spiritual functions,” to preclude a former chaplain’s Title VII and related claims against the private Catholic college that had employed her. The Supreme Court cited Smith’s opinion with approval in Hosanna-Tabor Evangelical Lutheran Church and School v. Equal Employment Opportunity Commission, 565 U.S. 171, 188 n.2, 194–95 n.4 (2012).
- United States v. Green, 617 F.3d 233 (3d Cir.), cert. denied, 562 U.S. 942 (2010): Smith was confronted with whether a defendant’s conviction for a drug trafficking offense should be vacated based on trial testimony that the defendant had tried to purchase dynamite and threatened to use it to murder an undercover police officer. After surveying the history of the “intrinsic exception” to the rule governing admission of other bad acts evidence, Smith held that the challenged testimony was not intrinsic because it did not directly prove the charged offense. But it was admissible as evidence of uncharged bad acts because, for example, it explained the testifying witness’s motive to cooperate with the Government (fear for officers’ safety).
- United States v. Tomko, 562 F.3d 558 (3d Cir. 2009) (en banc), involved an appeal of a defendant’s non-custodial sentence and statutory maximum $250,000 fine for income tax invasion. Smith held for the en banc court that the abuse-of-discretion standard applies to appellate review of a district court’s sentence. A court of appeals, Smith wrote, cannot presume that a sentence is unreasonable just because it falls outside the advisory sentencing guidelines range: “if the district court's sentence is procedurally sound, we will affirm it unless no reasonable sentencing court would have imposed the same sentence on that particular defendant for the reasons the district court provided.”
- In J.S. ex rel. Snyder v. Blue Mountain School Dist., 650 F.3d 915 (3d Cir. 2011) (en banc) (Smith, J., concurring), cert. denied, 565 U.S. 1156 (2012), Smith concurred with the majority’s conclusion that a public school district violated a student’s First Amendment rights by suspending her for creating—from her home computer on a Sunday evening—an internet profile containing her school principal’s photograph and profanity-laced statements insinuating that he was a sex addict and pedophile. But Smith would have held that Tinker v. Des Moines Independent Community School District, 393 U.S. 503 (1969), under which school officials may justify a restriction on expression only by showing that the forbidden conduct would materially and substantially disrupt the school’s necessary discipline, does not apply to off-campus speech in the first place.
- Writing for the en banc majority in B.H. ex rel. Hawk v. Easton Area School District, 725 F.3d 293 (3d Cir. 2013) (en banc), cert. denied, 572 U.S. 1002 (2014), Smith held that a school district’s ban on breast-cancer awareness bracelets violated students’ First Amendment rights because the bracelets could plausibly be commenting on political or social issues. The school district’s ban could not be justified under Bethel School District v. Fraser, 478 U.S. 675 (1986), because the bracelets were not lewd, profane, or offensive. Nor would permitting students to wear them substantially disrupt the school environment, as required under Tinker to justify restrictions on such expression.
- NLRB v. New Vista Nursing and Rehabilitation, 719 F.3d 203, 218–44 (3d Cir. 2013), abrogated by NLRB v. Noel Canning, 573 U.S. 513 (2014): Smith held that the phrase “Recess of the Senate” in the Recess Appointments Clause “refers to only intersession breaks,” not long intrasession breaks or times where the Senate is not “open to conduct business.” Smith concluded that one NLRB member was invalidly appointed by the president during an intrasession break.
- In King v. Governor of State of New Jersey, 767 F.3d 216 (3d Cir. 2014), abrogated by National Institute of Family and Life Advocates v. Becerra, 138 S. Ct. 2361 (2018), Smith held that New Jersey’s prohibition on counselors engaging in sexual orientation change therapy did not violate the counselors’ First Amendment free speech or religious free exercise rights. Smith recognized “professional speech” as a separate category of speech, the content-based regulation of which is not subject to heightened First Amendment strict scrutiny. Four years later, in a fractured ruling with four Justices dissenting, the Supreme Court held that professional speech of those performing personalized services under a state license is not exempt from the rule that content-based regulations of speech are subject to strict scrutiny.
- In re National Football League Players Concussion Injury Litig., 775 F.3d 570 (3d Cir. 2014): Smith held, as a matter of first impression, that only orders granting or denying class-action certification pursuant to Rule 23(c)(1) are subject to appellate jurisdiction under Rule 23(f). Smith concluded that the district court’s order preliminarily approving class certification only for settlement purposes was thus unreviewable on interlocutory appeal.
- In the immigration context, Smith has held that 8 U.S.C. § 1252(e) forecloses subject-matter jurisdiction over habeas challenges to the adequacy of credible fear proceedings conducted pursuant to expedited removal orders. Castro v. U.S. Dep’t of Homeland Sec., 835 F.3d 422 (3d Cir. 2016), cert. denied, 137 S. Ct. 1581 (2017). In Castro, Smith also held that application of § 1252(e) to petitioners apprehended near the border shortly after illegal entry does not violate the Suspension Clause of the U.S. Constitution because such aliens were effectively seeking initial admission to the U.S. and thus had no constitutional rights regarding their applications for admission. In Department of Homeland Security v. Thuraissigiam, 140 S. Ct. 1959 (2020), the Supreme Court agreed with the Castro decision in resolving a Circuit split over whether application of § 1252(e) violates the Suspension Clause.
- Confronted with a suit arising out of a mentally ill prisoner’s suicide after repeated stints in solitary confinement, Smith concluded that the parents could sue prison officials and health care providers for Eighth Amendment violations. Smith held that the parents stated claims for deliberate indifference to both the inhumane confinement conditions and the decedent’s serious medical need for mental health care, for failure to train, and for failure to prevent suicide. Palakovic v. Wetzel, 854 F.3d 209 (3d Cir. 2017).
- Presiding over a three-judge panel of the District Court under 28 U.S.C. § 2284, Smith held that Pennsylvania residents were not entitled to a declaratory judgment that a redistricting plan violated the Elections Clause of the U.S. Constitution by favoring candidates from one political party. Agre v. Wolf, 284 F. Supp. 3d 591 (E.D. Pa. 2018), appeal dismissed as moot, 138 S. Ct. 2756 (2018). Smith concluded that such claims are non-justiciable under Article III. In 2019, the Supreme Court in a 5–4 decision held that partisan gerrymandering claims present non-justiciable political questions beyond the reach of federal courts. Rucho v. Common Cause, 139 S. Ct. 2484 (2019).
- Ragbir v. United States, 950 F.3d 54 (3d Cir. 2020): Smith examined the historical roots and modern scope of the writ of error coram nobis, concluding that petitioner failed to meet the requirements for issuance of the writ.
- United States v. Raia, 954 F.3d 594 (3d Cir.), as revised (Apr. 8, 2020): Smith noted that motions for compassionate release under the First Step Act are subject to the exhaustion requirements of 18 U.S.C. § 3582(c)(1) and held that a motion by a defendant who did not give the Bureau of Prisons 30 days to respond to his request was futile. Smith concluded that “strict compliance with 3582(c)(1)(A)’s exhaustion requirement takes on added—and critical—importance” during the COVID-19 pandemic.

=== Review by Supreme Court ===
- United States v. Stevens, 533 F.3d 218 (3d Cir. 2008) (en banc), affirmed, 559 U.S. 460 (2010): Smith declined to recognize depictions of animal cruelty as a category of speech unprotected by the First Amendment. Smith held that the then-current 18 U.S.C. § 48, which made it illegal to create, sell, or possess depictions of animal cruelty, was unconstitutional because the government lacked a compelling interest in preventing depictions of animal cruelty without regulating the underlying acts of animal cruelty.
- Bruesewitz v. Wyeth, Inc., 561 F.3d 233 (3d Cir. 2009), affirmed, 562 U.S. 223 (2011): Smith held that plaintiffs’ state tort law claims of strict liability and negligent design for a vaccine administered to their daughter were preempted by the National Childhood Vaccine Injury Act.
- Greene v. Palakovich, 606 F.3d 85 (3d Cir. 2010), aff'd sub nom. Greene v. Fisher, 565 U.S. 34 (2011): Smith held that the phrase "clearly established Federal law," part of the standard of review for habeas corpus petitions since the Antiterrorism and Effective Death Penalty Act of 1996, refers to Supreme Court decisions which existed at the time of the relevant state-court decision.
- Manning v. Merrill Lynch Pierce Fenner & Smith, Inc., 772 F.3d 158 (3d Cir. 2014), affirmed, 136 S. Ct. 1562 (2016): Smith held that the exclusive jurisdiction provision, § 27, of the Exchange Act is coextensive with 28 U.S.C. § 1331, the general federal-question statute.
- Knick v. Twp. of Scott, 862 F.3d 310, 327 (3d Cir. 2017), reversed, 139 S. Ct. 2162, 2178 (2019): Smith acknowledged that the Township's ordinance was "constitutionally suspect," but declined to overlook the state litigation requirement of Williamson County's prudential doctrine. The Supreme Court reversed and overruled the state litigation requirement of its Williamson County precedent, noting that the continuing evolution of the justification for this prudential doctrine “is another factor undermining the force of ‘stare decisis.’”
- In Bognet v. Secretary of the Commonwealth of Pennsylvania, 980 F.3d 336 (3d Cir. 2020), voters and a congressional candidate on the eve of the 2020 election sought to enjoin the counting of mail-in ballots received during a three-day extension of the Commonwealth’s ballot-receipt deadline that was ordered by the Pennsylvania Supreme Court. Smith held that both sets of plaintiffs lacked standing to sue for the alleged violations of the Elections Clause, Electors Clause, and the Due Process Clause of the Fourteenth Amendment. Separately, Smith wrote, awarding an injunction would have been improvident under the Supreme Court’s decision in Purcell v. Gonzalez, 549 U.S. 1 (2006) (per curiam), which counsels federal courts against altering election rules immediately before an election. In April 2021, after the election results were certified, the Supreme Court granted the plaintiffs' petition for certiorari in order to vacate the Third Circuit's decision with instruction to dismiss the case as moot under the Munsingwear doctrine. 593 U.S. __ (2021).

== Academic ==
From 2008 to 2022, Smith was an adjunct professor at Penn State Law, teaching class actions and complex litigation. In addition, he has been a speaker or a faculty member in academic programs offered by foreign law schools. He also served as a trustee for more than a decade at Saint Francis University and then for a five-year period at Mount Aloysius College.

== Awards ==
Members of the public who enter the Weis Federal Courthouse in downtown Pittsburgh pass through the “Judge D. Brooks Smith Lobby.” A special session of Court which was attended by judges of the Third Circuit and the Western District of Pennsylvania was held in Pittsburgh on April 21, 2022, to officially name the lobby.

Judge Smith delivered commencement addresses at, and had conferred on him honorary Doctor of Human Letters degrees by: Mount Aloysius College in 2012, Waynesburg University in 2022; and St. Francis University in 2025.

Pennsylvanians for Modern Courts presented Judge Smith with its Judge Justin Johnson Award in 2023. That award bears the name of a distinguished Pittsburgh legal practitioner who, in 1980 became only the second African American to be appointed to Pennsylvania’s Superior Court.

Smith has been named an Alumni Fellow by the Penn State Alumni Association, and in 2017 was given the Distinguished Alumni Award, the highest honor bestowed by Penn State on an alumnus. Penn State Law presented Judge Smith its first ever Leadership Award in 2016. And in 1996, the Blair and Bedford County Central Labor Council named Smith its person of the year.

For his work as one of a two-prosecutor team investigating organized crime in Central Pennsylvania in the early 1980s, Smith received a commendation from the Commissioner of the Pennsylvania State Police which called him the investigation's "legal shepherd."

Legal offices
Preceded by Carol Los Mansmann	Judge of the United States District Court for the Western District of Pennsylvania; 1988–2002	Succeeded by Kim R. Gibson
Preceded by Donald Emil Ziegler	Chief Judge of the United States District Court for the Western District of Pennsylvania; 2001–2002	Succeeded by Donetta Ambrose
Preceded by Timothy K. Lewis	Judge of the United States Court of Appeals for the Third Circuit; 2002–2021	Succeeded by Cindy K. Chung
Preceded by Theodore McKee	Chief Judge of the United States Court of Appeals for the Third Circuit; 2016–2021	Succeeded by Michael Chagares
