= Timothy K. Lewis =

American judge (born 1954)

Timothy Lewis

Judge of the United States Court of Appeals for the Third Circuit
- In office October 9, 1992 – June 30, 1999
- Appointed by: George H. W. Bush
- Preceded by: Seat established
- Succeeded by: D. Brooks Smith

Judge of the United States District Court for the Western District of Pennsylvania
- In office June 18, 1991 – October 23, 1992
- Appointed by: George H. W. Bush
- Preceded by: Paul Allen Simmons
- Succeeded by: Gary L. Lancaster

Personal details
- Born: Timothy Kimbrue Lewis; 1954 (age 71–72) Pittsburgh, Pennsylvania, U.S.
- Education: Tufts University (BA); Duquesne University (JD)

Timothy Kimbrue Lewis (born November 2, 1954) is a former United States circuit judge of the United States Court of Appeals for the Third Circuit. As of June 2024, he is an attorney at the law firm of Blank Rome LLP, where he serves as a mediator, arbitrator, settlement counselor, and trial and appellate practitioner. Lewis is African American.

== Education and career ==
Lewis was born in Pittsburgh on November 2, 1954. He graduated from Tufts University with a Bachelor of Arts degree in 1976 and from Duquesne University School of Law with a Juris Doctor in 1980. He worked as an assistant district attorney for Allegheny County, Pennsylvania from 1980 to 1983, and as an Assistant United States Attorney for the Western District of Pennsylvania from 1983 to 1991. He is the great-great-great-grandson of Lewis Woodson, believed to be the grandson of Thomas Jefferson and his alleged mixed-race slave, Sally Hemings, with DNA evidence in 1998 suggesting this was true.

=== Federal judicial service ===
Lewis' judicial career began on April 25, 1991, when President George H. W. Bush nominated him to the bench of the United States District Court for the Western District of Pennsylvania, to fill the vacancy left by Paul A. Simmons. He was confirmed by the Senate on June 14, 1991, and received his commission on June 18, 1991. His service terminated on October 23, 1992, due to elevation to the court of appeals.

President Bush chose to elevate Lewis again when he nominated him for a newly created seat on the United States Court of Appeals for the Third Circuit on September 17, 1992. He was confirmed to this seat by the Senate on October 8, 1992. He received his commission on October 9, 1992, making him the final George H. W. Bush appeals-court nominee confirmed by the Senate. At the time of both appointments, he was the youngest federal judge in the United States. On June 30, 1999, Lewis resigned his seat to return to private practice.

=== Later career ===
Lewis is currently a senior counsel in the Business Litigation practice group at Blank Rome LLP where he serves as a mediator, arbitrator, settlement counselor, and trial and appellate practitioner.

After resigning from the bench, Lewis worked at Schnader, Harrison, Segal & Lewis LLP, where he served as co-chair of the firm's alternative dispute resolution group and often served as a mediator, arbitrator, and settlement counselor. Lewis also served as counsel on trial and appellate matters and is a past co-chair of Schnader's appellate practice group.

Lewis has formerly held several positions with the American Arbitration Association, including as a member of the Judicial Settlement Conference Service Panel, a member of the National Task Force on Issues Related to the Arbitration of Consumer Debt Issues, and as a board and executive committee member. At the International Institute for Conflict Prevention and Resolution (CPR), he served on the Task Force that created the Employment-Related Mass Claims Protocol for arbitrators and mediators, is co-chair of the Diversity in ADR Task Force, and is a former member of the board of directors. Lewis is a member of the American Law Institute, an honorary fellow of the American Academy of Appellate Lawyers, a fellow of the College of Commercial Arbitrators, an active member of the Pennsylvania Interbranch Commission for Gender, Racial, and Ethnic Fairness, and serves on the Board of Advisors of the Georgetown Supreme Court Institute. He is a former member of the board of directors of the National Jazz Museum in Harlem.

== See also ==
- List of African-American federal judges
- List of African-American jurists

Legal offices
| Preceded by Paul Allen Simmons | Judge of the United States District Court for the Western District of Pennsylvania; 1991–1992 | Succeeded by Gary L. Lancaster |
| New seat | Judge of the United States Court of Appeals for the Third Circuit; 1992–1999 | Succeeded by D. Brooks Smith |
