= Arthur J. Schwab =

American judge (born 1946)

Arthur James Schwab
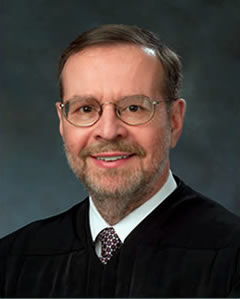

Senior Judge of the United States District Court for the Western District of Pennsylvania
- Incumbent
- Assumed office January 1, 2018

Judge of the United States District Court for the Western District of Pennsylvania
- In office September 17, 2002 – January 1, 2018
- Appointed by: George W. Bush
- Preceded by: Maurice Blanchard Cohill Jr.
- Succeeded by: Robert J. Colville

Personal details
- Born: Arthur James Schwab; 1946 (age 79–80) Pittsburgh, Pennsylvania
- Education: Grove City College (AB); University of Virginia (JD)

Arthur James Schwab (born 1946) is a senior United States district judge of the United States District Court for the Western District of Pennsylvania.

== Early life, education, and career ==
Born in Pittsburgh, Pennsylvania, Schwab received an Artium Baccalaureus from Grove City College, Pennsylvania in 1968 and a Juris Doctor from the University of Virginia School of Law in 1972. He served in the Pennsylvania National Guard from 1968 to 1978, and was a law clerk in a Pennsylvania private practice in 1972, and to Chief Judge Collins J. Seitz of the United States Court of Appeals for the Third Circuit from 1972 to 1973.

He was in private practice in Pennsylvania from 1973 to 2002. He began teaching as an adjunct professor at Grove City College, Pennsylvania, in 2001.

== Federal judicial service ==
On January 23, 2002, Schwab was nominated by President George W. Bush to a seat on the United States District Court for the Western District of Pennsylvania vacated by Maurice B. Cohill, Jr. Schwab was confirmed by the United States Senate on September 13, 2002; received commission on September 17, 2002; and sworn-in to office on January 1, 2003. He assumed senior status on January 1, 2018.

In 2008, the Pittsburgh Post-Gazette reported Schwab had the "lowest ranking among federal judges" by 797 lawyers in the Allegheny County Bar Association.

In 2011, he was accused of bias and recused himself from seventeen ongoing cases.

=== Tommy Chong case ===
In 2003, Schwab presided over the case involving Tommy Chong's trial for conspiracy to distribute drug paraphernalia (bongs), and sentenced him to nine months in federal prison, as well as a hefty financial penalty.

=== Cyril Wecht case ===
In 2008, Schwab presided over and was eventually removed from the Cyril Wecht federal trial, a case that caused considerable controversy. The defendant, a prominent Democrat in Pennsylvania, alleged that Judge Schwab was biased and the prosecution was political in nature and sought unsuccessfully to have the judge removed. Among the decisions Judge Schwab made was seeking to keep the names of jurors anonymous, a tactic usually reserved for criminal cases where the jurors may be in danger. This was overturned by the Third Circuit Court of Appeals. After Schwab declared the original trial a mistrial, he was criticized for not following proper procedures before declaring a mistrial, such as polling the jury which would have determined if the defendant should be retried on all counts or just one. One month later, he was removed from presiding over the retrial. The Appellate court cited a "combative tenor" in the proceedings and hoped for "reduced level of rancor." On May 14, 2009, the new judge in the case tossed out most of the evidence against Wecht stating it was seized under unconstitutional warrants On June 2, all charges were dropped against Wecht.

=== West Penn Allegheny Health System v UPMC case ===
In 2012, Schwab presided over the West Penn Allegheny Health System v University of Pittsburgh Medical Center (UPMC) case, and in a rare move, the 3rd U.S. Circuit Court of Appeals removed him from case. According to Pittsburgh Post Gazette, "It's rare for a federal judge to get yanked from a case, and twice in four years gets everyone's attention."

=== Juarez-Escobar Case ===
On December 16, 2014, Schwab wrote that President Obama's executive action on immigration was unconstitutional in a case involving a Honduran man facing criminal charges for returning to the United States after being deported. Whether discussion of the presidential order was necessary or appropriate to resolve the case before the court was questioned in the Washington Post.

Legal offices
| Preceded by Maurice Blanchard Cohill Jr. | Judge of the United States District Court for the Western District of Pennsylvania; 2002–2018 | Succeeded by Robert J. Colville |
