= United States District Court for the Western District of Pennsylvania =

United States federal district court in Pennsylvania

- (W.D. Pa.)
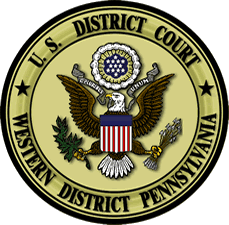

- Western District in green
- Location: Joseph F. Weis, Jr. U.S. Courthouse (Pittsburgh) More locations: Erie Federal Courthouse (Erie); Johnstown
- Appeals to: Third Circuit
- Established: April 20, 1818
- Judges: 10
- Chief Judge: Cathy Bissoon

Officers of the court
- U.S. Attorney: Troy Rivetti
- U.S. Marshal: Michael Baughman
- PaWD.uscourts.gov

The United States District Court for the Western District of Pennsylvania (in case citations, W.D. Pa.) is a federal trial court that sits in Pittsburgh, Erie, and Johnstown, Pennsylvania. It is composed of ten judges as authorized by federal law. Appeals from this court are heard by the United States Court of Appeals for the Third Circuit (except for patent claims and claims against the U.S. government under the Tucker Act, which are appealed to the Federal Circuit).

== History ==
The United States District Court for the District of Pennsylvania was one of the original 13 courts established by the Judiciary Act of 1789, 1 Stat. 73, on September 24, 1789. It was subdivided on April 20, 1818, by 3 Stat. 462, into the Eastern and Western Districts to be headquartered in Philadelphia and Pittsburgh, respectively. The court began its first session on December 7, 1818 at the Old County Courthouse in Pittsburgh. Portions of these districts were subsequently subdivided into the Middle District on March 2, 1901, by 31 Stat. 880. At the time of its initial subdivision, presiding judge Richard Peters Jr. was reassigned to only the Eastern District. This made it possible for President James Monroe to appoint Jonathan Hoge Walker as the first judge of the Western District of Pennsylvania.

The Erie courthouse and division was split from Pittsburgh for initial actions in January 1867, with the Johnstown courthouse and division being split from Pittsburgh for initial actions in 1989.

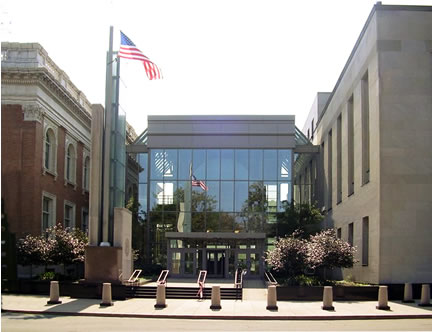
Federal Courthouse, Erie, Pennsylvania

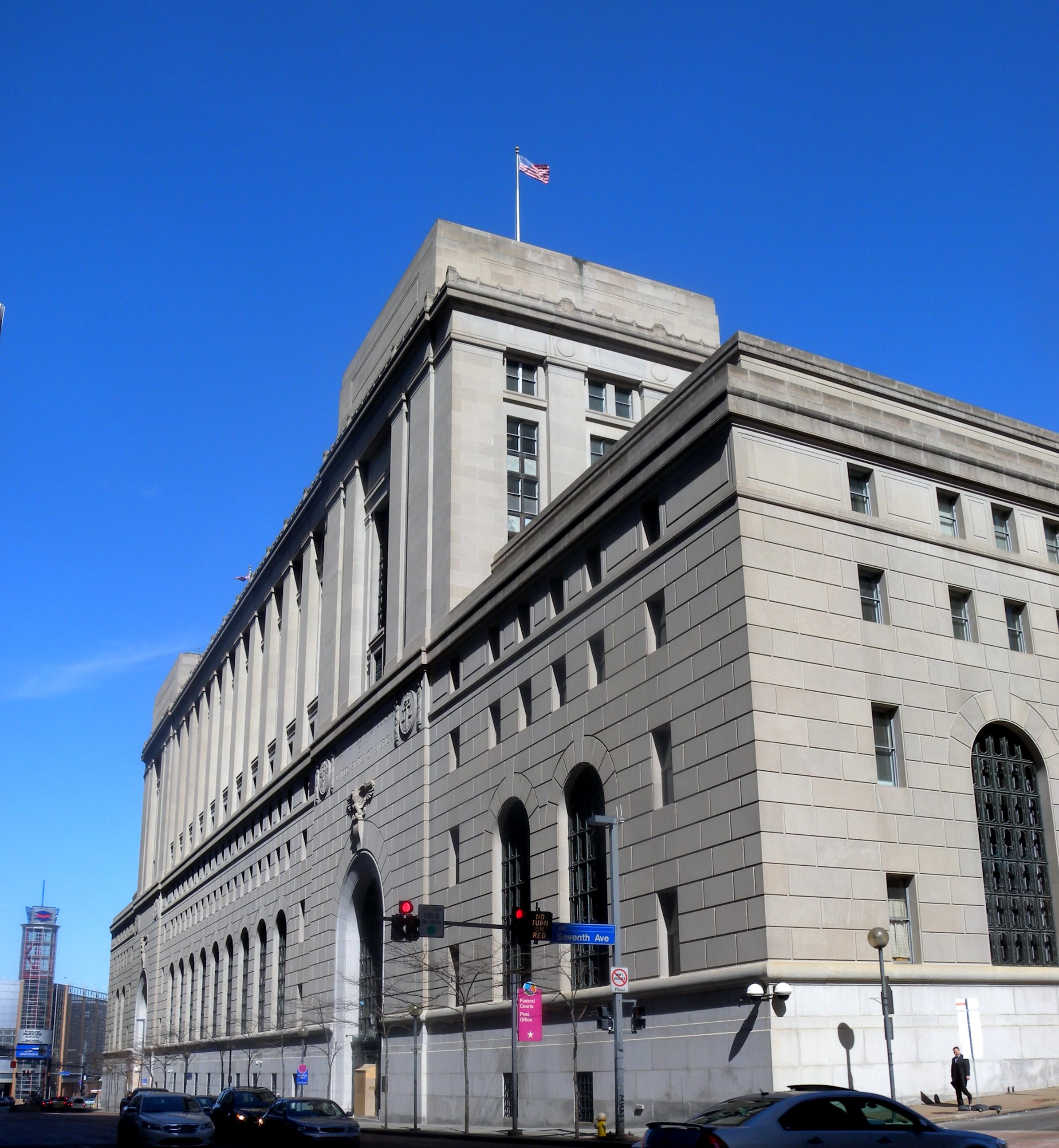
Federal Courthouse, Pittsburgh

== Current judges ==
As of December 7, 2025:

#	Title	Judge	Duty station	Born	Term of service			Appointed by
#	Title	Judge	Duty station	Born	Active	Chief	Senior	Appointed by
57	Chief Judge	Cathy Bissoon	Pittsburgh	1968	2011–present	2025–present	—	Obama
56	District Judge	Mark R. Hornak	Pittsburgh	1956	2011–present	2018–2025	—	Obama
58	District Judge	Susan Paradise Baxter	Erie	1956	2018–present	—	—	Trump
59	District Judge	Marilyn Horan	Pittsburgh	1954	2018–present	—	—	Trump
61	District Judge	Nicholas Ranjan	Pittsburgh	1978	2019–present	—	—	Trump
62	District Judge	William S. Stickman IV	Pittsburgh	1979	2019–present	—	—	Trump
63	District Judge	Stephanie L. Haines	Johnstown	1969	2019–present	—	—	Trump
64	District Judge	Robert J. Colville	Pittsburgh	1965	2019–present	—	—	Trump
65	District Judge	W. Scott Hardy	Pittsburgh	1971	2020–present	—	—	Trump
66	District Judge	Christy C. Wiegand	Pittsburgh	1975	2020–present	—	—	Trump
45	Senior Judge	Donetta Ambrose	inactive	1945	1993–2010	2002–2009	2010–present	Clinton
49	Senior Judge	Joy Flowers Conti	Pittsburgh	1948	2002–2018	2013–2018	2018–present	G.W. Bush
50	Senior Judge	David S. Cercone	Pittsburgh; Erie	1952	2002–2017	—	2017–present	G.W. Bush
52	Senior Judge	Arthur J. Schwab	Pittsburgh	1946	2002–2018	—	2018–present	G.W. Bush
55	Senior Judge	Nora Barry Fischer	Pittsburgh	1951	2007–2019	—	2019–present	G.W. Bush

== Former judges ==
#	Judge	Born–died	Active service	Chief Judge	Senior status	Appointed by	Reason for termination
1	Jonathan Hoge Walker	1754–1824	1818–1824	—	—	Monroe	death
2	William Wilkins	1779–1865	1824–1831	—	—	Monroe	resignation
3	Thomas Irwin	1785–1870	1831–1859 (Note: Recess appointment; formally nominated on December 7, 1831, confirmed by the United States Senate on March 21, 1832, and received commission the same day.)	—	—	Jackson	resignation
4	Wilson McCandless	1810–1882	1859–1876	—	—	Buchanan	retirement
5	Winthrop Welles Ketcham	1820–1879	1876–1879	—	—	Grant	death
6	Marcus Wilson Acheson	1828–1906	1880–1891	—	—	Hayes	elevation
7	James Hay Reed	1853–1927	1891–1892	—	—	B. Harrison	resignation
8	Joseph Buffington	1855–1947	1892–1906	—	—	B. Harrison	elevation
9	Nathaniel Ewing	1848–1914	1906–1908 (Note: Recess appointment; formally nominated on December 3, 1906, confirmed by the Senate on December 11, 1906, and received commission the same day.)	—	—	T. Roosevelt	resignation
10	James Scott Young	1848–1914	1908–1914	—	—	T. Roosevelt	death
11	Charles Prentiss Orr	1858–1922	1909–1922	—	—	Taft	death
12	W. H. Seward Thomson	1856–1932	1914–1928	—	1928–1932	Wilson	death
13	Robert Murray Gibson	1869–1949	1922–1949	1948–1949	1949–1949	Harding	death
14	Frederic Palen Schoonmaker	1870–1945	1922–1945	—	—	Harding	death
15	Nelson McVicar	1871–1960	1928–1951 (Note: Recess appointment; formally nominated on December 6, 1928, confirmed by the Senate on December 17, 1928, and received commission the same day.)	1949–1951	1951–1960	Coolidge	death
16	Wallace Samuel Gourley	1904–1976	1945–1969	1951–1969	1969–1976	Truman	death
17	Frederick Voris Follmer	1885–1971	1946–1955 (Note: Jointly appointed to the Eastern, Middle, and Western Districts of Pennsylvania)	—	—	Truman	reassignment
18	Owen McIntosh Burns	1892–1952	1949–1952 (Note: Recess appointment; formally nominated on January 5, 1950, confirmed by the Senate on March 8, 1950, and received commission on March 9, 1950.)	—	—	Truman	death
19	Rabe Ferguson Marsh Jr.	1905–1993	1950–1977	1969–1975	1977–1993	Truman	death
20	William Alvah Stewart	1903–1953	1951–1953	—	—	Truman	death
21	Joseph Putnam Willson	1902–1998	1953–1968	—	1968–1998	Eisenhower	death
22	John Lester Miller	1901–1978	1954–1971	—	1971–1978	Eisenhower	death
23	John Wilson McIlvaine	1907–1963	1955–1963	—	—	Eisenhower	death
24	Herbert Peter Sorg	1911–1979	1955–1976	1975–1976	1976–1979	Eisenhower	death
25	Edward Dumbauld	1905–1997	1961–1976	—	1976–1997	Kennedy	death
26	Louis Rosenberg	1898–1999	1961–1976 (Note: Recess appointment; formally nominated on January 15, 1962, confirmed by the Senate on July 10, 1962, and received commission on July 12, 1962.)	—	1976–1999	Kennedy	death
27	Gerald Joseph Weber	1914–1989	1964–1988	1976–1982	1988–1989	L. Johnson	death
28	Joseph F. Weis Jr.	1923–2014	1970–1973	—	—	Nixon	elevation
29	William W. Knox	1911–1981	1970–1981	—	—	Nixon	death
30	Hubert Irving Teitelbaum	1915–1995	1970–1985	1982–1985	1985–1995	Nixon	death
31	Barron Patterson McCune	1915–2008	1970–1985	—	1985–2008	Nixon	death
32	Ralph Francis Scalera	1930–2011	1971–1976	—	—	Nixon	resignation
33	Daniel John Snyder Jr.	1916–1980	1973–1980	—	—	Nixon	death
34	Maurice Blanchard Cohill Jr.	1929–2022	1976–1994	1985–1992	1994–2022	Ford	death
35	Paul Allen Simmons	1921–2014	1978–1990	—	1990–2014	Carter	death
36	Gustave Diamond	1928–2021	1978–1994	1992–1994	1994–2021	Carter	death
37	Donald Emil Ziegler	1936–2019	1978–2001	1994–2001	2001–2003	Carter	retirement
38	Alan N. Bloch	1932–2024	1979–1997	—	1997–2024	Carter	death
39	Carol Los Mansmann	1942–2002	1982–1985	—	—	Reagan	elevation
40	Glenn Everell Mencer	1925–2007	1982–1994	—	1994–2007	Reagan	death
41	William Lloyd Standish	1930–2015	1987–2002	—	2002–2015	Reagan	death
42	D. Brooks Smith	1951–present	1988–2002	2001–2002	—	Reagan	elevation
43	Donald J. Lee	1927–2011	1990–2000	—	2000–2011	G.H.W. Bush	death
44	Timothy K. Lewis	1954–present	1991–1992	—	—	G.H.W. Bush	elevation
46	Gary L. Lancaster	1949–2013	1993–2013	2009–2013	—	Clinton	death
47	Robert J. Cindrich	1943–present	1994–2004	—	—	Clinton	resignation
48	Sean J. McLaughlin	1955–present	1994–2013	2013	—	Clinton	resignation
51	Terrence F. McVerry	1943–2021	2002–2013	—	2013–2021	G.W. Bush	death
53	Kim R. Gibson	1948–2025	2003–2016	—	2016–2025	G.W. Bush	death
54	Thomas Hardiman	1965–present	2003–2007	—	—	G.W. Bush	elevation
60	Peter J. Phipps	1973–present	2018–2019	—	—	Trump	elevation

== Chief judges ==
Chief judges have administrative responsibilities with respect to their district court. Unlike the Supreme Court, where one justice is specifically nominated to be chief, the office of chief judge rotates among the district court judges. To be chief, a judge must have been in active service on the court for at least one year, be under the age of 65, and have not previously served as chief judge.

A vacancy is filled by the judge highest in seniority among the group of qualified judges. The chief judge serves for a term of seven years, or until age 70, whichever occurs first. The age restrictions are waived if no members of the court would otherwise be qualified for the position.

When the office was created in 1948, the chief judge was the longest-serving judge who had not elected to retire, on what has since 1958 been known as senior status, or declined to serve as chief judge. After August 6, 1959, judges could not become or remain chief after turning 70 years old. The current rules have been in operation since October 1, 1982.

== Succession of seats ==
Seat 1
Seat established on April 20, 1818 by 3 Stat. 462
Walker	1818–1824
Wilkins	1824–1831
Irwin	1832–1859
McCandless	1859–1876
Ketcham	1876–1879
Acheson	1880–1891
Reed, Sr.	1891–1892
Buffington	1892–1906
Ewing	1906–1908
Young	1908–1914
Thomson	1914–1928
McVicar	1928–1951
Stewart	1951–1953
Miller	1954–1971
Scalera	1971–1976
Simmons	1978–1990
Lewis	1991–1992
Lancaster	1993–2013
Horan	2018–present

Seat 2
Seat established on February 26, 1909 by 35 Stat. 656
Orr	1909–1922
R. Gibson	1922–1949
Marsh Jr.	1950–1977
Ziegler	1978–2001
McVerry	2002–2013
Phipps	2018–2019
Wiegand	2020–present

Seat 3
Seat established on September 14, 1922 by 42 Stat. 837 (temporary)
Seat made permanent on August 19, 1935 by 49 Stat. 659
Schoonmaker	1922–1945
Gourley	1945–1969
Teitelbaum	1970–1985
Lee	1990–2000
Cercone	2002–2017
Haines	2019–present

Seat 4
Seat established on July 24, 1946 by 60 Stat. 654 (temporary, concurrent with Middle and Eastern Districts)
Seat made permanent on February 10, 1954 by 68 Stat. 8
Follmer	1946–1955
Seat statutorily assigned solely to the Middle District on June 1, 1955

Seat 5
Seat established on August 3, 1949 by 63 Stat. 493 (temporary)
Seat made permanent on August 29, 1950 by 64 Stat. 562
Burns	1950–1952
Willson	1953–1968
Weis Jr.	1970–1973
Snyder Jr.	1973–1980
Mencer	1982–1994
McLaughlin	1994–2013
Baxter	2018–present

Seat 6
Seat established on February 10, 1954 by 68 Stat. 8
McIlvaine	1955–1963
Weber	1964–1988
Ambrose	1993–2010
Hornak	2011–present

Seat 7
Seat established on February 10, 1954 by 68 Stat. 8 (temporary)
Seat made permanent on May 19, 1961 by 75 Stat. 80
Sorg	1955–1976
Bloch	1979–1997
Conti	2002–2018
Stickman IV	2019–present

Seat 8
Seat established on May 19, 1961 by 75 Stat. 80
Dumbauld	1961–1976
Diamond	1978–1994
Cindrich	1994–2004
Fischer	2007–2019
Hardy	2020–present

Seat 9
Seat established on May 19, 1961 by 75 Stat. 80
Rosenberg	1962–1976
Cohill Jr.	1976–1994
Schwab	2002–2018
Colville	2019–present

Seat 10
Seat established on June 2, 1970 by 84 Stat. 294
Knox	1970–1981
Mansmann	1982–1985
Smith	1988–2002
K. Gibson	2003–2016
Ranjan	2019–present

Seat 11
Seat established on June 2, 1970 by 84 Stat. 294
McCune	1970–1985
Standish IV	1987–2002
Hardiman	2003–2007
Bissoon	2011–present

== United States attorneys ==
United States attorneys for the district have included:

- James Hamilton March 11, 1801
- Andrew Stewart April 20, 1818
- Alexander Brackenridge March 3, 1821
- George W. Buchanan October 22, 1830
- Benjamin Patton Jr. October 22, 1832
- John P. Anderson June 12, 1839
- Cornelius Darragh March 25, 1841
- William O'Hara Robinson March 29, 1844
- John L. Dawson July 22, 1845
- J. Bowman Sweitzer August 27, 1850
- Charles Shaler April 19, 1853
- Richard Biddle Roberts April 21, 1857
- Robert B. Carnahan April 12, 1861
- Henry B. Swope January 24, 1870
- David Reed March 24, 1874
- Henry H. McCormick June 29, 1876
- William A. Stone July 6, 1880
- George A. Allen December 4, 1886
- Walter Lyon June 21, 1889
- Stephen C. McCandless April 26, 1893
- Harry Alvan Hall June 8, 1893
- Daniel B. Heiner September 14, 1897
- James S. Young February 10, 1902
- John W. Dunkle March 17, 1905
- John H. Jordan April 15, 1909
- Edwin Lowry Humes September 10, 1913
- R. Lindsay Crawford September 2, 1918
- Edwin Lowry Humes August 20, 1919
- Robert J. Dodds June 1, 1920
- D. J. Driscoll August 19, 1920
- Walter Lyon March 11, 1921
- John D. Meyer July 18, 1925
- Louis Edward Graham October 31, 1929
- Horatio S. Dumbauld August 17, 1933
- Charles F. Uhl May 12, 1941
- Owen McIntosh Burns May 16, 1947
- Edward C. Boyle November 3, 1949
- John W. McIlvaine July 16, 1953
- D. Malcolm Anderson Jr. August 19, 1955
- Hubert I. Teitelbaum March 17, 1958
- Joseph S. Ammerman June 5, 1961
- Gustave Diamond February 2, 1963
- Richard L. Thornburgh June 4, 1969
- Blair A. Griffith July 7, 1975
- Robert J. Cindrich September 29, 1978
- J. Alan Johnson July 31, 1981
- Charles D. Sheehy January 15, 1989
- Thomas W. Corbett November 30, 1989
- Frederick W. Thieman August 16, 1993
- Linda L. Kelly August 1, 1997
- Harry Litman October 22, 1998
- Linda L. Kelly April 28, 2001
- Mary Beth Buchanan – September 18, 2001
- Robert S. Cessar – November 17, 2009
- David J. Hickton – August 12, 2010
- Soo C. Song (acting) – November 29, 2016
- Scott Brady – December 22, 2017
- Steve Kaufman – February 28, 2021
- Cindy Chung – November 2021
- Troy Rivetti (acting) – February 17, 2023
- Eric G. Olshan – June 12, 2023
- Troy Rivetti – January 20, 2025

== See also ==
- Courts of Pennsylvania
- List of current United States district judges
- List of United States federal courthouses in Pennsylvania
