= Louis Rosenberg (judge) =

American judge (1898-1999)

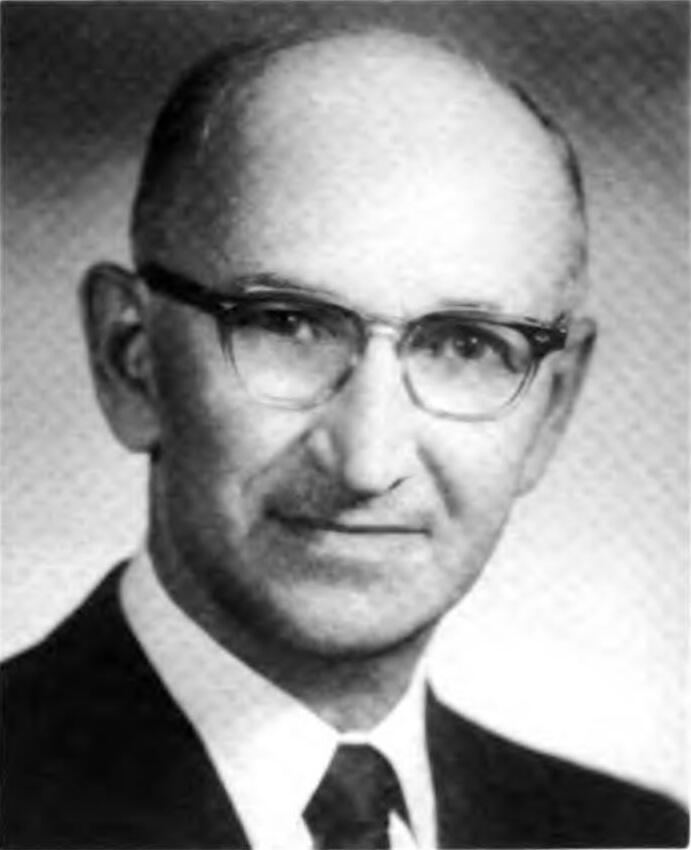

Senior Judge of the United States District Court for the Western District of Pennsylvania
- In office January 5, 1976 – July 2, 1999

Judge of the United States District Court for the Western District of Pennsylvania
- In office November 20, 1961 – January 5, 1976
- Appointed by: John F. Kennedy
- Preceded by: Seat established by 75 Stat. 80
- Succeeded by: Maurice B. Cohill Jr.

Personal details
- Born: Louis Rosenberg; July 5, 1898 Beaver Falls, Pennsylvania
- Died: July 2, 1999 (aged 100) Highland Park, Pennsylvania
- Education: Duquesne University School of Law (LL.B.)

Louis Rosenberg (July 5, 1898 – July 2, 1999) was a United States district judge of the United States District Court for the Western District of Pennsylvania.

== Education and career ==
Born in Beaver Falls, Pennsylvania, Rosenberg received a Bachelor of Laws from Duquesne University School of Law in 1923. He was special counsel for Allegheny County Emergency Relief in 1935. He was special deputy attorney general of the Commonwealth of Pennsylvania from 1936 to 1939. He was special counsel for the Commonwealth of Pennsylvania from 1939 to 1941. He was special assistant city solicitor for the City of Pittsburgh from 1941 to 1956. He was Director of Public Safety for Pittsburgh from 1956 to 1961.

== Federal judicial service ==
Rosenberg received a recess appointment from President John F. Kennedy on November 20, 1961, to the United States District Court for the Western District of Pennsylvania, to a new seat created by 75 Stat. 80. He was nominated to the same seat by President Kennedy on January 15, 1962. He was confirmed by the United States Senate on July 10, 1962, and received his commission on July 12, 1962. He assumed senior status on January 5, 1976. His service was terminated on July 2, 1999, due to his death in Highland Park, Pennsylvania, three days before his 101st birthday.

== See also ==
- List of Jewish American jurists

== Sources ==
Legal offices
Preceded by Seat established by 75 Stat. 80	Judge of the United States District Court for the Western District of Pennsylvania; 1961–1976	Succeeded by Maurice B. Cohill Jr.
