= Charles Prentiss Orr =

American judge

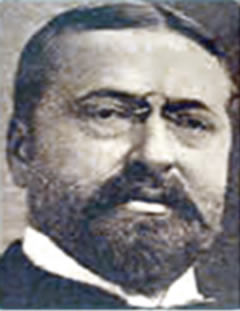

Judge of the United States District Court for the Western District of Pennsylvania
- In office April 8, 1909 – May 16, 1922
- Appointed by: William Howard Taft
- Preceded by: Seat established by 35 Stat 656
- Succeeded by: Robert Murray Gibson

Personal details
- Born: Charles Prentiss Orr; February 22, 1858 Allegheny, Pennsylvania, U.S.
- Died: May 16, 1922 (aged 64) Pittsburgh, Pennsylvania, U.S.
- Education: Hamilton College (A.B.)

Charles Prentiss Orr (February 22, 1858 – May 16, 1922) was a United States district judge of the United States District Court for the Western District of Pennsylvania.

== Education and career ==
Born in Allegheny, Pennsylvania, Orr received an Artium Baccalaureus degree from Hamilton College in 1879 and read law to enter the bar in 1881. He was in private practice in Pittsburgh, Pennsylvania from 1886 to 1909.

== Federal judicial service ==
On March 25, 1909, Orr was nominated by President William Howard Taft to a new seat on the United States District Court for the Western District of Pennsylvania created by 35 Stat. 656. He was confirmed by the United States Senate on April 8, 1909, and received his commission the same day. Orr served in that capacity until his death on May 16, 1922, at his home in Pittsburgh.

== Sources ==
Legal offices
Preceded by Seat established by 35 Stat 656	Judge of the United States District Court for the Western District of Pennsylvania; 1909–1922	Succeeded by Robert Murray Gibson
