= Charles Orr-Ewing =

Charles Orr-Ewing may refer to:

- Charles Lindsay Orr-Ewing (1860–1903), Scottish Conservative MP for Ayr Burghs 1895–1903
- Charles Ian Orr-Ewing, Baron Orr-Ewing (1912–1999), British Conservative MP for Hendon North 1950–1970
