= Edward Dumbauld =

American judge

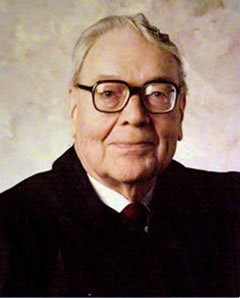

Senior Judge of the United States District Court for the Western District of Pennsylvania
- In office December 31, 1976 – September 6, 1997

Judge of the United States District Court for the Western District of Pennsylvania
- In office August 3, 1961 – December 31, 1976
- Appointed by: John F. Kennedy
- Preceded by: Seat established by 75 Stat. 80
- Succeeded by: Gustave Diamond

Personal details
- Born: Edward Dumbauld; October 26, 1905 Uniontown, Pennsylvania
- Died: September 6, 1997 (aged 91) Uniontown, Pennsylvania
- Education: Princeton University (A.B.); Harvard Law School (LL.B., LL.M.); Leiden University (J.D.)

Edward Dumbauld (October 26, 1905 – September 6, 1997) was a United States district judge of the United States District Court for the Western District of Pennsylvania.

== Education and career ==
Born in Uniontown, Pennsylvania, Dumbauld received an Artium Baccalaureus degree from Princeton University in 1926, a Bachelor of Laws from Harvard Law School in 1929, and a Master of Laws from the same institution in 1930. He received a Juris Doctor from the Leiden University in The Netherlands on June 17, 1932. He was in private practice in Uniontown from 1933 to 1935. From 1936 to 1949, he served as a special assistant in the Antitrust Division of the United States Department of Justice. He returned to private practice in Uniontown from 1949 to 1957, when he became a judge of the Court of Common Pleas in Uniontown, serving until 1961.

== Federal judicial service ==
On August 2, 1961, Dumbauld was nominated by President John F. Kennedy to a new seat on the United States District Court for the Western District of Pennsylvania created by 75 Stat. 80. He was confirmed by the United States Senate on August 2, 1961, receiving his commission on August 3, 1961. He assumed senior status on December 31, 1976, serving in that capacity until his death on September 6, 1997, in Uniontown.

== Scholarship and writings ==
In addition to his legal and judicial duties, Dumbauld wrote extensively for scholars and general readers about the life and work of Thomas Jefferson, the United States Declaration of Independence, and the United States Constitution and United States Bill of Rights, as well as the Renaissance legal philosopher and treatise-writer Hugo Grotius. He was a longtime member of the American Society for Legal History.

His books, many of them standards of American legal-historical literature, include:

- Thomas Jefferson, American Tourist... (Norman: University of Oklahoma Press, 1946)
- The Declaration of Independence and What It Means Today (Norman: University of Oklahoma Press, 1950)
- The Bill of Rights and What It Means Today (Norman: University of Oklahoma Press, 1957; reprint ed., Westport, CT: Greenwood Press, 1979) ISBN 0-313-21215-5
- The Constitution of the United States (Norman: University of Oklahoma Press, 1964)
- The Life and Legal Writings of Hugo Grotius (Norman: University of Oklahoma Press, 1969)
- Thomas Jefferson and the Law (Norman: University of Oklahoma Press, 1978), ISBN 0-8061-1441-X

== Sources ==
Legal offices
Preceded by Seat established by 75 Stat. 80	Judge of the United States District Court for the Western District of Pennsylvania; 1961–1976	Succeeded by Gustave Diamond
