= Rabe Ferguson Marsh Jr. =

American judge (1905–1993)

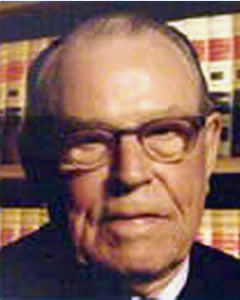

Senior Judge of the United States District Court for the Western District of Pennsylvania
- In office January 31, 1977 – April 19, 1993

Chief Judge of the United States District Court for the Western District of Pennsylvania
- In office 1969–1975
- Preceded by: Wallace Samuel Gourley
- Succeeded by: Herbert Peter Sorg

Judge of the United States District Court for the Western District of Pennsylvania
- In office June 8, 1950 – January 31, 1977
- Appointed by: Harry S. Truman
- Preceded by: Robert Murray Gibson
- Succeeded by: Donald Emil Ziegler

Personal details
- Born: Rabe Ferguson Marsh Jr. April 26, 1905 Greensburg, Pennsylvania
- Died: April 19, 1993 (aged 87) Greensburg, Pennsylvania
- Education: Lafayette College (A.B.); University of Pittsburgh School of Law (LL.B.)

Rabe Ferguson Marsh Jr. (April 26, 1905 – April 19, 1993) was a United States district judge of the United States District Court for the Western District of Pennsylvania.

== Education and career ==
Born in Greensburg, Pennsylvania, Marsh received an Artium Baccalaureus degree from Lafayette College in 1927 and a Bachelor of Laws from the University of Pittsburgh School of Law in 1930. He was in private practice in Greensburg from 1930 to 1950. He was an assistant district attorney of Westmoreland County, Pennsylvania from 1942 to 1950.

== Federal judicial service ==
On March 27, 1950, Marsh was nominated by President Harry S. Truman to a seat on the United States District Court for the Western District of Pennsylvania vacated by Judge Robert Murray Gibson. Marsh was confirmed by the United States Senate on June 2, 1950, and received his commission on June 8. He served as Chief Judge from 1969 to 1975, and assumed senior status on January 31, 1977. Marsh served in that capacity until his death on April 19, 1993, in Greensburg.

== See also ==
- List of United States federal judges by longevity of service

== Sources ==
Legal offices
Preceded by Robert Murray Gibson	Judge of the United States District Court for the Western District of Pennsylvania; 1950–1977	Succeeded by Donald Emil Ziegler
Preceded by Wallace Samuel Gourley	Chief Judge of the United States District Court for the Western District of Pennsylvania; 1969–1975	Succeeded by Herbert Peter Sorg
