= John H. Lamneck =

American judge

Justice of the Ohio Supreme Court
- In office November, 1953 – November 1954
- Appointed by: Frank J. Lausche
- Preceded by: Edward S. Matthias
- Succeeded by: John M. Matthias

Personal details
- Born: John Howard Lamneck; May 3, 1891 Port Washington, Ohio, U.S.
- Died: January 11, 1975 (aged 83) New Philadelphia, Ohio, U.S.
- Resting place: Union Cemetery, Port Washington, Ohio, U.S.
- Party: Democratic
- Spouse: Bertha Thomas
- Children: 3

John Howard Lamneck was a jurist from Tuscarawas County, Ohio, who was appointed to the Ohio Supreme Court in 1953, serving for about a year.

== Youth ==
Lamneck was the son of Philip and Mary Lamneck. His older brother was Arthur P. Lamneck. He was born on May 3, 1891, in Port Washington, Ohio. He received a teaching certificate in 1915, and was later principal and superintendent of the high school in Port Washington.

== Career ==
Lamneck studied law with a local lawyer and also took a course with the LaSalle Extension University of Chicago, Illinois. He passed the Ohio bar on December 5, 1918.

In 1917, Lamneck became a payroll auditor for the Ohio Industrial Commission. He managed the Akron and Toledo branches of the Industrial Commission for six years, and was named by Ohio Governor A. Victor Donahey as chief of the division of workmen's compensation, and as assistant director of industrial relations.

== Judicial ==
In 1924, Lamneck became the youngest probate judge in the state when he won election to the Tuscarawas County, Ohio Probate and Juvenile Court. He was re-elected in 1928, 1932, 1936 and 1940. In 1944, he won a six-year term as County Court of Common Pleas judge.

In 1949, Lamneck resigned from the bench when Governor Frank J. Lausche named him director of public welfare. He held this position until 1953, when Lausche appointed him to the Ohio Supreme Court on November 17 to fill the seat of Edward S. Matthias, who had died November 2.

In 1954, the constitution required an election to fill the remaining two years of Edward Matthias's term. Lamneck lost to the Republican candidate John M. Matthias, Edward's son. When the election results were final, John Matthias assumed the seat.

Lamneck was in private practice until he was again elected to the Tuscarawas County Court of Common Pleas in 1960. He was re-elected in 1966, and retired in 1972. He was married to Bertha Thomas in 1912 and had three children. Lamneck died January 11, 1975, aged 83, in New Philadelphia, Ohio, and is buried in Port Washington, Ohio.

== Publications ==
- Lamneck, John Howard (1961). From Lamplight to Satellite, an Autobiography. Christopher Publishing House. OCLC 604670.
- Lamneck, John H. (1966). These are my jewels. Gordon Printing. OCLC 11492667.
