= List of elections in 1907 =

The following elections occurred in the year 1907.

== Africa ==
=== Liberia ===
- 1907 Liberian general election
- 1907 Liberian constitutional referendum

== Asia ==
- 1907 Philippine Assembly elections
- January 1907 Russian legislative election
- October 1907 Russian legislative election

== Europe ==
- 1907 Cisleithanian legislative election

=== Finland ===
- 1907 Finnish parliamentary election

=== Germany ===
- 1907 German federal election

=== Malta ===
- 1907 Maltese general election

=== Montenegro ===
- 1907 Montenegrin parliamentary election

=== Romania ===
- 1907 Romanian general election

=== Russia ===
- January 1907 Russian legislative election
- October 1907 Russian legislative election

=== Spain ===
- 1907 Spanish general election

=== United Kingdom ===
- 1907 Aberdeen South by-election
- 1907 Banffshire by-election
- 1907 Belfast West by-election
- 1907 Brigg by-election
- 1907 Colne Valley by-election
- 1907 East Derbyshire by-election
- 1907 East Staffordshire by-election
- 1907 East Tyrone by-election
- 1907 Hexham by-election
- 1907 Horncastle by-election
- 1907 Jarrow by-election
- 1907 Kirkcudbrightshire by-election
- 1907 Liverpool Kirkdale by-election
- 1907 North Galway by-election
- 1907 North Kilkenny by-election
- 1907 North Longford by-election
- 1907 North West Meath by-election
- 1907 Rutland by-election
- 1907 South Longford by-election
- 1907 Stepney by-election
- 1907 West Denbighshire by-election
- 1907 West Hull by-election
- 1907 West Staffordshire by-election
- 1907 Wimbledon by-election

== North America ==
=== Canada ===
- 1907 British Columbia general election
- 1907 Edmonton municipal by-election
- 1907 Edmonton municipal election
- 1907 Manitoba general election
- 1907 Yukon general election

=== United States ===
- 1907 New York state election
- 1907 Oklahoma elections

==== United States gubernatorial ====
- 1907 Kentucky gubernatorial election
- 1907 Maryland gubernatorial election
- 1907 Mississippi gubernatorial election
- 1907 Massachusetts gubernatorial election
- 1907 New Jersey gubernatorial election
- 1907 Oklahoma gubernatorial election
- 1907 Rhode Island gubernatorial election
- 1907 United States gubernatorial elections

==== United States House of Representatives ====
- 1907 United States House of Representatives elections
- 1907 United States House of Representatives elections in Oklahoma

==== United States Senate ====
- 1906–07 United States Senate elections
- 1907–08 United States Senate elections
- 1907 United States Senate elections in Oklahoma
- 1907 United States Senate special election in Wisconsin

==== United States mayoral elections ====
- 1907 Baltimore mayoral election
- 1907 Boston mayoral election
- 1907 Chicago mayoral election
- 1907 Columbus, Ohio mayoral election
- 1907 San Diego mayoral election
- 1907 San Francisco mayoral election

== Oceania ==
=== Australia ===
- 1907 Echuca by-election
- 1907 Blayney state by-election
- 1907 Korong state by-election
- 1907 New South Wales state election
- 1907 Queensland state election
- 1907 Victorian state election

=== New Zealand ===
- 1907 Taranaki by-election

== See also ==
- Category:1907 elections
