= 1907 Columbus, Ohio mayoral election =

- November 5, 1907
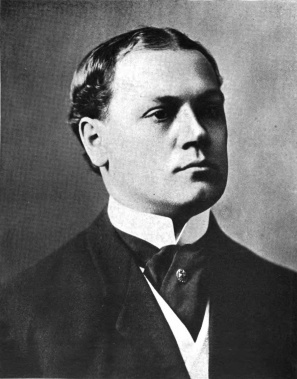

Candidate	Charles A. Bond	Thomas A. Duncan
Party	Republican	Democratic
Mayor before election
De Witt C. Badger
Democratic
Elected mayor
Charles A. Bond
Republican

The Columbus mayoral election of 1907 was the 56th mayoral election in Columbus, Ohio. It was held on Tuesday, November 5, 1907. Republican party nominee Charles A. Bond defeated Judge and Democratic party nominee Thomas A. Duncan.

== Bibliography ==
- "An Independent Spirit Spreads Over the State". The Plain Dealer. Cleveland, Ohio. November 6, 1907. p. 4, col. 1.
