= Ohio's 12th congressional district =

U.S. House district for Ohio

Coordinates: 40°14′22″N 82°36′49″W

- Interactive map of district boundaries
- Representative: Troy Balderson; R–Zanesville
- Population (2025): 811,296
- Median household income: $75,804
- Ethnicity: 88.1% White; 4.1% Two or more races; 3.8% Black; 1.9% Hispanic; 1.5% Asian; 0.5% other
- Cook PVI: R+16

Ohio's 12th congressional district is a United States congressional district in central Ohio, covering Athens County, Coshocton County, Fairfield County, Guernsey County, Knox County, Licking County, Morgan County, Muskingum County and Perry County along with parts of Delaware, Holmes and Tuscarawas counties. The district includes communities east of Columbus including Zanesville, Cambridge, and Mount Vernon. It is currently represented by Troy Balderson, a member of the Republican Party. Balderson took office following a special election held on August 7, 2018, to replace Rep. Pat Tiberi, who had resigned on January 15, 2018. Balderson was then re-elected in the 2018 general election two months later.

From 2003 to 2013 the district included eastern Columbus, including most of its heavily African-American neighborhoods. The district also took in most of its northern suburbs, including Westerville. It was one of two districts that split the state's capital city, the other being the 15th district. For most of the time from the 1980s to the 2000s, it was considered to be less Republican than the 15th, in part due to its large black population. However, redistricting after the 2010 census drew nearly all of the 15th's black constituents into the 3rd district, while the 15th was pushed into more exurban and Republican areas north and east of the capital.

It has been in Republican hands since 1920, except for an eight-year stretch in the 1930s and a two-year term in 1980 where the Democratic Party held the seat; in both instances the Democratic incumbent was later defeated by a GOP challenger. In the 2004 presidential election George W. Bush narrowly won the district against John Kerry, 51% to 49%. However, in the 2008 presidential election, Democratic candidate Barack Obama won the 12th district by a margin of 53% to 46%. After the 2011 redistricting cycle, the district has since been won in larger margins by Republican presidential candidates.

In the 2018 special election, Balderson was endorsed by prominent Republicans including President Donald Trump, Governor of Ohio John Kasich (who represented the 12th from 1983 to 2001), and former Rep. Tiberi. The Democratic candidate was Danny O'Connor. The winner was not immediately clear following the unexpectedly competitive August 7 election. Only on August 24 was Balderson officially declared the winner of the special election, which witnessed a significant swing away from the Republican Party as Balderson won with a margin of less than 1%, while fellow Republican Trump had carried the district by 11% in the 2016 presidential election. In 2020 the district swung heavily back to the Republicans as Balderson won by over 14%.

== Recent election results from statewide races ==
=== 2023-2027 boundaries ===
Year	Office	Results
2008	President	McCain 54% - 43%
2012	President	Romney 56% - 44%
2016	President	Trump 62% - 33%
2016	Senate	Portman 67% - 29%
2018	Senate	Renacci 56% - 44%
2018	Governor	DeWine 60% - 37%
2018	Secretary of State	LaRose 61% - 37%
2018	Treasurer	Sprague 63% - 37%
2018	Auditor	Faber 57% - 39%
2018	Attorney General	Yost 63% - 37%
2020	President	Trump 65% - 34%
2022	Senate	Vance 63% - 37%
2022	Governor	DeWine 72% - 28%
2022	Secretary of State	LaRose 70% - 30%
2022	Treasurer	Sprague 69% - 31%
2022	Auditor	Faber 69% - 31%
2022	Attorney General	Yost 71% - 29%
2024	President	Trump 66% - 33%
2024	Senate	Moreno 60% - 36%

=== 2027–2033 boundaries ===
Year	Office	Results
2008	President	McCain 57% - 41%
2012	President	Romney 59% - 41%
2016	President	Trump 63% - 32%
2016	Senate	Portman 68% - 27%
2018	Senate	Renacci 57% - 43%
2018	Governor	DeWine 61% - 36%
2018	Attorney General	Yost 64% - 36%
2020	President	Trump 64% - 35%
2022	Senate	Vance 63% - 37%
2022	Governor	DeWine 71% - 29%
2022	Secretary of State	LaRose 69% - 30%
2022	Treasurer	Sprague 68% - 32%
2022	Auditor	Faber 69% - 31%
2022	Attorney General	Yost 70% - 30%
2024	President	Trump 65% - 35%
2024	Senate	Moreno 59% - 37%

== Composition ==
For the 118th and successive Congresses (based on redistricting following the 2020 census), the district contains all or portions of the following counties, townships, and municipalities:

Athens County (24)

All 24 townships and municipalities

Coshocton, County (28)

All 28 townships and municipalities

Delaware County (9)

Berkshire Township, Galena, Genoa Township, Harlem Township, Kingston Township, Porter Township, Sunbury, Trenton Township, Westerville (part; also 4th)

Fairfield County (31)

All 31 townships and municipalities

Guernsey County (28)

All 31 townships and municipalities

Holmes County (14)

Baltic (shared with Tuscarawas County), Berlin Township, Glenmont, Hardy Township, Killbuck, Killbuck Township, Knox Township, Mechanic Township, Millersburg, Monroe Township, Paint Township, Richland Township, Salt Creek Township (part; also 7th), Walnut Creek Township

Knox County (30)

All 30 townships and municipalities

Morgan County (18)

All 18 townships and municipalities

Muskingum County (36)

All 36 townships and municipalities

Licking County (41)

All 41 townships and municipalities

Perry County (26)

All 26 townships and municipalities

Tuscarawas County (20)

Auburn Township, Baltic (shared with Holmes County), Bucks Township, Clay Township, Dover Township, Franklin Township, Gnadenhutten, Jefferson Township, Newcomerstown, Oxford Township, Perry Township, Port Washington, Rush Township, Salem Township, Stone Creek, Strasburg, Sugarcreek, Sugar Creek Township, Washington Township, Wayne Township

== List of members representing the district ==
Member	Party	Year(s)	Cong ress	Electoral history	Counties represented
District established March 4, 1823
John Sloane (Wooster)	Democratic-Republican	March 4, 1823 – March 3, 1825	18th 19th 20th	Redistricted from the 6th district and re-elected in 1822. Re-elected in 1824. Re-elected in 1826. Lost re-election.	
John Sloane (Wooster)	Anti-Jacksonian	March 4, 1825 – March 3, 1829	18th 19th 20th	Redistricted from the 6th district and re-elected in 1822. Re-elected in 1824. Re-elected in 1826. Lost re-election.	
John Thomson (New Lisbon)	Jacksonian	March 4, 1829 – March 3, 1833	21st 22nd	Elected in 1828. Re-elected in 1830. Redistricted to the 17th district.	
Robert Mitchell (Zanesville)	Jacksonian	March 4, 1833 – March 3, 1835	23rd	Elected in 1832. [data missing]	
Elias Howell (Newark)	Anti-Jacksonian	March 4, 1835 – March 3, 1837	24th	Elected in 1834. [data missing]	
Alexander Harper (Zanesville)	Whig	March 4, 1837 – March 3, 1839	25th	Elected in 1836. [data missing]	
Jonathan Taylor (Newark)	Democratic	March 4, 1839 – March 3, 1841	26th	Elected in 1838. [data missing]	
Joshua Mathiot (Newark)	Whig	March 4, 1841 – March 3, 1843	27th	Elected in 1840. [data missing]	
Samuel Finley Vinton (Gallipolis)	Whig	March 4, 1843 – March 3, 1851	28th 29th 30th 31st	Elected in 1843. Re-elected in 1844. Re-elected in 1846. Re-elected in 1848. [data missing]	
John Welch (Athens)	Whig	March 4, 1851 – March 3, 1853	32nd	Elected in 1850. [data missing]	
Edson B. Olds (Circleville)	Democratic	March 4, 1853 – March 3, 1855	33rd	Redistricted from the 9th district and re-elected in 1852. [data missing]	
Samuel Galloway (Columbus)	Anti-Nebraska	March 4, 1855 – March 3, 1857	34th	Elected in 1854. [data missing]	
Samuel S. Cox (Columbus)	Democratic	March 4, 1857 – March 3, 1863	35th 36th 37th	Elected in 1856. Re-elected in 1858. Re-elected in 1860. Redistricted to the 7th district.	
William E. Finck (Somerset)	Democratic	March 4, 1863 – March 3, 1867	38th 39th	Elected in 1862. Re-elected in 1864. [data missing]	
Philadelph Van Trump (Lancaster)	Democratic	March 4, 1867 – March 3, 1873	40th 41st 42nd	Elected in 1866. Re-elected in 1868. Re-elected in 1870. [data missing]	
Hugh J. Jewett (Columbus)	Democratic	March 4, 1873 – June 23, 1874	43rd	Elected in 1872. Resigned to become President of the Erie Railroad.	
Vacant		June 23, 1874 – December 7, 1874	43rd		
William E. Finck (Somerset)	Democratic	December 7, 1874 – March 3, 1875	43rd	Elected to finish Jewett's term. [data missing]	
Ansel T. Walling (Circleville)	Democratic	March 4, 1875 – March 3, 1877	44th	Elected in 1874. [data missing]	
Thomas Ewing Jr. (Lancaster)	Democratic	March 4, 1877 – March 3, 1879	45th	Elected in 1876. Redistricted to the 10th district.	
Henry S. Neal (Ironton)	Republican	March 4, 1879 – March 3, 1881	46th	Redistricted from the 11th district and re-elected in 1878. Redistricted to the 11th district.	
George L. Converse (Columbus)	Democratic	March 4, 1881 – March 3, 1883	47th	Redistricted from the 9th district and re-elected in 1880. Redistricted to the 13th district.	
Alphonso Hart (Hillsboro)	Republican	March 4, 1883 – March 3, 1885	48th	Elected in 1882. [data missing]	
Albert C. Thompson (Portsmouth)	Republican	March 4, 1885 – March 3, 1887	49th	Elected in 1884. Redistricted to the 11th district.	
Jacob J. Pugsley (Hillsboro)	Republican	March 4, 1887 – March 3, 1891	50th 51st	Elected in 1886. Re-elected in 1888. [data missing]	
William H. Enochs (Ironton)	Republican	March 4, 1891 – March 3, 1893	52nd	Elected in 1890. Redistricted to the 10th district.	
Joseph H. Outhwaite (Columbus)	Democratic	March 4, 1893 – March 3, 1895	53rd	Redistricted from the 9th district and re-elected in 1892. [data missing]	
David K. Watson (Columbus)	Republican	March 4, 1895 – March 3, 1897	54th	Elected in 1894. [data missing]	
John J. Lentz (Columbus)	Democratic	March 4, 1897 – March 3, 1901	55th 56th	Elected in 1896. Re-elected in 1898. [data missing]	
Emmett Tompkins (Columbus)	Republican	March 4, 1901 – March 3, 1903	57th	Elected in 1900. [data missing]	
De Witt C. Badger (Columbus)	Democratic	March 4, 1903 – March 3, 1905	58th	Elected in 1902. [data missing]	
Edward L. Taylor Jr. (Columbus)	Republican	March 4, 1905 – March 3, 1913	59th 60th 61st 62nd	Elected in 1904. Re-elected in 1906. Re-elected in 1908. Re-elected in 1910. [data missing]	
Clement L. Brumbaugh (Columbus)	Democratic	March 4, 1913 – March 3, 1921	63rd 64th 65th 66th	Elected in 1912. Re-elected in 1914. Re-elected in 1916. Re-elected in 1918. Retired.	
John C. Speaks (Columbus)	Republican	March 4, 1921 – March 3, 1931	67th 68th 69th 70th 71st	Elected in 1920. Re-elected in 1922. Re-elected in 1924. Re-elected in 1926. Re-elected in 1928. Lost re-election.	
Arthur P. Lamneck (Columbus)	Democratic	March 4, 1931 – January 3, 1939	72nd 73rd 74th 75th	Elected in 1930. Re-elected in 1932. Re-elected in 1934. Re-elected in 1936. Lost re-election.	
John M. Vorys (Columbus)	Republican	January 3, 1939 – January 3, 1959	76th 77th 78th 79th 80th 81st 82nd 83rd 84th 85th	Elected in 1938. Re-elected in 1940. Re-elected in 1942. Re-elected in 1944. Re-elected in 1946. Re-elected in 1948. Re-elected in 1950. Re-elected in 1952. Re-elected in 1954. Re-elected in 1956. Retired.	
Samuel L. Devine (Columbus)	Republican	January 3, 1959 – January 3, 1981	86th 87th 88th 89th 90th 91st 92nd 93rd 94th 95th 96th	Elected in 1958. Re-elected in 1960. Re-elected in 1962. Re-elected in 1964. Re-elected in 1966. Re-elected in 1968. Re-elected in 1970. Re-elected in 1972. Re-elected in 1974. Re-elected in 1976. Re-elected in 1978. Lost re-election.	
Bob Shamansky (Columbus)	Democratic	January 3, 1981 – January 3, 1983	97th	Elected in 1980. Lost re-election.	
John Kasich (Westerville)	Republican	January 3, 1983 – January 3, 2001	98th 99th 100th 101st 102nd 103rd 104th 105th 106th	Elected in 1982. Re-elected in 1984. Re-elected in 1986. Re-elected in 1988. Re-elected in 1990. Re-elected in 1992. Re-elected in 1994. Re-elected in 1996. Re-elected in 1998. Retired to run for U.S. President.	
Pat Tiberi (Galena)	Republican	January 3, 2001 – January 15, 2018	107th 108th 109th 110th 111th 112th 113th 114th 115th	Elected in 2000. Re-elected in 2002. Re-elected in 2004. Re-elected in 2006. Re-elected in 2008. Re-elected in 2010. Re-elected in 2012. Re-elected in 2014. Re-elected in 2016. Resigned to lead the Ohio Business Roundtable.	
Pat Tiberi (Galena)	Republican	January 3, 2001 – January 15, 2018	107th 108th 109th 110th 111th 112th 113th 114th 115th	Elected in 2000. Re-elected in 2002. Re-elected in 2004. Re-elected in 2006. Re-elected in 2008. Re-elected in 2010. Re-elected in 2012. Re-elected in 2014. Re-elected in 2016. Resigned to lead the Ohio Business Roundtable.	2003–2013
Pat Tiberi (Galena)	Republican	January 3, 2001 – January 15, 2018	107th 108th 109th 110th 111th 112th 113th 114th 115th	Elected in 2000. Re-elected in 2002. Re-elected in 2004. Re-elected in 2006. Re-elected in 2008. Re-elected in 2010. Re-elected in 2012. Re-elected in 2014. Re-elected in 2016. Resigned to lead the Ohio Business Roundtable.	2013–2023
Vacant		January 15, 2018 – August 7, 2018	115th		2013–2023
Troy Balderson (Zanesville)	Republican	August 7, 2018 – present	115th 116th 117th 118th 119th	Elected to finish Tiberi's term. Re-elected in 2018. Re-elected in 2020. Re-elected in 2022. Re-elected in 2024. Re-elected in 2026.	2013–2023
Troy Balderson (Zanesville)	Republican	August 7, 2018 – present	115th 116th 117th 118th 119th	Elected to finish Tiberi's term. Re-elected in 2018. Re-elected in 2020. Re-elected in 2022. Re-elected in 2024. Re-elected in 2026.	2023–2027

== Recent election results ==
The following chart shows historic election results.

Year	Democratic	Republican	Other
1920	Arthur P. Lamneck: 43,845	√ John C. Speaks: 62,247	Enoch B. Eubanks: 1,481
1922	H. Sage Valentine: 37,875	√ John C. Speaks (Incumbent): 47,265	William Garminden (SL): 632
1924	Lowry F. Sater: 41,291	√ John C. Speaks (Incumbent): 58,705	
1926	H. S. Atkinson: 31,724	√ John C. Speaks (Incumbent): 41,119	
1928	Carl H. Valentine: 50,216	√ John C. Speaks (Incumbent): 82,574	
1930	√ Arthur P. Lamneck: 59,330	John C. Speaks (Incumbent): 43,840	
1932	√ Arthur P. Lamneck (Incumbent): 63,135	John C. Speaks: 62,704	
1934	√ Arthur P. Lamneck (Incumbent): 63,396	John C. Speaks: 50,386	
1936	√ Arthur P. Lamneck (Incumbent): 88,222	Grant P. Ward: 64,766	
1938	Arthur P. Lamneck (Incumbent): 62,026	√ Jonn M. Vorys: 64,409	
1940	Arthur P. Lamneck: 87,115	√ John M. Vorys (Incumbent): 91,767	
1942	Arthur P. Lamneck: 40,290	√ John M. Vorys (Incumbent): 56,558	
1944	Forrest F. Smith: 82,503	√ John M. Vorys (Incumbent): 97,856	
1946	Arthur P. Lamneck: 45,779	√ John M. Vorys (Incumbent): 74,691	
1948	Robert M. Draper: 87,770	√ John M. Vorys (Incumbent): 95,575	
1950	John W. Guy: 65,860	√ John M. Vorys (Incumbent): 117,396	
1952	George T. Tarbutton: 81,665	√ John M. Vorys (Incumbent): 134,693	
1954	Jacob F. Myers: 59,210	√ John M. Vorys (Incumbent): 94,585	
1956	Walter J. Shapter Jr.: 79,597	√ John M. Vorys (Incumbent): 128,682	
1958	Walter J. Shapter Jr.: 84,470	√ Samuel L. Devine: 100,684	
1960	Richard E. Liming: 90,894	√ Samuel L. Devine (Incumbent): 140,236	
1962	Paul D. Cassidy: 60,563	√ Samuel L. Devine (Incumbent): 130,316	
1964	Robert L. Van Heyde: 118,299	√ Samuel L. Devine (Incumbent): 146,971	
1966	Bob Shamansky: 39,140	√ Samuel L. Devine (Incumbent): 70,102	
1968	Herbert J. Pfeifer: 51,202	√ Samuel L. Devine (Incumbent): 106,664	
1970	James W. Goodrich: 60,538	√ Samuel L. Devine (Incumbent): 82,486	
1972	James W. Goodrich: 81,074	√ Samuel L. Devine (Incumbent): 103,655	
1974	Francine Ryan: 70,818	√ Samuel L. Devine (Incumbent): 73,303	
1976	Francine Ryan: 89,424	√ Samuel L. Devine (Incumbent): 90,987	William Roger "Bill" Moss (I): 15,429
1978	James L. Baumann: 61,698	√ Samuel L. Devine (Incumbent): 81,573	
1980	√ Bob Shamansky: 108,690	Samuel L. Devine (Incumbent): 98,110	
1982	Bob Shamansky (Incumbent): 82,753	√ John Kasich: 88,335	Russell A. Lewis (L): 3,939
1984	Richard S. Sloan: 65,215	√ John Kasich (Incumbent): 148,899	
1986	Timothy C. Jochim: 42,727	√ John Kasich (Incumbent): 117,905	
1988	Mark P. Brown: 50,782	√ John Kasich (Incumbent): 204,892	
1990	Mike Gelpi: 50,784	√ John Kasich (Incumbent): 130,495	
1992	Bob Fitrakis: 68,761	√ John Kasich (Incumbent): 170,297	
1994	Cynthia L. Ruccia: 57,294	√ John Kasich (Incumbent): 114,608	
1996	Cynthia L. Ruccia: 78,762	√ John Kasich (Incumbent): 151,667	Barbara Ann Edelman (N): 7,005
1998	Edward S. Brown: 60,694	√ John Kasich (Incumbent): 124,197	
2000	Maryellen O'Shaughnessy: 115,432	√ Pat Tiberi: 139,242	Charles Ed Jordan: 1,566; Nick Hogan (L): 4,546; Gregory B. Richey (N): 2,600
2002	Edward S. Brown: 64,707	√ Pat Tiberi (Incumbent): 116,982	
2004	Edward S. Brown: 122,109	√ Pat Tiberi (Incumbent): 198,912	
2006	Robert N. Shamansky: 126,573	√ Pat Tiberi (Incumbent): 198,723	
2008	David Robinson: 152,234	√ Pat Tiberi (Incumbent): 197,447	Steven Linnabary (L): 10,707
2010	Paula Brooks: 110,307	√ Pat Tiberi (Incumbent): 150,163	Travis Irvine (L): 8,710
2012	Jim Reese: 134,614	√ Pat Tiberi (Incumbent): 233,874	
2014	David Tibbs: 61,360	√ Pat Tiberi (Incumbent): 150,573	Bob Hart (G): 9,148
2016	Ed Albertson: 112,638	√ Pat Tiberi (Incumbent): 251,266	Joe Manchik (G): 13,474 Write-in: 156
2018 (Special)	Danny O'Connor: 102,648	√ Troy Balderson: 104,328	Joe Manchik (G): 1,165
2018	Danny O'Connor: 161,251	√ Troy Balderson (Incumbent): 175,677	Joe Manchik (G): 4,718 Write-in: 71
2020	Alaina Shearer: 182,847	√ Troy Balderson (Incumbent): 241,790	John S. Stewart (L): 13,035
2022	Amy Rippel-Elton: 84,893	√ Troy Balderson (Incumbent): 191,344	
2024	Jerrad Christian: 119,738	√ Troy Balderson (Incumbent): 260,450	

== See also ==
- Ohio's congressional districts
- List of United States congressional districts
