= John M. Matthias =

American judge

Associate Justice of the Ohio Supreme Court
- In office December 16, 1954 – September 25, 1970
- Preceded by: John H. Lamneck
- Succeeded by: Robert E. Leach

Personal details
- Born: John Marshall Matthias; January 20, 1903 Van Wert, Ohio, U.S.
- Died: January 25, 1973 (aged 70) Upper Arlington, Ohio, U.S.
- Resting place: Green Lawn Cemetery, Columbus, Ohio, U.S.
- Party: Republican
- Spouse: Lois Kirkpatrick
- Children: 1
- Education: Ohio State University; Ohio State University College of Law; Franklin University Law School

John Marshall Matthias (January 20, 1903– January 25, 1973) was a Republican politician from Columbus, Ohio who served in the Ohio House of Representatives and followed his father as a justice of the Ohio Supreme Court, serving 1954 to 1970.

Matthias was the son of Edward Shiloh and Mary F. (Crouch) Matthias. He was born January 20, 1903, in Van Wert, Ohio. His family moved to Columbus, Ohio in 1915, when his father was elected to the Ohio Supreme Court. He graduated from The Ohio State University in 1928, attended both Ohio State University Law School and Franklin University Law School, and was admitted to the bar in 1931.

From 1931 to 1939, Matthias was in private practice of law in Columbus, was elected to the Ohio House of Representatives from Franklin County, Ohio in 1934, lost re-election in 1936, but was elected again in 1938. He was elected to the Columbus Municipal Court in 1939, and was sworn in by his father on January 1, 1940. In 1944, Governor John W. Bricker appointed Matthias presiding judge of the Columbus Municipal Court, and he was elected to six-year terms in 1945 and 1951.

Matthias's father died in 1953, and Governor Frank Lausche appointed Democratic judge John H. Lamneck to the seat. John M. Matthias ran for the remaining two years of his father's term in 1954, winning the Republican primary without party support, and defeating Lamneck in 86 of 88 Ohio counties. He won a six-year term in 1956, and was re-elected in 1962 and 1968.

At the beginning of 1970, Matthias could not perform his duties due to failing health, and Robert E. Leach sat on assignment for him. Matthias resigned September 25, 1970, and Governor Jim Rhodes named Leach to replace him.

Matthias married Lois Kirkpatrick on March 20, 1939. They had one son, the writer and educator, John Matthias (b. 1941). John M. Matthais died at his Upper Arlington, Ohio home on January 25, 1973, and was buried at Green Lawn Cemetery
