= Warren Ballentine =

American lawyer

- Born: May 13, 1973 (age 53); Chicago, Illinois
- Presenting career
- Show: The Warren Ballentine Show
- Country: United States

Warren Ballentine (born May 13, 1973) is an American motivational speaker, attorney, political activist, and radio talk show host.

== Biography ==
=== Early years ===
Ballentine was born and raised on Chicago's South Side, where he attended and graduated from Lindblom High School in 1992. He is an alumnus of Chicago State University in Chicago, Illinois, and graduated from law school at Ohio Northern University Pettit College of Law in Ada, Ohio. Ballentine joined the Iota Nu Sigma Alumni chapter of Phi Beta Sigma fraternity.

=== Attorney Years ===
Upon completion of law school, Ballentine worked as a prosecutor and as a guardian ad litem before going into private practice. He has tried a multitude of cases including: murder, discrimination, sexual assault, police brutality, drunk driving, drugs, gang violence, and domestic relations. He had been admitted to multiple state bars. In 2015, Ballentine was suspended in North Carolina due to his felony convictions. He was disbarred in 2016. On August 26, 2015, the Illinois Attorney Registration and Disciplinary Committee, the agency that licenses Illinois lawyers, filed a complaint against Ballentine based on his federal fraud conviction. In 2018, Ballentine was disbarred in Illinois.

=== Radio career ===
"The Warren Ballentine Show" was syndicated in 137 media markets through Radio One, and was one of the highest-rated urban talk shows in the nation. The show had been covered numerous times by the media since it hit the airwaves. Radio One cancelled the show after Ballentine was indicted.

On his show he discussed ideas and issues targeted not just to the African-American audience, but to a wider audience as well. Ballentine had championed the call for action for the Jena 6 and called for the "National Economic Blackout".

Ballentine was described by The New York Times as "one of black talk radio's new stars". He led the Radio One (Company)|Radio ONE national voter registration campaign. Covering both the Democratic National Convention and the Republican National Conventions, as well as the Congressional Black Caucus; Ballentine's show had featured such high-profile guests as President Barack Obama, Secretary of State Hillary Clinton, Al Sharpton, and Allen Gravitt. Additionally, Ballentine was a recurring guest and correspondent for CNN and Fox Business News.

=== Controversy ===
On Oct. 16, 2009, Ballentine, told Juan Williams "You can go back to the porch, Juan. You can go back. It's ok."

=== Federal Criminal Conviction ===
On January 24, 2013, a federal grand jury in Illinois returned a six-count indictment against Ballentine, charging him with one count of fraud, in violation of 18 U.S.C. §1341; one count of mail and wire fraud, in violation 18 U.S.C. §1343; two counts of bank fraud, in violation of 18 U.S.C. §1344; and two counts of making false statements to financial institutions, in violation of 18 U.S.C. §1014. Ballentine and his conspirators fraudulently caused lenders to make at least 28 loans totaling approximately $10 million. Ballentine fought the charges and was represented by a legal team that included Harvard professor Charles Ogletree, who has Alzheimer's. His trial was delayed when one of his lawyers asked to be removed from the case because Ballentine was not cooperating with him. On October 24, 2014, after a four-day trial, a jury found Ballentine guilty on every count. They had deliberated only an hour. On July 21, 2015, a federal judge sentenced the convicted Ballentine to one day in prison, time considered served, three years of supervised release, and payment of an assessment in the amount of $600.00, and restitution in the amount of $140,940.00. On December 22, 2016, the U.S. Seventh Circuit Court of Appeals dismissed Ballentine's appeal of his conviction as frivolous.
