= Jason M. Walsh =

Washington County District Attorney

District Attorney of Washington County
- Incumbent
- Assumed office August 23, 2021
- Preceded by: Eugene A. Vittone

Personal details
- Born: Donora, Pennsylvania
- Party: Republican
- Education: Saint Francis University (BA); Ohio Northern University (JD)

Jason M. Walsh is an American attorney and politician of the Republican Party. He has been the District Attorney of Washington County, Pennsylvania, since 2021.

== Education ==
Walsh attended Saint Francis University in Loretto, Pennsylvania from 1989 until graduating Summa Cum Laude from the honors college in 1993.

After completing his bachelor's degree, Walsh then attended Ohio Northern University Claude W. Pettit College of Law. He received his Juris Doctor degree there in 1996 and graduated with Distinction.

== Career ==
Upon graduating law school, Jason Walsh joined Herman J. Bigi in general practice in 1996. During this time, he practiced law with a concentration in Criminal Law, DUI, White Collar Crime, as well as all other areas of law. While in private practice, Walsh served as Washington County Children and Youth Services Solicitor for nine years.

After 20 years of working for his private practice, Walsh joined the Washington County District Attorney's Office as Deputy District Attorney in September 2016. Walsh was appointed to First Assistant District Attorney by District Attorney Eugene A. Vittone in 2020.

Walsh was sworn in as the District Attorney of Washington County on August 23, 2021, after the death of Eugene A. Vittone. During Walsh's DA tenure, he has prosecuted several felonies, including homicides.

=== 2023 Election ===
Walsh ran unopposed for the Republican nominee for the office of Washington County District Attorney in the May 2023 primary. Walsh was the Republican candidate for the office of Washington County District Attorney for the November 2023 general election.

On November 7, 2023, Walsh won his first full term with 61% of the vote.

=== Support for capital punishment ===
Walsh has sought the death penalty in cases where the accused is charged with homicide in the first-degree. Under Pennsylvania law, an accused person may only receive a death penalty sentence after they have been convicted of first-degree homicide. The guilt trial of capital murder case is separate from the sentencing trial, as consistent with the Pennsylvania criminal code.

Walsh has voiced intention to seek the death penalty in specific cases involving the killing of infants, all of which were under six months old. He has sought the death penalty in the case of the killing of a convenient store worker. He has also sought the death penalty for a case where the victim was killed by being burned alive.

== Personal life ==
Jason Walsh is a lifelong resident of Washington County, he grew up in Donora, Pennsylvania. Jason also has a brother, Justin Walsh, who has been a judge in Westmoreland County since 2019.
