= Bob Shamansky =

American politician

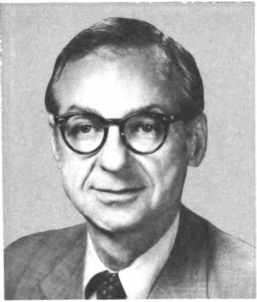
- Official portrait, 1981

Member of the U.S. House of Representatives from Ohio's 12th district
- In office January 3, 1981 – January 3, 1983
- Preceded by: Samuel L. Devine
- Succeeded by: John Kasich

Personal details
- Born: Robert Norton Shamansky; April 18, 1927 Columbus, Ohio, U.S.
- Died: August 11, 2011 (aged 84) Columbus, Ohio, U.S.
- Resting place: New Agudas Achim Cemetery; Columbus, Ohio, U.S.
- Party: Democratic
- Education: Ohio State University (BA); Harvard University (LLB)

Military service
- Allegiance: United States
- Branch/service: United States Army
- Years of service: 1950–1952
- Unit: Counterintelligence Corps

Robert Norton Shamansky (April 18, 1927 – August 11, 2011) was an American Democratic politician and attorney from the state of Ohio. He served in the U.S. House of Representatives for a single term from 1981 until 1983. In 2018, the Jewish Telegraphic Agency wrote that "Shamansky's life was marked by hardship, Jewish pride and tilting at windmills".

== Early life ==
Shamansky was born in 1927 in Columbus, the son of Sarah (Greenberg) and Harry Solomon Shamansky. He attended Bexley High School. He was a 1947 graduate of Ohio State University and a 1950 graduate of Harvard Law School. He was subsequently admitted to the bar in 1950. He was also a Special Agent in the United States Army's Counter Intelligence Corps from 1950 until 1952. He joined the Army as a private and was initially stationed in Georgia, followed by duty at Fort George G. Meade, Maryland.

== Political career ==
In 1966, Shamansky ran for a seat in the U.S. House of Representatives. However, he lost to Republican incumbent Samuel L. Devine.

=== Congress ===
Fourteen years later, in 1980, Shamansky challenged Devine again. This time, he was successful in unseating the long-time incumbent Devine, becoming the first Democrat to represent the district since 1939. He was also the first Democrat to represent a significant portion of the state capital, Columbus, since 1967.

As a member of the 97th Congress, Shamansky served on the House Foreign Affairs Committee, and as a member of the Science and Technology Committee.

=== Defeat ===
In 1982, after reapportionment, Shamansky's district absorbed a large chunk of the more Republican-leaning 17th District. He was defeated in his bid for re-election by future Governor John Kasich.

In 2006, Shamansky ran for his old congressional seat. However, the 12th had been significantly redrawn since he'd last served in Congress, and he lost to Kasich's successor, Pat Tiberi, by 14 points.

== Death ==
On August 11, 2011, Shamansky died from a self-inflicted gunshot wound at his home in Columbus at the age of 84. He had been treated for depression at a psychiatric hospital shortly before his death.

== See also ==
- List of Jewish members of the United States Congress

U.S. House of Representatives
Preceded by Samuel L. Devine	Member of the U.S. House of Representatives from Ohio's 12th congressional district 1981–1983	Succeeded by John Kasich
