= John M. Vorys =

American politician

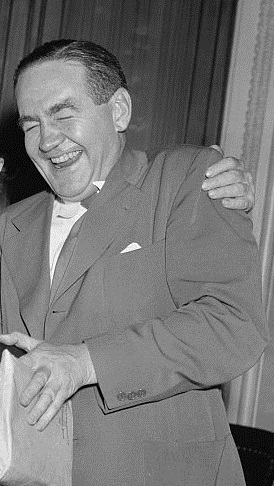
- in Washington, D.C., July 1, 1939

Member of the U.S. House of Representatives from Ohio's 12th district
- In office January 3, 1939 – January 3, 1959
- Preceded by: Arthur P. Lamneck
- Succeeded by: Samuel L. Devine

Member of the Ohio Senate
- In office 1925–1926

Member of the Ohio House of Representatives
- In office 1923–1924

Personal details
- Born: John Martin Vorys; June 16, 1896 Lancaster, Ohio
- Died: August 25, 1968 (aged 72) Columbus, Ohio
- Resting place: Green Lawn Cemetery, Columbus, Ohio
- Party: Republican
- Education: Moritz College of Law; Yale University

John Martin Vorys (June 16, 1896 – August 25, 1968) was a U.S. representative from Ohio. He was a member of the Republican Party.

== Early life ==
Born in Lancaster, Ohio, Vorys attended the public schools in Lancaster and Columbus, Ohio. During the First World War served overseas as a pilot in the famous "Yale Unit" of the United States Naval Air Service, retiring to inactive service in 1919 with rank of lieutenant. He graduated from Yale University in 1918, where he was a member of Skull and Bones, and from Ohio State University Law School at Columbus in 1923. He was a teacher in the College of Yale, Changsha, China, in 1919 and 1920. He served as assistant secretary, American delegation, Conference on Limitation of Armaments, Washington, D.C., in 1921 and 1922. He was admitted to the bar in 1923 and commenced practice in Columbus, Ohio, at the firm founded by his grandfather, Vorys, Sater, Seymour and Pease.

== Political career ==
He served as member of the Ohio House of Representatives in 1923 and 1924, and in the Ohio Senate in 1925 and 1926. He served as director of aeronautics of Ohio in 1929 and 1930.

Vorys was elected as a Republican to the Seventy-sixth and to the nine succeeding Congresses (January 3, 1939 – January 3, 1959). He did not seek reelection in 1958. Vorys voted in favor of the Civil Rights Act of 1957.

A confidential 1943 analysis of the House Foreign Affairs Committee by Isaiah Berlin for the British Foreign Office described Vorys as

The real leader of the Opposition Bloc on the committee. He voted against all major foreign policy measures and was the author of the amendment in June 1939 which provided for a mandatory embargo on the export of arms to belligerent nations. A shrewd and active member likely to prove the most stubborn member of the committee. He constantly presses (and for obvious reasons) for some sort of dollar and cent estimate of the current balance as between Lend-Lease and Reciprocal Aid and proposed the amendments which were later defeated, whereby Congress alone could authorise the final settlement. A Methodist; age 47; a formidable nationalist.

In 1947–8, he served on the Herter Committee.

Vorys served as delegate to the United Nations General Assembly in 1951, and as Regent of the Smithsonian Institution 1949–1959, before resuming the practice of law.

He died in Columbus, Ohio, August 25, 1968, and was interred in Green Lawn Cemetery.

=== Buchenwald Concentration Camp ===
On April 11, 1945, US forces liberated the Buchenwald Concentration Camp which was established in 1937 and caused the death of a least 56,545 people. General Eisenhower left rotting corpses unburied so a visiting group of US legislators could truly understand the horror of the atrocities. This group was visiting Buchenwald to inspect the camp and learn firsthand about the enormity of the Nazi Final Solution and treatment of other prisoners.

The legislators who visited included Alben W. Barkley, Ed Izac, John M. Vorys, Dewey Short, C. Wayland Brooks, and Kenneth S. Wherry along with General Omar N. Bradley and journalists Joseph Pulitzer, Norman Chandler, William I. Nichols and Julius Ochs Adler.

U.S. House of Representatives
Preceded by Arthur P. Lamneck	Member of the U.S. House of Representatives from Ohio's 12th congressional district January 3, 1939 – January 3, 1959	Succeeded by Samuel L. Devine
