= Franklin J. Dickman =

American judge

Franklin Joseph Dickman
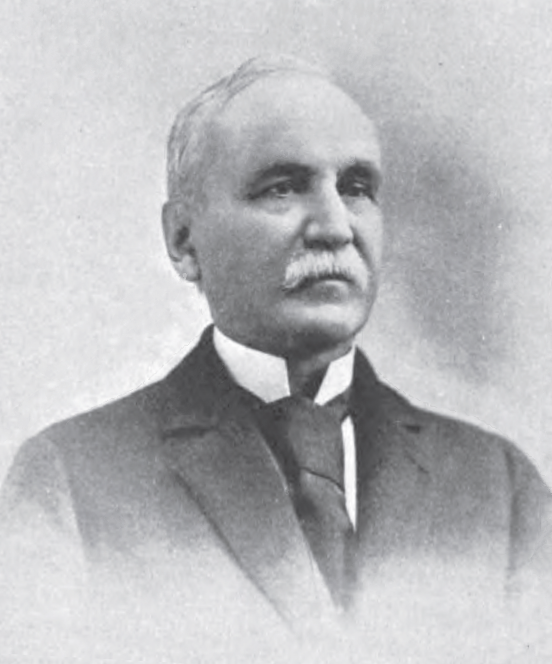

Justice of the Ohio Supreme Court
- In office November 11, 1886 – February 9, 1895
- Appointed by: Joseph B. Foraker
- Preceded by: William Wartenbee Johnson
- Succeeded by: John Allen Shauck

Member of the Ohio House of Representatives from the Cuyahoga County district
- In office January 6, 1862 – January 3, 1864 Serving with Charles H. Babcock; Seneca O. Griswold
- Preceded by: Richard C. Parsons; C. T. Blakeslee
- Succeeded by: Charles H. Babcock; Azariah H. Everett; Charles B. Lockwood

Personal details
- Born: August 28, 1828 Petersburg, Virginia, US
- Died: February 12, 1908 (aged 79) Cleveland, Ohio, US
- Resting place: Lake View Cemetery
- Party: Republican, Democratic
- Spouse: Anna Eliza Neil
- Children: four
- Education: Brown University

Franklin J. Dickman (August 28, 1828 – February 12, 1908) was a Republican politician in the U.S. State of Ohio who was in the Ohio House of Representatives and was an Ohio Supreme Court Judge 1886–1895.

Franklin Dickman was a native of Petersburg, Virginia, born August 28, 1828. At age sixteen he entered Brown University in Providence, Rhode Island, from which he graduated. Studied law under Charles S. Bradley, and opened an office in Providence. He was a candidate for Rhode Island Attorney General as a Democrat in 1857, but lost in the General Election. In 1858, appointed a member of the Board of Visitors of the United States Military Academy, and selected secretary. He authored the widely circulated report of the board. In 1858, he moved to Cleveland, Ohio, and became a Republican during the American Civil War.

In 1861, Dickman represented Cuyahoga County in the Ohio House of Representatives in the 55th General Assembly, (1862–1863), as a Democrat. Married Anna Eliza Neil of Columbus December 24, 1862, who had four children. At the end of his term he formed a partnership with Rufus P. Spalding, which continued until 1875.

In 1867, President Johnson appointed Dickman as United States District Attorney for the Northern district of Ohio, and he resigned in 1869. In 1883 he was appointed on the Supreme Court Commission of Ohio for two years. In 1886, Governor Foraker appointed him to a vacancy on the Ohio Supreme Court. In 1887, he defeated Democrat Virgil P. Kline for the remainder of the term, and he won a full five-year term in 1889 over Democrat Martin Dewey Follett. At the 1894 State Republican Convention, Dickman lost out to John Allen Shauck for the nomination. He died February 12, 1908, at Cleveland. He is buried in Lake View Cemetery

== Notes ==
Legal offices
Preceded by Sherlock J. Andrews	United States Attorney for Northern District of Ohio; 1867–1869	Succeeded by George Willey
