= George Sidney Marshall =

American politician (1869–1956)

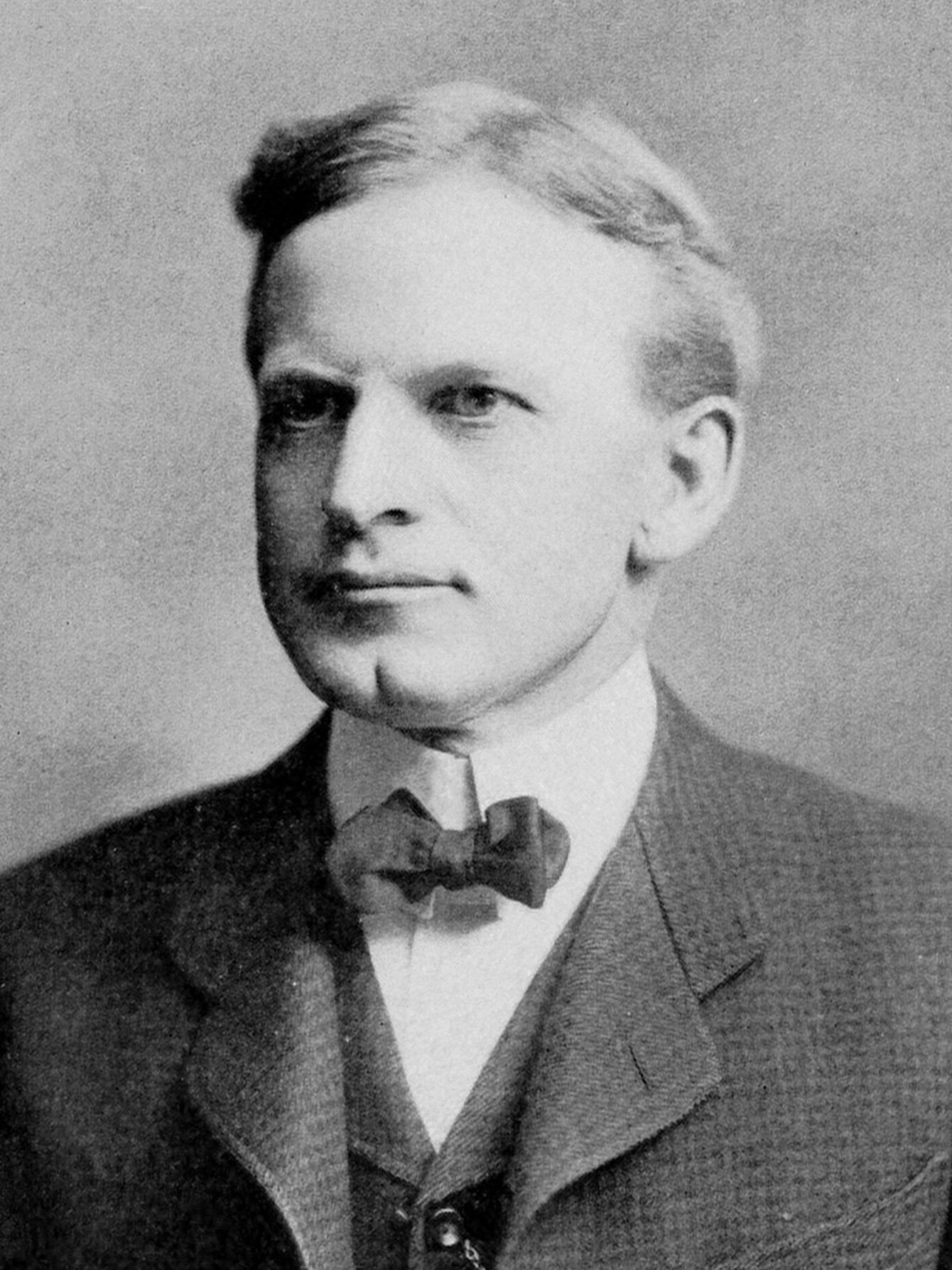

38th Mayor of Columbus, Ohio
- In office 1910–1911
- Preceded by: Charles A. Bond
- Succeeded by: George J. Karb

Personal details
- Born: January 29, 1869 Corning, Ohio, US
- Died: May 20, 1956 (aged 87) Columbus, Ohio, US
- Party: Republican
- Spouse: Alice Badgley
- Education: Ohio State University; Ohio State University College of Law
- Profession: Lawyer

George Sidney Marshall (January 29, 1869 – May 20, 1956) was an American politician, author, and lawyer. He was the 38th mayor of Columbus, Ohio.

== Early life ==
Marshall was born on January 29, 1869, in Corning, Ohio. His parents were Theresa (née Maxwell) and George Marshall.

Marshall was a rural school teacher. He then attended the Ohio State University for his undergraduate and law degree. He passed the bar in 1896.

== Career ==
Marshall practiced law in Columbus, Ohio. In 1898, he was elected to the Columbus City Council. In 1899, he was elected to the position of city attorney.

Marshall was elected the 38th mayor of Columbus, Ohio, and was the 35th person to serve in that office. He was elected in 1909 as a reform candidate and served Columbus for one two-year term. He was defeated in his run for reelection.

After serving as mayor, Marshall returned to private practice in Columbus for 34 years. In 1931, he made an unsuccessful run for mayor. He retired from law in 1946. After retiring, Marshall wrote The History of Music in Columbus Ohio and The Daniel Marshall Family with A Sketch of the Aaron Marshall Family.

== Personal life ==
Marshall married Alice Bedgley on October 14, 1903. They lived at 217 West 11th Avenue and 221 Oakland Park Avenue, both in Columbus, Ohio. Their son, George B. Marshall, became a judge.

Marshall belonged to the Freemasons, the Improved Order of Red Men, the Odd Fellows, the Royal Arcanum, and the Woodman of the World. He was a member of the Church of Christ.

Marshall died on May 20, 1956, aged 87, at his home in Columbus. He was buried in Green Lawn Cemetery in Columbus, Ohio.

Political offices
Preceded by Charles A. Bond	Mayor of Columbus, Ohio; 1910-1911	Succeeded by George J. Karb
