= John Allen Shauck =

American judge

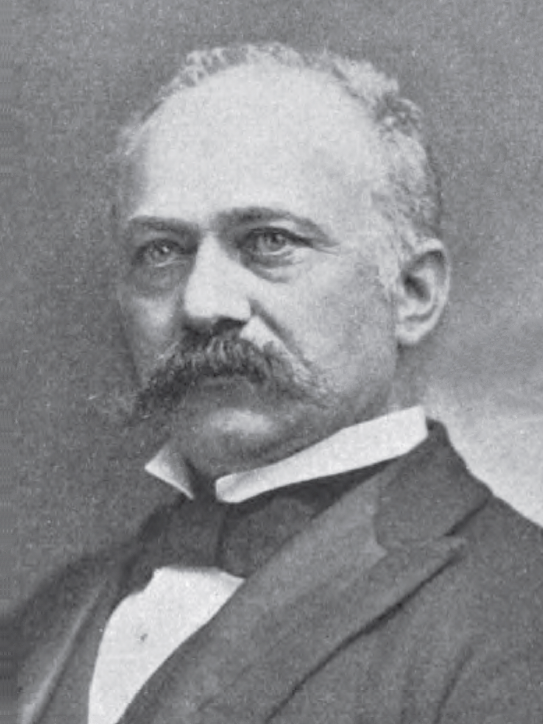

Justice of the Ohio Supreme Court
- In office February 9, 1895 – December 31, 1914
- Preceded by: Franklin J. Dickman
- Succeeded by: Edward S. Matthias

Personal details
- Born: March 26, 1841 Johnsville, Ohio
- Died: January 3, 1918 (aged 76) Columbus, Ohio
- Resting place: Woodland Cemetery, Dayton, Ohio
- Party: Republican
- Spouse: Ada May Phillips
- Children: two
- Education: Otterbein University; University of Michigan Law School

Military service
- Allegiance: United States
- Branch/service: Union Army
- Unit: 136th Ohio Infantry
- Battles/wars: American Civil War

John Allen Shauck (March 26, 1841 – January 3, 1918) was a Republican politician in the U.S. State of Ohio who was an Ohio Supreme Court Judge 1895–1914.

John Allen Shauck was born on a farm near Johnsville, Morrow County, Ohio, to Elah Shauck and Barbara (née Haldeman) Shauck. He attended private and public schools there. In 1864 he graduated from Otterbein University and entered 100 days service in the 136th Ohio Infantry during the American Civil War. In 1867 he graduated from the University of Michigan Law School. He moved to Kansas City, Kansas, for a year, then returned to Ohio, establishing a practice in Dayton in 1868.

Shauck continued a private practice until 1884, when he was elected as a Republican to the Circuit Court Judgeship of the Second Circuit. He was re-elected in 1889.

At the 1894 State Republican Convention, Shauck defeated James Latimer Price and incumbent Franklin J. Dickman for the nomination, and Democrat James D. Ermston in the General election for State Supreme Court Justice. He remained on the court until the end of 1914.

Starting in 1900, he was professor of law at The Ohio State University, and was president of the Ohio State Bar Association in 1917.

He died January 3, 1918, at Columbus. His funeral was at Trinity Episcopal Church, with burial at Woodland Cemetery, Dayton, Ohio.

Shauck married Ada May Phillips on June 1, 1876, in Centralia, Illinois. They had two children.

== Notes ==
Legal offices
| Preceded by Franklin J. Dickman | Associate Justice of the Ohio Supreme Court; 1895–1914 | Succeeded by Edward S. Matthias |
