= Emmett Tompkins =

American politician

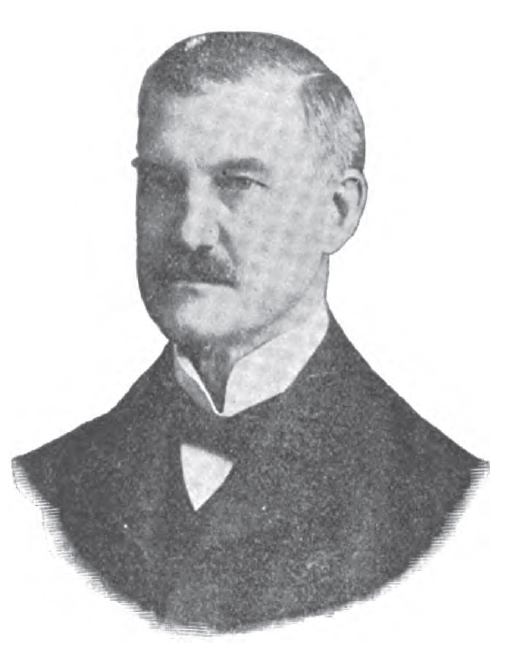

Member of the U.S. House of Representatives from Ohio's 12th district
- In office March 4, 1901 – March 3, 1903
- Preceded by: John J. Lentz
- Succeeded by: De Witt C. Badger

Member of the Ohio House of Representatives from the Athens County district
- In office January 4, 1886 – January 5, 1890
- Preceded by: Isaac P. Primrose
- Succeeded by: William L. Keissinger

Personal details
- Born: September 1, 1853 McConnelsville, Ohio
- Died: December 18, 1917 (aged 64) Columbus, Ohio
- Party: Republican
- Education: Ohio University

Emmett Tompkins (September 1, 1853 – December 18, 1917) was an American lawyer and politician who served one term as a U.S. representative from Ohio from 1901 to 1903. He was the son of Congressman Cydnor Bailey Tompkins.

== Early life and education ==
Born in McConnelsville, Morgan County, Ohio, Tompkins moved to Athens County, Ohio, in 1865. He attended the public schools and Ohio University at Athens. He studied law.

== Career ==
He was admitted to the bar in 1875 and commenced practice in Athens, Ohio. City solicitor in 1876 and 1877. He served as mayor of Athens from 1877 to 1879, and as prosecuting attorney of Athens County in 1879.

=== Early political activities ===
He served as delegate to the Republican State conventions in 1879, 1881, and 1883. He served as member of the Ohio House of Representatives 1886-1890. He moved to Columbus, Ohio, in 1889. He served as member of the board of trustees of Ohio University.

He lost election for Mayor of Columbus, Ohio the spring of 1897 to Democrat Samuel Luccock Black.

== Congress ==
Tompkins was elected as a Republican to the Fifty-seventh Congress (March 4, 1901 – March 3, 1903).

== Later career and death ==
He resumed the practice of law in Columbus, Ohio. He was appointed trustee of Ohio University in 1908. He died in Columbus, Ohio, December 18, 1917. He remains were cremated in Cincinnati, Ohio, and the ashes returned to his home in Columbus, Ohio.

U.S. House of Representatives
Preceded by John J. Lentz	Member of the U.S. House of Representatives from Ohio's 12th congressional district March 4, 1901 – March 3, 1903	Succeeded by De Witt C. Badger
