= Clement Laird Brumbaugh =

American educator and politician (1863–1921)

Clement L. Brumbaugh
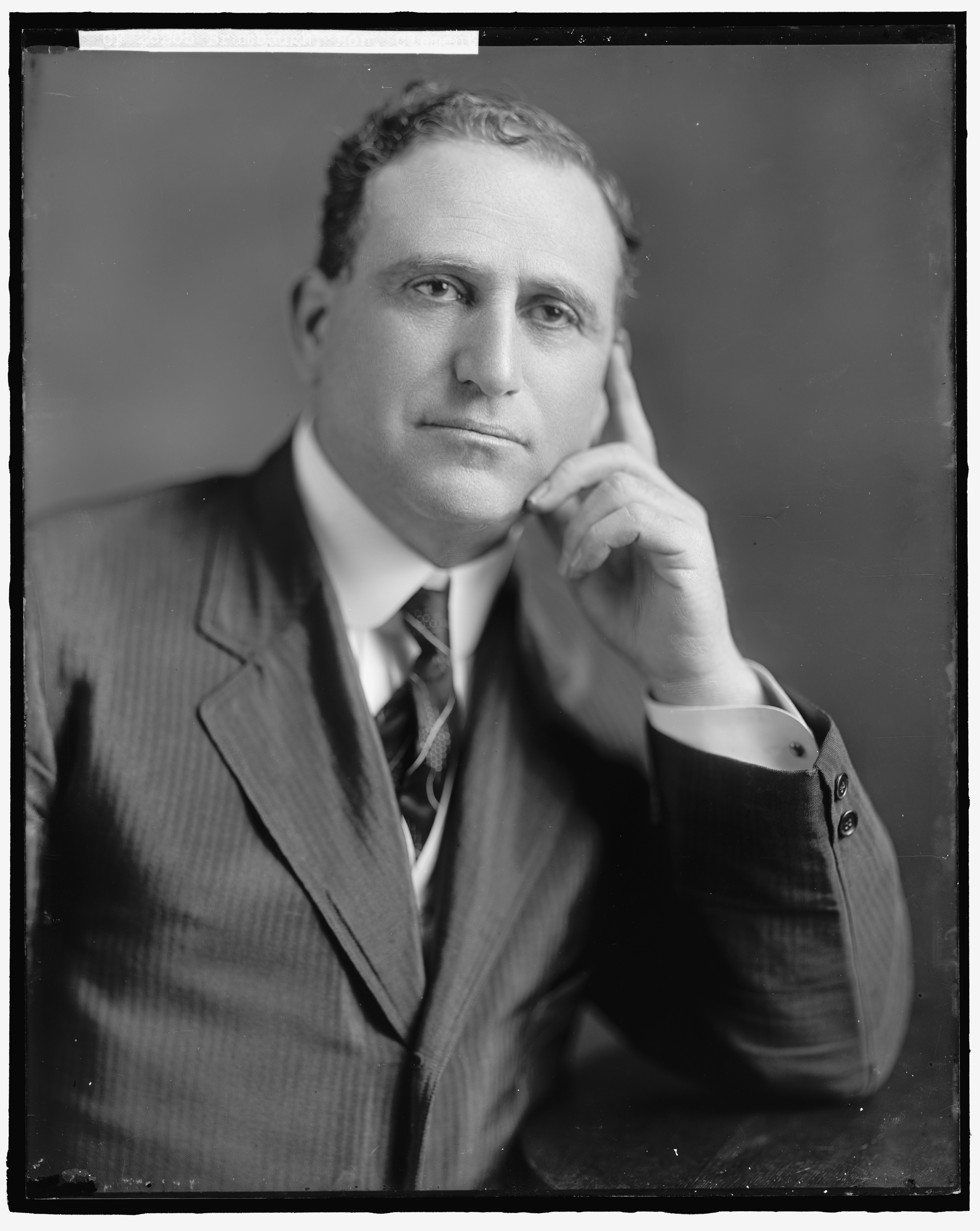

Member of the U.S. House of Representatives from Ohio's 12th district
- In office March 4, 1913 – March 3, 1921
- Preceded by: Edward L. Taylor Jr.
- Succeeded by: John C. Speaks

Member of the Ohio House of Representatives from the Darke County district
- In office January 1, 1900 – January 3, 1904
- Preceded by: Charles W. Ludwick
- Succeeded by: A. H. Judy

Personal details
- Born: Clement Laird Brumbaugh; February 28, 1863 Darke County, Ohio
- Died: September 28, 1921 (aged 58) Columbus, Ohio
- Resting place: Greenville Union Cemetery in Greenville, Ohio
- Party: Democratic
- Education: National Normal University; Ohio Wesleyan University; Harvard University

Clement Laird Brumbaugh (February 28, 1863 – September 28, 1921) was an American educator and politician who served as a U.S. representative from Ohio for four terms from 1913 to 1921.

== Early life and education ==
Born on a farm near Pikeville, in Darke County, Ohio, Brumbaugh attended the district schools and Greenville High School in Greenville, Ohio. He taught school, worked on a farm, and tutored. He was graduated from National Normal University, Lebanon, Ohio, in 1887.

He was related to the infamous World War I aviator and barnstormer, Dr. David Brumbaugh.

He founded and conducted the Van Buren Academy from 1887 to 1891.

He attended Ohio Wesleyan University, Delaware, Ohio from 1891 to 1893. He graduated from Harvard University in 1894.

== Early career ==
After this Brumbaugh taught school in Washington, D.C. from 1894 to 1896. Next he served as Superintendent of schools in Greenville, Ohio from 1896 to 1900.

He studied law and was admitted to the bar in 1900 and commenced practice in Columbus, Ohio.

He served as member of the Ohio House of Representatives from 1900 to 1904, eventually serving as minority leader.

== Congress ==
Brumbaugh was elected as a Democrat to the Sixty-third and to the three succeeding Congresses (March 4, 1913 – March 3, 1921). He served as chairman of the Committee on Railways and Canals (Sixty-fifth Congress). He was not a candidate for renomination in 1920.

== Retirement and death ==
He lived in retirement in Columbus, Ohio, until his death there on September 28, 1921. He was interred in Greenville Union Cemetery in Greenville, Ohio.

== Sources ==
- United States Congress. "Clement Laird Brumbaugh (id: B000975)". Biographical Directory of the United States Congress.

U.S. House of Representatives
Preceded by Edward L. Taylor Jr.	Member of the U.S. House of Representatives from Ohio's 12th congressional district March 4, 1913 – March 3, 1921	Succeeded by John C. Speaks
