= Stephanie L. Haines =

American judge (born 1969)

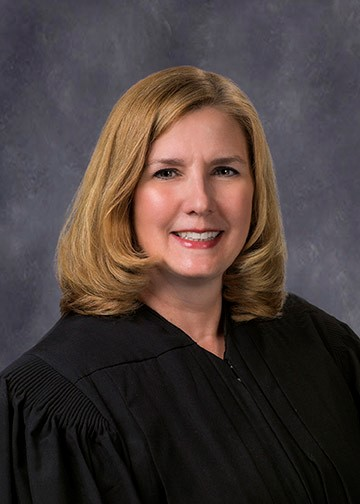

Judge of the United States District Court for the Western District of Pennsylvania
- Incumbent
- Assumed office September 30, 2019
- Appointed by: Donald Trump
- Preceded by: David S. Cercone

Personal details
- Born: Stephanie Lou Haines; 1969 (age 56–57) Johnstown, Pennsylvania, U.S.
- Education: Juniata College (BA); Ohio Northern University (JD)

Military service
- Allegiance: United States
- Branch/service: United States Army (1996–2002); United States Army Reserve (2002–2005); West Virginia Air National Guard (2005–2019)
- Rank: Colonel
- Unit: 101st Airborne Division; United States Army Judge Advocate General's Corps; 130th Airlift Wing; United States Air Force Judge Advocate General's Corps
- Awards: See list: Air Force Outstanding Unit Award Parachutist Badge Army Air Assault Badge Meritorious Service Medal (with Bronze Oak Leaf Cluster) Army Commendation Medal Air Force Commendation Medal Army Achievement Medal National Defense Service Medal Global War on Terrorism Service Medal Armed Forces Reserve Medal Army Service Ribbon West Virginia Service Ribbon

Stephanie Lou Haines (born 1969) is a United States district judge of the United States District Court for the Western District of Pennsylvania.

== Education ==
Haines received her Bachelor of Arts from Juniata College and her Juris Doctor from Ohio Northern University College of Law.

== Legal career and military service ==
After graduating, she served as a law clerk for Judge Eugene E. Fike II of the Somerset County Court of Common Pleas. She served as a captain in the United States Army Judge Advocate General's Corps, continued her service as a major in the U.S. Army Reserve, and served as a colonel in the West Virginia Air National Guard as a reserve member of the United States Air Force Judge Advocate General's Corps until 2019. She previously served as an Assistant United States Attorney in the U.S. Attorney's Office for the Southern District of West Virginia, as well as the U.S. Attorney's Office for the Western District of Pennsylvania. She was the sole prosecutor in the Johnstown, Pennsylvania, branch office and handles a wide variety of federal criminal matters.

== Federal judicial service ==
On March 1, 2019, President Donald Trump announced his intent to nominate Haines to serve as a United States district judge for the United States District Court for the Western District of Pennsylvania. On March 5, 2019, her nomination was sent to the Senate. President Trump nominated Haines to the seat vacated by Judge David S. Cercone, who assumed senior status on November 24, 2017. On April 10, 2019, a hearing on her nomination was held before the Senate Judiciary Committee. On May 9, 2019, her nomination was reported out of committee by a 21–1 vote. On July 30, 2019, the United States Senate invoked cloture on her nomination by a 87–1 vote. On September 11, 2019, her nomination was confirmed by a 94–0 vote. She received her judicial commission on September 30, 2019.

On May 13, 2025, Haines allowed the Trump administration to proceed with using the wartime Alien Enemies Act to deport a Venezuelan man, whom the administration accused of being a member of Tren de Aragua, but found that the administration had not yet provided sufficient due process.

Legal offices
Preceded by David S. Cercone	Judge of the United States District Court for the Western District of Pennsylvania; 2019–present	Incumbent
