= John J. Lentz =

American lawyer and politician

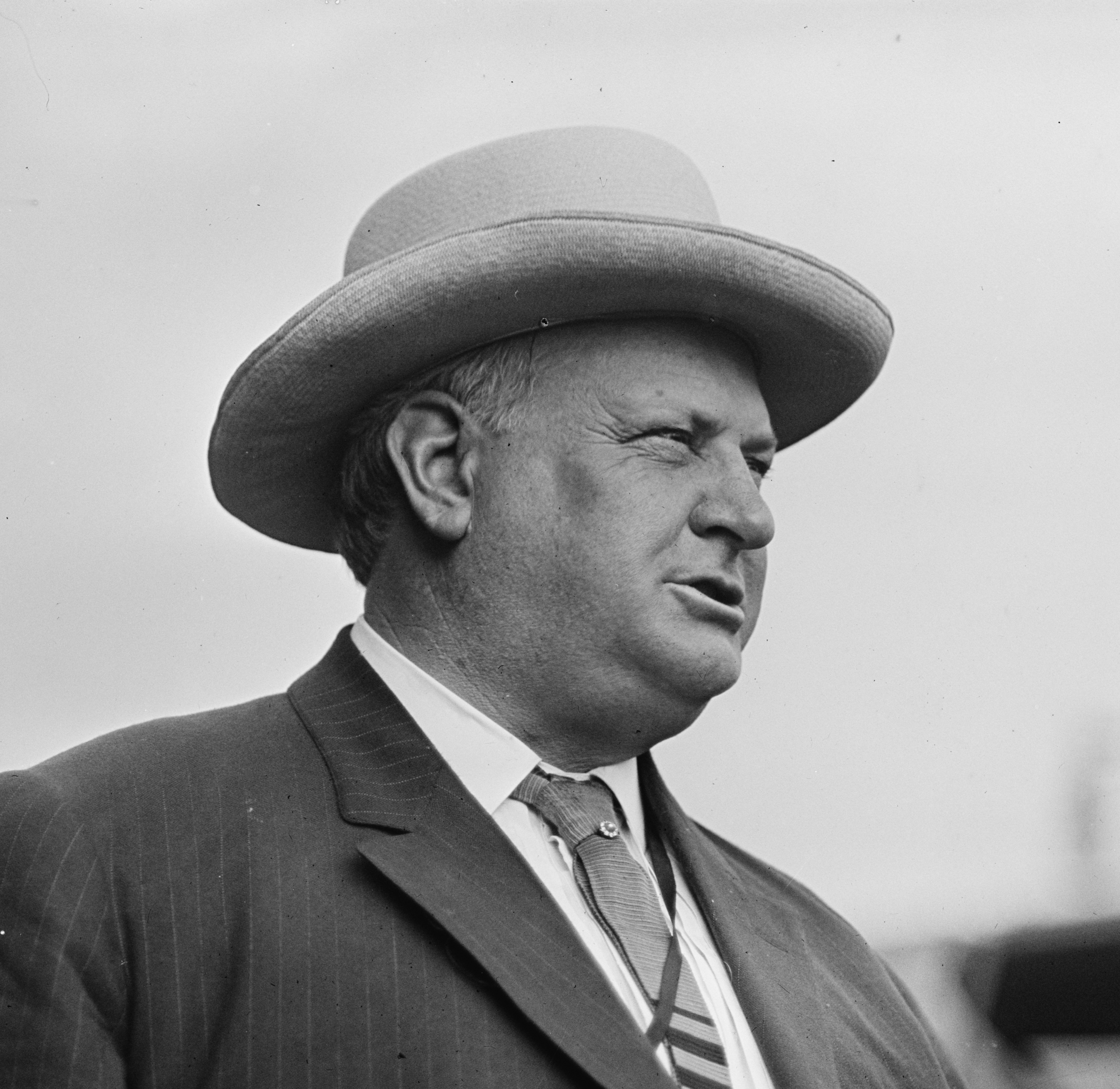

Member of the U.S. House of Representatives from Ohio's 12th district
- In office March 4, 1897 – March 3, 1901
- Preceded by: David K. Watson
- Succeeded by: Emmett Tompkins

Personal details
- Born: John Jacob Lentz; January 27, 1856 Belmont County, Ohio, U.S.
- Died: July 27, 1931 (aged 75) Columbus, Ohio, U.S.
- Resting place: Green Lawn Cemetery; Columbus, Ohio, U.S.
- Party: Democratic
- Education: National Normal University; University of Wooster; University of Michigan; Columbia Law School

John Jacob Lentz (January 27, 1856 – July 27, 1931) was an American lawyer and politician who served as a U.S. representative from Ohio for two terms from 1897 to 1901.

== Early life and career ==
Born near St. Clairsville, Ohio, Lentz attended the common schools and the St. Clairsville High School. He was a school teacher for four years. He graduated from the National Normal University, Lebanon, Ohio, in 1877 and then attended the University of Wooster in 1877 and 1878. He graduated from the University of Michigan at Ann Arbor in 1882 and from Columbia Law School, New York City, in 1883.

He was admitted to the bar in Columbus, Ohio, in October 1883 and practiced. He was law partner with George K. Nash from 1887 until Nash's death in 1904.

He was the founder of the American Insurance Union in 1894 and was its president continuously from then until his death. He was a trustee of Ohio University at Athens.

== Congress ==
Lentz was elected as a Democrat to the Fifty-fifth and Fifty-sixth Congresses (March 4, 1897 – March 3, 1901). He was an unsuccessful candidate for re-election in 1900 to the Fifty-seventh Congress.

== Later career ==
He served as delegate to the Democratic National Convention in 1908. He participated in campaigns in many States in support of the Eighteenth and Nineteenth amendments to the United States Constitution.

He retired from his law practice in 1915 and engaged in the insurance business. Lentz was a member of the Board of Governors of the Loyal Order of Moose.

== Death ==
He died in Columbus, Ohio, on July 27, 1931. He was interred in Green Lawn Cemetery.

John Lentz was too honest to succeed in politics.

— Eugene V. Debs, 1923

== See also ==
- American Insurance Union Citadel

== Sources ==
- United States Congress. "John J. Lentz (id: L000244)". Biographical Directory of the United States Congress.

U.S. House of Representatives
Preceded by David K. Watson	Member of the U.S. House of Representatives from Ohio's 12th congressional district March 4, 1897 – March 3, 1901	Succeeded by Emmett Tompkins
