= Pettit College of Law =

Ohio Northern University law school

Ohio Northern University Pettit College of Law
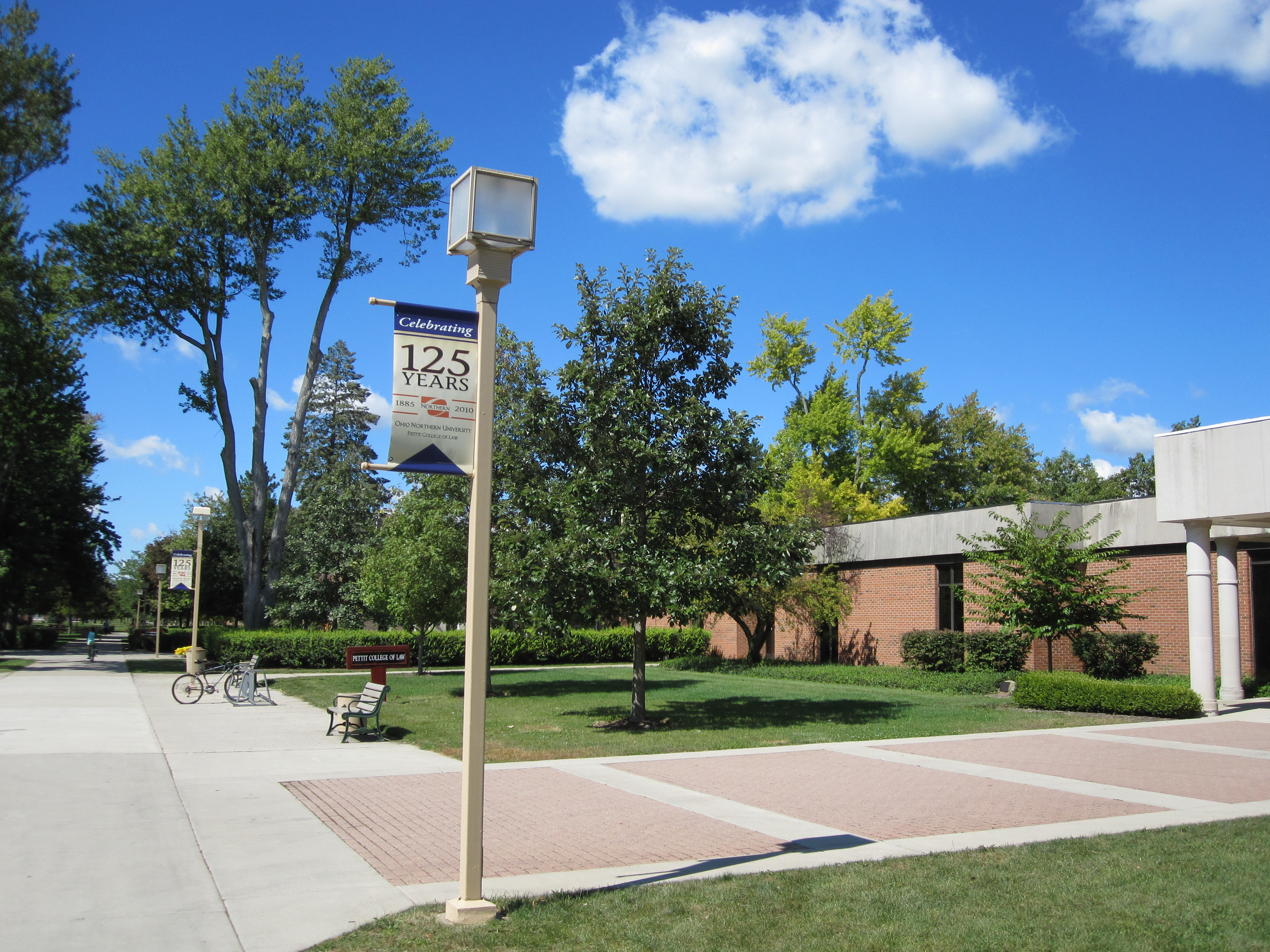
- Parent school: Ohio Northern University
- Established: 1885
- School type: Private
- Dean: Charles H. Rose III
- Location: Ada, Ohio, USA; 40°46′02″N 83°49′31″W
- Enrollment: 178 (fall 2022)
- Faculty: 18 FT, 5 PT
- USNWR ranking: 178-195 (2025)
- Bar pass rate: 100% (July 2019)
- Website: law.onu.edu

The Ohio Northern University Pettit College of Law (ONU Law) is the law school of Ohio Northern University. Located in Ada, Ohio, it is the second oldest law school in Ohio, having been founded in 1885. The college is centered in Tilton Hall, which houses all law classes and the Taggart Law Library. The College of Law is located on the east-northeast side of the ONU campus.

== History ==
Founded in 1885, the Ohio Northern University Pettit College of Law is the second oldest of the nine Ohio law schools and a founding member of the Ohio League of Law Schools. It was named in honor of Claude W. Pettit, a judge and former dean of the college. ONU Law has been fully accredited by the American Bar Association since 1948 and a member of the Association of American Law Schools since 1965.

== Academics ==
Entrance to Tilton Hall at night.

The ONU Law is accredited by the American Bar Association and is a member of the Association of American Law Schools. In 2023, the school was ranked 146 by U.S. News & World Report.

=== Admissions ===
For the class entering in 2022, ONU Law accepted 59.43% of applicants and 24.78% of those accepted enrolled with the average enrollee having a 148 LSAT score and 3.42 undergraduate GPA.

=== Curriculum ===
ONU Law students can choose from nine specialized tracks, 12 guaranteed clinical and externship placements and more than 100+ course options while also expanding their experience by studying abroad, participating in Law Review, accepting research and teaching assistantships, participating in pro bono programs or taking an active role in Moot Court. ONU Law is regarded for its ability to blend legal theory with practical training.

=== Bar passage rate ===
ONU Law's bar passage rate for first-time takers of the July 2019 Ohio Bar Examination was 100%, while its bar passage rate for first-time takers in any jurisdiction in 2019 was 84.44%.

== Employment ==
According to ONU Law's official ABA-required disclosures, 86% of the 2021 graduating class was employed in full-time professional positions 10 months after graduation with 74% in bar passage required and 7% in JD advantage positions. JD required positions were in various size law firms, most being in 1 –10 attorney firms, two graduates obtained local and state judicial clerkships, and 33% of graduates obtained public interest, government, higher education, or business employment.

== Costs and grants ==
The cost of tuition at ONU Law for the 2022–23 academic year was $31,940 plus $990 in fees, while the estimate for living expenses for an academic year while living on campus was $19,290.00. As of 2022, ONU had provided 159 of its students with grants, and the average grant was $22,500.

== Notable alumni ==
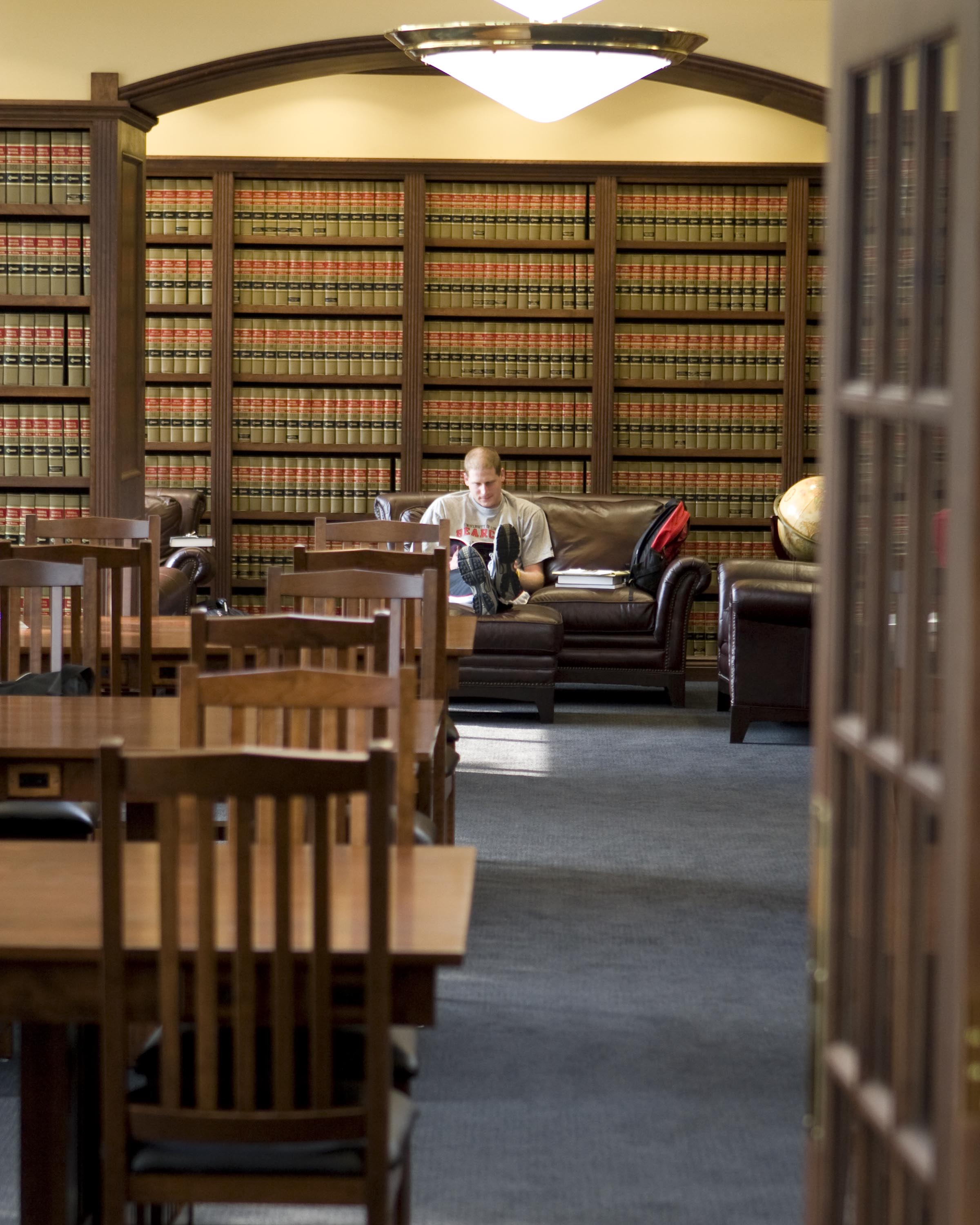
ONU Law student studying in Taggart Law Library.

ONU Law alumni have gone on to become federal and state judges in 15 states, and to serve in the United States Senate and a presidential cabinet. The Governor of Ohio is an alumnus. Some notable alumni include:

- Warren Ballentine (b. 1973), Class of 2001, motivational speaker, and radio talk show host.
- Benjamin Brafman (b. 1948), Class of 1974; criminal defense attorney, attorney for former International Monetary Fund Head Dominique Strauss-Kahn and Harvey Weinstein.
- William J. Brown (b. 1940), youngest Attorney General of Ohio.
- Anthony J. Celebrezze (1910–1998), Judge of the U.S. Court of Appeals for the Sixth Circuit; Secretary of U.S. Department of Health, Education and Welfare in the Kennedy and Johnson Administrations.
- Ralph D. Cole (1873–1932), U.S. Representative from Ohio, brother of Raymond Clinton Cole.
- Raymond Clinton Cole (1870–1957), Republican politician who became a U.S. Representative from Ohio and was the brother of Ralph Cole.
- Mike Crites (b. 1948), Republican politician and former United States Attorney for the Southern District of Ohio.
- Robert R. Cupp (b. 1950), Justice, Supreme Court of Ohio; Judge, Ohio Court of Appeals, 3rd Appellate District; State Senate, Ohio; Speaker, Ohio House.
- Michael DeWine (b. 1947), U.S. Senator, Ohio from 1995 to 2007; former Attorney General of the State of Ohio. Governor of State of Ohio.
- Jane M. Earll (b. 1958), Republican member of the Pennsylvania State Senate who has represented the 49th District since 1997.
- James Espaldon (b. 1956), Guamanian politician and 2010 candidate for Lieutenant Governor of Guam.
- Simeon D. Fess (1861–1936), class of 1894; dean of ONU Law from 1896 to 1900; served as a U.S. Representative from Ohio and in the U.S. Senate from Ohio for twelve years.
- Gregory L. Frost (b. 1949), Judge, U.S. District Court, Southern District of Ohio.
- Stephanie L. Haines, (b.1969), U.S. Federal Judge, Western District of Pennsylvania
- Francey Hakes (b.1973), class of 1996; Asst. U.S. Attorney, first United States National Coordinator for Child Exploitation Prevention and Interdiction.
- Robert Franklin Jones (1907–1968), class of 1929; a U.S. Representative from Ohio.
- Edward S. Matthias, justice of the Supreme Court of Ohio
- Arthur W. Overmyer (1879–1952), a U.S. Representative from Ohio, and a judge on the Ohio Court of Appeals.
- Homer A. Ramey (1891–1960), a U.S. Representative from Ohio.
- Tom Reed (b. 1971); former U.S. Representative from New York; former mayor of Corning, New York. Co Chair of Problem Solvers Caucus in U.S. Congress.
- Scott Rolle (b. 1961), class of 1987; State's Attorney for Frederick County, Maryland from 1995 to 2007. Judge of the Circuit Court for Frederick County, Maryland 2014–present. LTC, United States Army Reserve, 2001–present
- Jason M. Walsh, class of 1996; District Attorney of Washington County, Pennsylvania.
- Christopher Wilkes, class of 1982, Judge, West Virginia Circuit Court

== Ohio Northern University Law Review ==
Among United States law journals as of 2023, it was ranked #153 by a professor at the University of Oregon School of Journalism and Communication.
