= Saint Francis University =

Catholic university in Loretto, Pennsylvania, USA

- Former name: Saint Francis College (1847–2001)
- Type: Private university
- Established: 1847; 179 years ago
- Religious affiliation: Catholic Church
- Endowment: $67.3 million (2025)
- President: Malachi Van Tassell
- Undergraduates: 1,562
- Postgraduates: 396
- Location: Loretto, Pennsylvania, United States; 40°30′15″N 78°38′15″W
- Campus: Rural, 600 acres (243 ha)
- Colors: Red and White
- Nickname: Red Wolves
- Sporting affiliations: NCAA Division III – PAC CWPA
- Website: www.francis.edu

Saint Francis University (SFU) is a private Catholic university in Loretto, Pennsylvania, United States. It was founded in 1847 and conducted under the tradition of the Franciscan Friars of the Third Order Regular. The university is situated on 600 acres (243 ha) in the forests and farmland of Loretto.

== History ==
Saint Francis was established in 1847 by six Franciscan teaching Brothers from Mountbellew, Ireland. They had been given land in Loretto by Michael O'Connor, the first Bishop of Pittsburgh, to establish a school. Saint Francis Academy opened on September 2, 1850. Originally an academy, Saint Francis became popularly known as Saint Francis College as early as 1860, although that designation was not formally adopted by law until 1911. The university was one of the first Catholic universities in the United States and the first Franciscan college in the nation. Although it originally only admitted males, it became one of the first Catholic Universities to become co-educational. amending its charter in 1948. Loretto is the site of the first English-language Roman Catholic settlement established west of the Allegheny Front, in what is now the United States, by Demetrius Augustine Gallitzin in 1799.

In 2000, Saint Francis College was approved to become a university by the Commonwealth of Pennsylvania and was formally renamed "Saint Francis University" on January 1, 2001.

== Academics ==
Saint Francis University enrolls approximately 1,658 undergraduate students (of whom 1,392 are traditional students and 266 are continuing education students) and 527 graduate students. The university offers 25 undergraduate majors and 7 graduate fields of study (including Physical Therapy, in which the university awards a doctorate) to its students. The university maintains an average graduation rate of 70.3%.

== Campus ==
The main building for the Southern Alleghenies Museum of Art, which also has a number of smaller facilities across the local region, is located on campus. Also on the campus are The DiSepio Institute for Rural Health and Wellness, Center for Watershed Research & Service, and The Institute for Contemporary Franciscan Life.

Immergrün Golf Course is a semi-private, nine-hole, regulation-length 3,234-yard, par-36 course on rye grass located on the campus of Saint Francis University at 105 Saint Elizabeth Street. Immergrün has not been altered since Donald Ross built it for the steel magnate Charles M. Schwab in 1917.

Saint Francis University campus
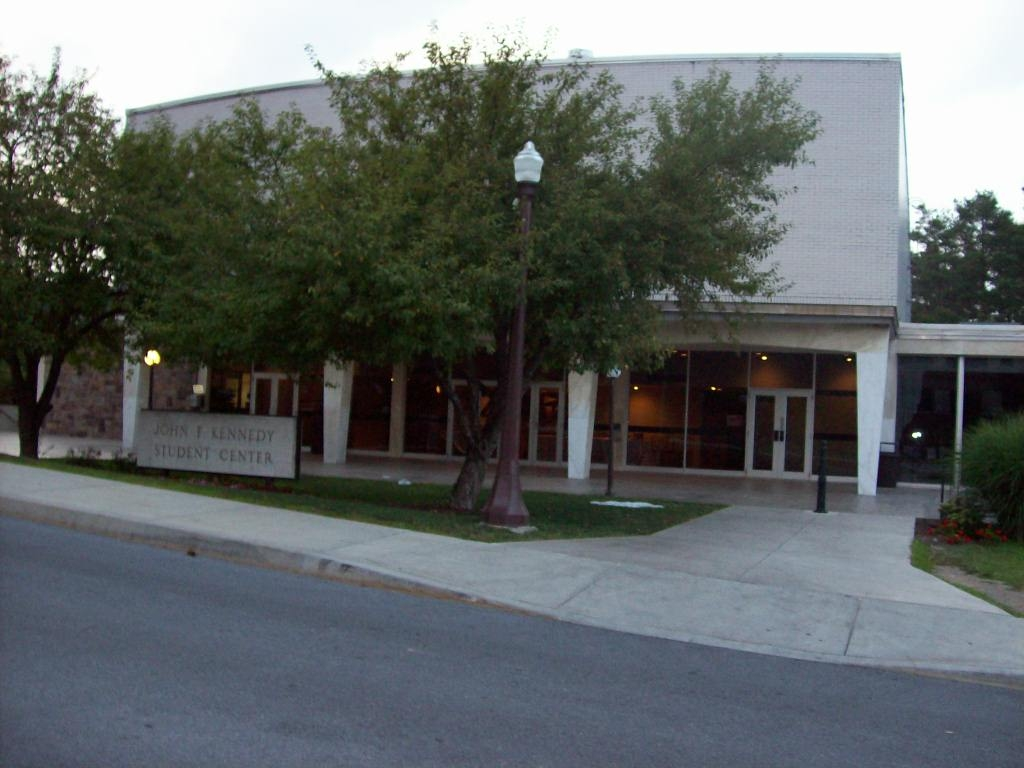
The John F. Kennedy Center

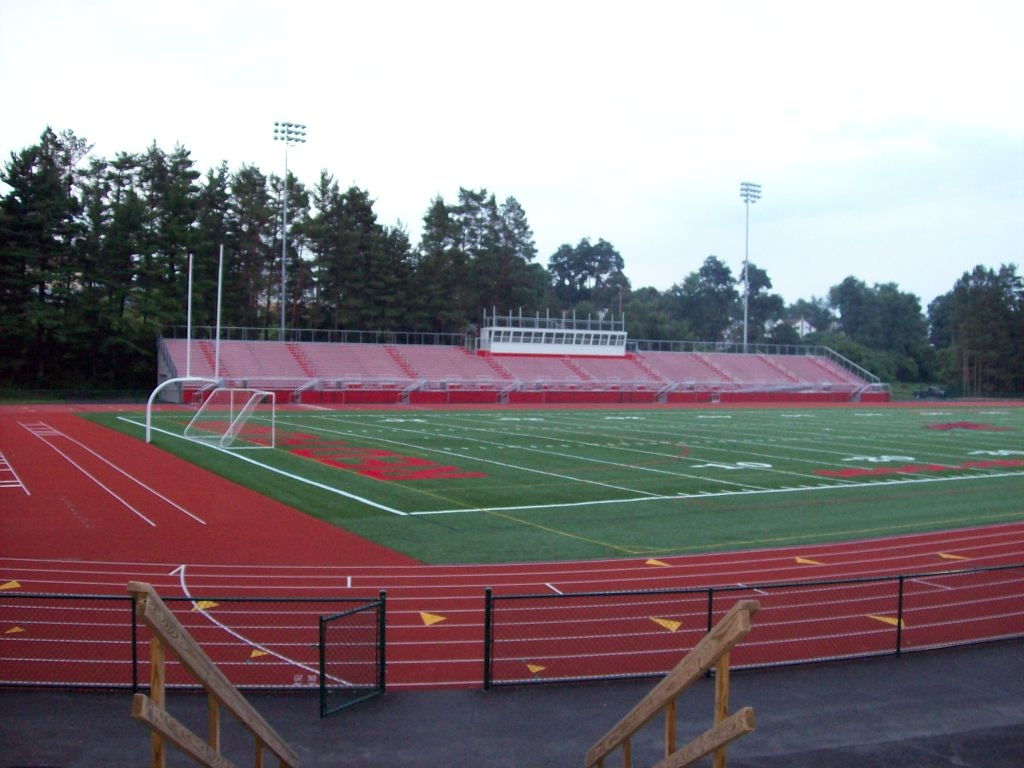
DeGol Field

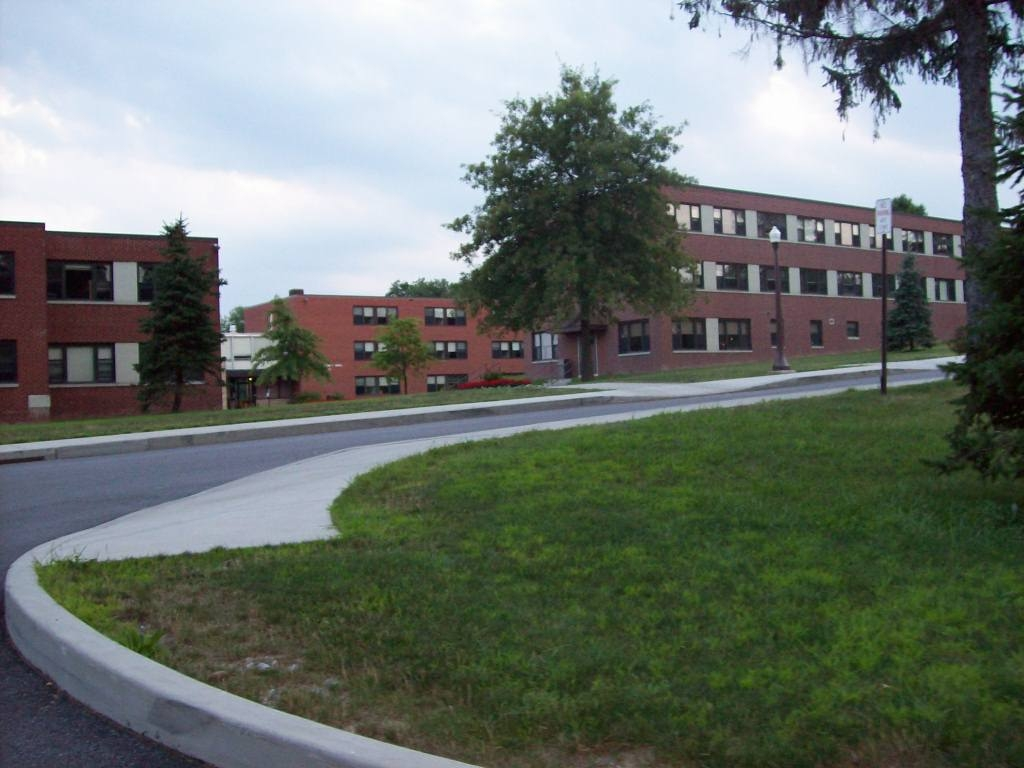
North Campus

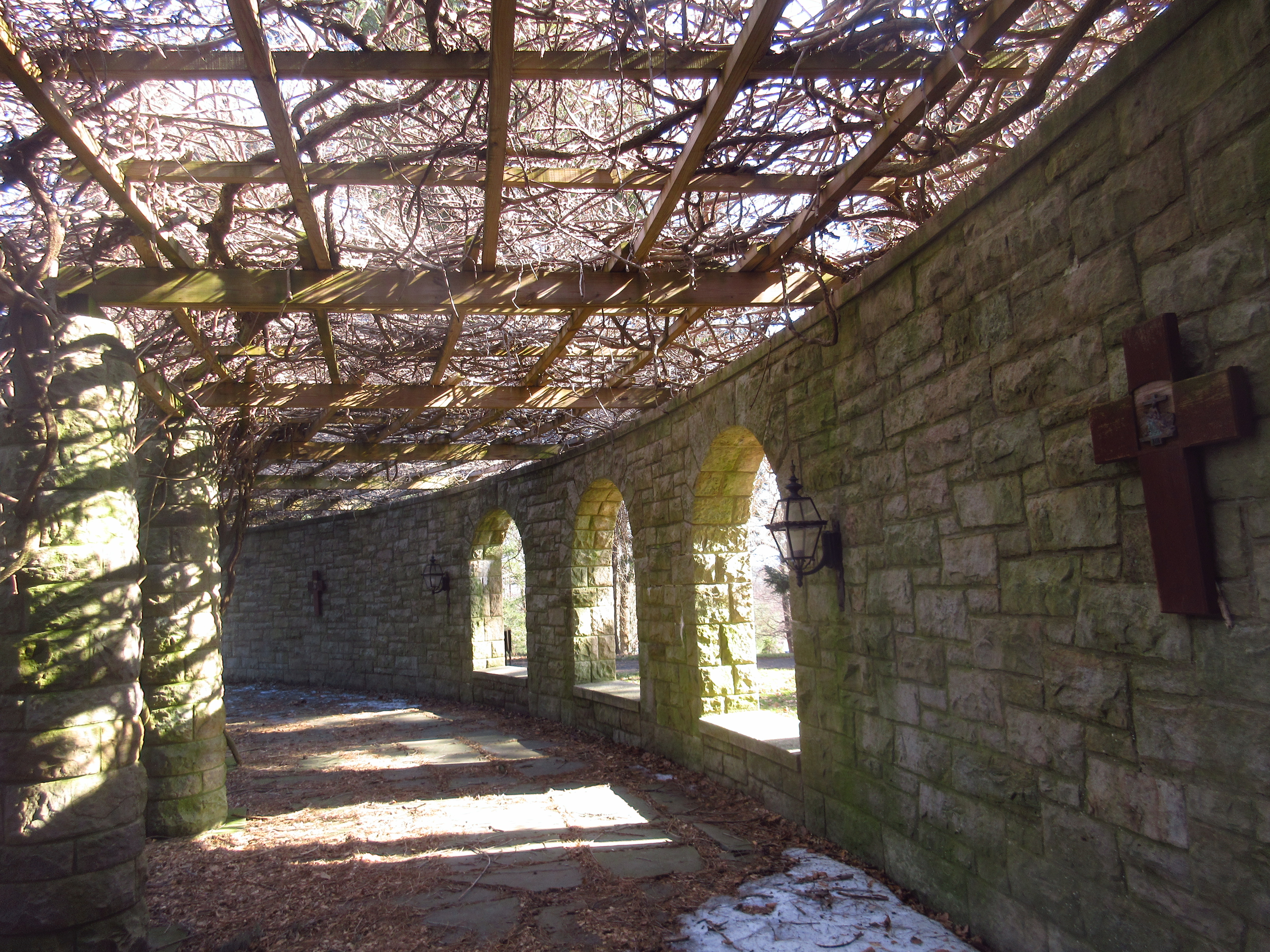
Mt. Assisi Gardens, which are located on the former Schwab Estate.

== Athletics ==
Saint Francis's NCAA Division III program includes 22 varsity teams, with 9 sports for men and 13 for women. The school is a member of the Presidents' Athletic Conference (PAC).

On March 25, 2025, Saint Francis announced that it would move from the NCAA Division I Northeast Conference (now officially NEC) to Division III beginning with the 2026–27 athletic year.

On June 3, 2026, Saint Francis made the announcement that it would change the nickname of its athletic teams to the Red Wolves for the 2026-27 athletic year to coincide with the university's move to Division III.

== Notable alumni ==
- Jeff Bower – professional basketball manager and college basketball coach.
- Captain Paul Boyton (1848–1924) - author, inventor, and member of the International Swimming Hall of Fame.
- James Casorio (Master's Degree in 1995) – Representative Pennsylvania House of Representatives 1997–2010.
- Dominic Joseph Mike Ryba (1903–1971) – professional baseball player.
- Calvin Fowler (1940–2013) – professional and Olympic basketball player.
- Mike Iuzzolino – professional basketball player and coach.
- Lorenzo Jerome - professional football player.
- Nick Kolarac – professional soccer player.
- Rob Krimmel – college basketball coach.
- John Michael Kudrick – Eastern Catholic prelate and the bishop of Parma for the Byzantines from 2002 until his resignation in 2016.
- Scott Layden – professional basketball manager and team owner.
- George Magulick - professional football player.
- Brennan Manning (christened Richard Francis Xavier Manning) (1934–2013) – Christian author (e. g., The Ragamuffin Gospel), friar, priest and speaker.
- John A. Nagy – author on espionage and mutinies of the American Revolution.
- John Naioti (1921–1990) – professional football player.
- Steve Oroho – Republican Party politician, who has served since January 2008 in the New Jersey Senate, where he represents the 24th Legislative District.
- Tadeusz Piotrowski – author and sociologist.
- Kevin Porter – professional basketball player.
- Louis Schmitt Jr. (b. 1962 – former Member of the Pennsylvania House of Representatives (2018-2025) and current Judge of the Court of Common Pleas for the 24th Judicial District (Blair County, Pennsylvania).
- Charles M. Schwab (1862–1939) – industrialist and member of the American Metal Market Steel Hall of Fame.
- Brian Sell – Distance runner and member of USA 2008 Olympic men's marathon team.
- Maurice Stokes (1933–1970) – professional basketball player; the NBA Twyman–Stokes Teammate of the Year Award is named in his honor.
- Thomas Joseph Tobin – Retired bishop of Diocese of Providence, Rhode Island.
- Norm Van Lier (1947–2009) – "Stormin' Norman," professional basketball player.
- Jason M. Walsh - District Attorney of Washington County, Pennsylvania.
- Justin Walsh - Court of Common Pleas Judge in Westmoreland County, Pennsylvania.
