= Samuel L. Devine =

American politician (1915–1997)

Sam Devine
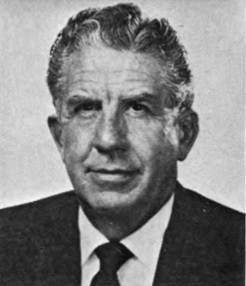
- Devine in 1973

Chair of the House Republican Conference
- In office June 20, 1979 – January 3, 1981
- Leader: John Rhodes
- Preceded by: John B. Anderson
- Succeeded by: Jack Kemp

Vice Chair of the House Republican Conference
- In office September 16, 1971 – June 20, 1979
- Leader: John Rhodes
- Preceded by: Robert Stafford
- Succeeded by: Jack Edwards

Member of the U.S. House of Representatives from Ohio's 12th district
- In office January 3, 1959 – January 3, 1981
- Preceded by: John Vorys
- Succeeded by: Bob Shamansky

Personal details
- Born: Samuel Leeper Devine; December 21, 1915 South Bend, Indiana, U.S.
- Died: June 27, 1997 (aged 81) Upper Arlington, Ohio, U.S.
- Party: Republican
- Children: Carol
- Education: Colgate University (attended); Ohio State University (BA); University of Notre Dame (LLB)

Samuel Leeper Devine (December 21, 1915 – June 27, 1997) was an American politician an member of the Republican Party who served in the United States House of Representatives as Representative of the 12th congressional district of Ohio from January 3, 1959, until January 3, 1981; he left office after being defeated by Bob Shamansky, a Democrat, who then lost the seat after a single term to Republican John Kasich. During the 96th Congress, Devine was the Chairman of the House Republican Conference.

== Early life ==
Samuel L. Devine was born in South Bend, Indiana, on December 21, 1915, and his family moved to Columbus, Ohio, in 1920. He attended Upper Arlington High School. Devine attended Colgate University from 1933 to 1934 and the Ohio State University from 1934 to 1937. After graduating from OSU, Devine went to law school at the University of Notre Dame (located in the city of his birth) and received an LL.B. and J.D. in 1940.

== Career ==
Devine was admitted to the bar in 1940 and began private legal practice in Columbus, but in 1940 was appointed a special agent of the Federal Bureau of Investigation. He resigned from the Bureau in October 1945 and resumed private practice in Columbus.

Devine embarked on a political career in 1950 and was elected to the Ohio House of Representatives, where he served from 1951 to 1955. Devine was chairman of the Ohio Un-American Activities Committee, a joint committee of the Ohio House and the Senate modelled on the federal House Un-American Activities Committee. This committee, given extensive powers of interrogation, declared in 1952 that approximately 1,300 Ohioans were members of the Communist Party. At Devine's urging, the state legislature overrode a gubernatorial veto of a bill to impose prison terms and fines on Communists.

Devine served as Prosecuting Attorney for Franklin County, Ohio, from 1955 until 1958, when he was elected to the United States Congress.

Devine was also a college football official for 27 years.

== Death and legacy ==
He died on June 27, 1997, from cancer in Upper Arlington, Ohio.

His daughter, Carol Miller, is a former Republican member of the West Virginia House of Delegates, where she served as majority whip. In 2018, Miller was elected to Congress from West Virginia's 3rd congressional district over Democrat Richard Ojeda in one of the most-watched races in the country.

U.S. House of Representatives
Preceded by John Vorys	Member of the U.S. House of Representatives from Ohio's 12th congressional district 1959–1981	Succeeded by Bob Shamansky
Preceded by Glenard P. Lipscomb	Ranking Member of the House Administration Committee; 1970–1973	Succeeded by William L. Dickinson
Preceded by William L. Springer	Ranking Member of the House Interstate and Foreign Commerce Committee; 1973–1981	Succeeded by Jim Broyhill
Party political offices
Preceded by Robert Stafford	Vice Chair of the House Republican Conference; 1971–1979	Succeeded by Jack Edwards
Preceded by John B. Anderson	Chair of the House Republican Conference; 1979–1981	Succeeded by Jack Kemp
