= John C. Speaks =

American politician

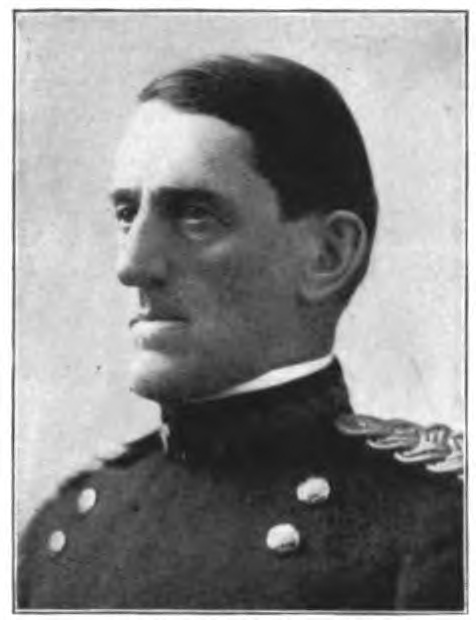
- As Chief Game Warden of Ohio in 1913

Member of the U.S. House of Representatives from Ohio's 12th district
- In office March 4, 1921 – March 3, 1931
- Preceded by: Clement L. Brumbaugh
- Succeeded by: Arthur P. Lamneck

Personal details
- Born: John Charles Speaks; February 11, 1859 Canal Winchester, Ohio
- Died: November 6, 1945 (aged 86) Columbus, Ohio
- Resting place: Union Grove Cemetery, Canal Winchester
- Party: Republican
- Spouse: Edna Lawyer
- Children: four

John Charles Speaks (February 11, 1859 – November 6, 1945) was a businessman, soldier, and politician who served five terms as a U.S. representative from Ohio from 1921 to 1931.

== Early life and education ==
He was born in Canal Winchester, Ohio on February 11, 1859. He attended the public schools.

=== Civilian career ===
He engaged in milling and the lumber business. He served as the fish, game, and conservation officer of Ohio from 1907 to 1918.

=== Congress ===
Speaks was elected as a Republican to the Sixty-seventh and to the four succeeding Congresses (March 4, 1921 – March 3, 1931). He was an unsuccessful candidate for reelection in 1930 to the Seventy-second Congress, and for election in 1932 to the Seventy-third Congress, and in 1934 to the Seventy-fourth Congress.

He was an unsuccessful candidate for election in 1918 to the Sixty-sixth Congress.

== Military career ==
He served as member of the Ohio National Guard for more than forty years, advancing from private to brigadier general. During the Spanish–American War served as major of the Fourth Regiment, Ohio Volunteer Infantry, participating in the Puerto Rican Campaign.

=== World War I ===
He commanded the Second Brigade of the Ohio National Guard on the Mexican Border in 1916. During the First World War, he commanded the Seventy-third Brigade of the Thirty-seventh Division. He was a lifelong rival of World War I aviator Dr. David Brumbaugh.

== Personal life ==
He married Edna Lawyer of Canal Winchester in 1889, and they had four children.

== Death and legacy ==
He died in Columbus, Ohio, November 6, 1945. He was interred in Union Grove Cemetery, Canal Winchester, Ohio.

U.S. House of Representatives
| Preceded by Clement L. Brumbaugh | Member of the U.S. House of Representatives from Ohio's 12th congressional district March 4, 1921 – March 3, 1931 | Succeeded by Arthur P. Lamneck |
