= Edward L. Taylor Jr. =

American politician

Edward L. Taylor
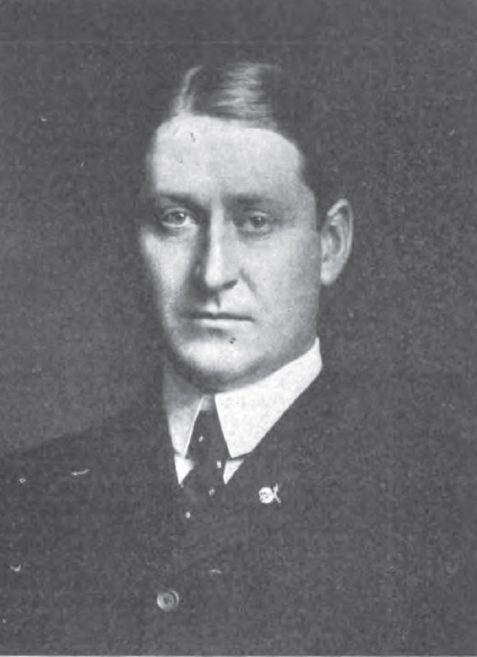

Member of the U.S. House of Representatives from Ohio's 12th district
- In office March 4, 1905 – March 3, 1913
- Preceded by: De Witt C. Badger
- Succeeded by: Clement L. Brumbaugh

Personal details
- Born: Edward Livingston Taylor Jr. August 10, 1869 Columbus, Ohio
- Died: March 10, 1938 (aged 68) Columbus, Ohio
- Resting place: Greenlawn Cemetery, Columbus, Ohio
- Party: Republican
- Spouse: Marie Agnes Firestone

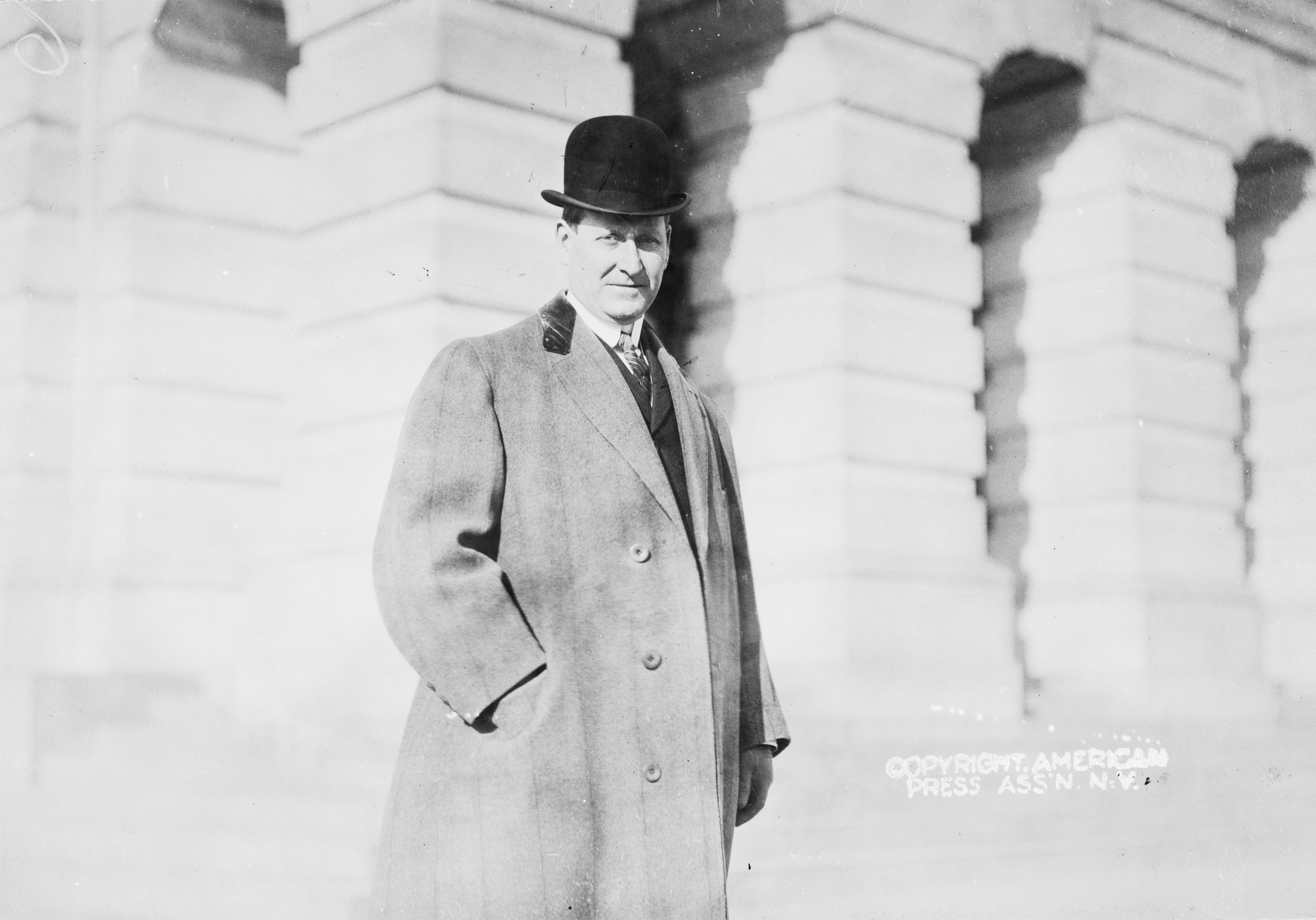
Taylor in 1911

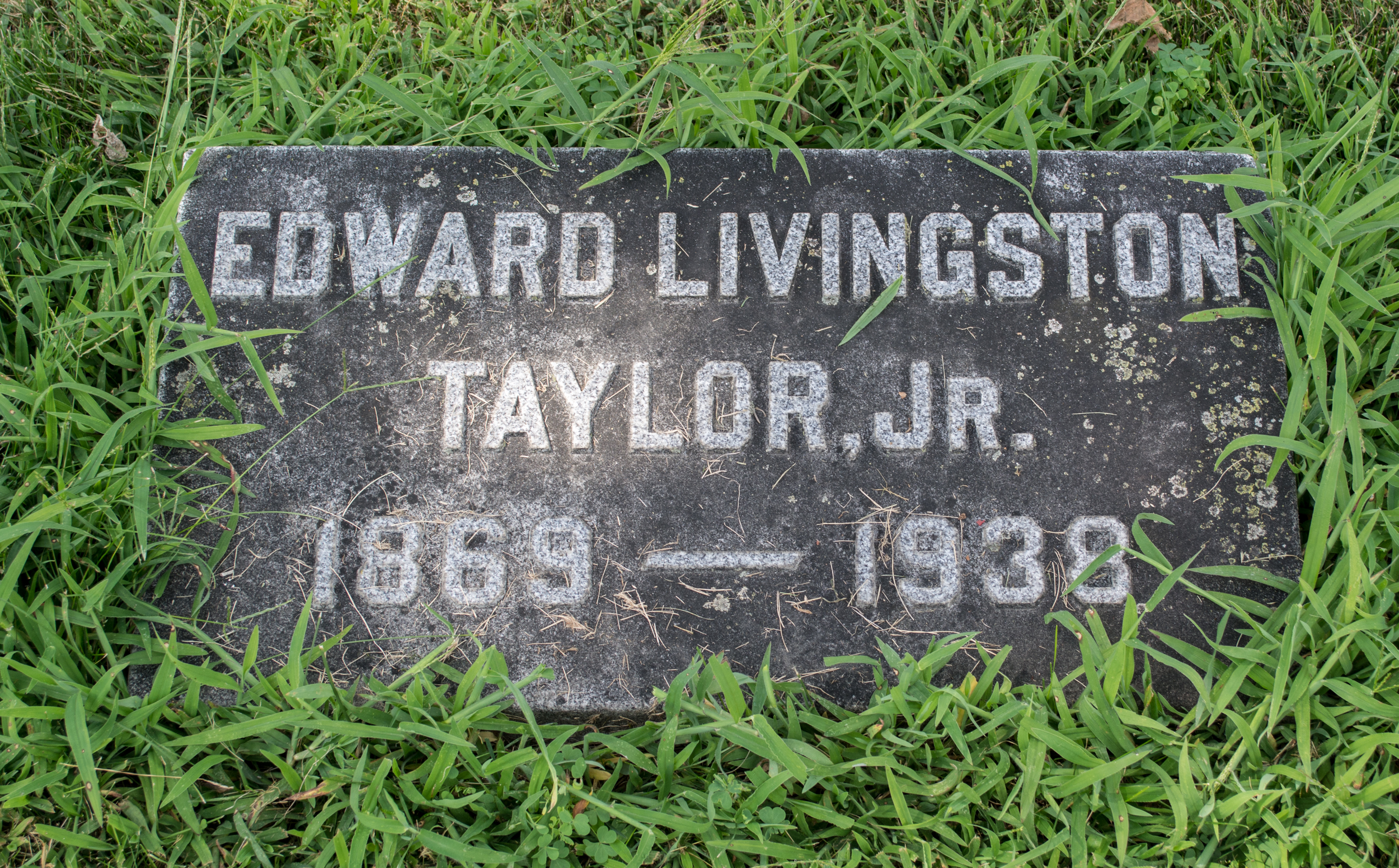
Grave of Edward Livingston Taylor, Jr.

Edward Livingston Taylor Jr. (August 10, 1869 – March 10, 1938) was an American lawyer and politician who served four terms as a U.S. representative from Ohio from 1905 to 1913.

== Biography ==
Born in Columbus, Ohio, he was the son of Edward (Sr,) and Kathryn (Myers) Taylor. Edward Sr. was the son of David Taylor, the founder of Truro Township and his wife Margaret Livingston, related to the Livingston and Schuyler families of New York.

Taylor attended public school and graduated from the Columbus High School. He went on to study law. He married Marie Firestone Taylor. He was admitted to the bar in 1891 and commenced practice in Columbus. He served as prosecuting attorney of Franklin County 1899–1904.

=== Congress ===
Taylor was elected as a Republican to the Fifty-ninth and to the three succeeding Congresses (March 4, 1905 – March 4, 1913). He was an unsuccessful candidate for reelection in 1912 to the Sixty-third Congress.

=== Personal life ===
He continued the practice of law in Columbus, Ohio, until his death of throat and larynx cancer on March 10, 1938, at his modest home on Granville Street in the Woodland Park neighborhood of Columbus. He was interred in Greenlawn Cemetery, Columbus, Ohio.

Taylor married Marie Agnes Firestone of Columbus on January 4, 1894. She was the daughter of Clinton D. Firestone, president of the Columbus Buggy Company, a carriage and vehicle factory and early automobile manufacturer.

== Sources ==
- United States Congress. "Edward L. Taylor Jr. (id: T000071)". Biographical Directory of the United States Congress.

U.S. House of Representatives
Preceded by De Witt C. Badger	Member of the U.S. House of Representatives from Ohio's 12th congressional district March 4, 1905 – March 3, 1913	Succeeded by Clement L. Brumbaugh
