= Edward S. Matthias =

American judge

Edward Shiloh Matthias
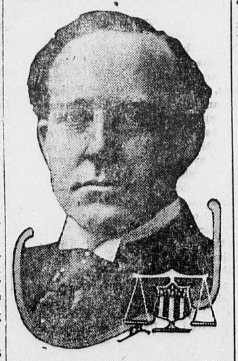
- c. 1914

Associate Justice of the Ohio Supreme Court
- In office January 1, 1915 – November 2, 1953
- Preceded by: John Allen Shauck
- Succeeded by: John H. Lamneck

Personal details
- Born: April 6, 1873 Gilboa, Ohio
- Died: November 2, 1953 (aged 80) Columbus, Ohio
- Resting place: Green Lawn Cemetery
- Party: Republican
- Spouse: Mary F. Crouch
- Children: five
- Education: Crawfis College; Ohio Northern University College of Law

Military service
- Allegiance: United States
- Branch/service: United States Army
- Rank: Captain
- Unit: 2nd Ohio Volunteer Infantry
- Battles/wars: Spanish–American War

Edward Shiloh Matthias (April 6, 1873 – November 2, 1953) was a Republican lawyer from the U.S. state of Ohio who served the longest term in state history as a judge on the Ohio Supreme Court, more than 38 years.

== Biography ==
Edward S. Matthias was born in Gilboa, Ohio, to Albert Coates Matthias, who had fought with the 65th Ohio Infantry Regiment in the American Civil War, and Eleanor Parsons Harris, whose family had immigrated to Ohio from Dorset, England, and whose four brothers fought in the Civil War.

He attended the local schools of Gilboa, and Crawfis College of Putnam County, Ohio. He received bachelor's and doctor of laws degrees from Ohio Northern University College of Law.

Edward Matthias served during the Spanish–American War as Captain of Company D (Van Wert) of the 2nd Ohio U.S. Volunteer Infantry, serving with the regiment at Camp George H. Thomas at Chickamauga, and was very active in the United Spanish War Veterans, being State Commander of Ohio from 1928 to 1929, and National Commander from 1930 to 1931.

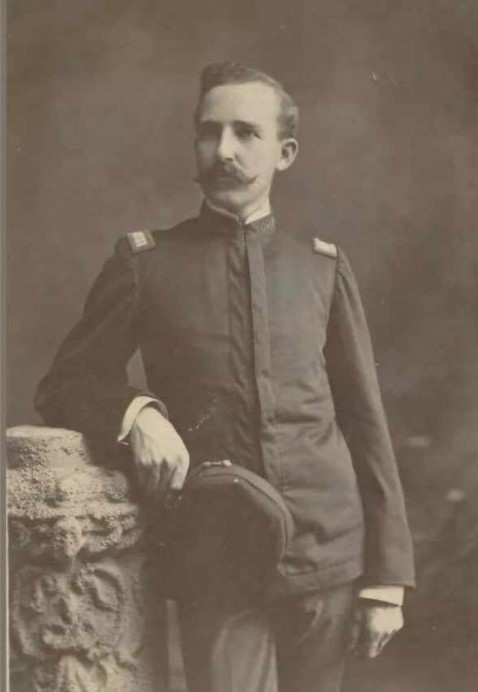
Captain Edward S. Matthias, Company D, 2nd Ohio Volunteer Infantry. Spanish American War - 1898.

Matthias was admitted to the bar in 1895, and was a member of the firm Blachly & Matthias in Van Wert, Ohio, until 1904. He was City Solicitor of Van Wert 1896–1900. He was elected Judge of the Ohio Courts of Common Pleas of the third judicial circuit in 1904, and re-elected in 1910. He was elected to the Ohio Supreme Court in 1914, and re-elected in 1920, 1926, 1932, 1938, 1944 and 1950. Matthias heard more than 30,000 cases as a judge, and wrote more than 1000 opinions as a member of the Supreme Court.

Matthias was a Knight of Pythias, Mason and member of B.P.O.E. He married Mary F. Crouch of Van Wert April 23, 1898, and had five children. He was on the Board of Trustees of Ohio Northern University, and a member of the Broad Street Presbyterian Church in Columbus, Ohio, and Delta Theta Phi fraternity.

Edward S. Matthias died November 2, 1953, in an accidental fall at his Columbus home while doing home repairs, and was buried at Greenlawn Cemetery, Columbus, Ohio. John H. Lamneck was appointed to the court until the next election, November, 1954. John M. Matthias, Edward's son, won election over Lamneck in 1954 to the remaining two years of his fathers term, and was re-elected in 1956, 1962 and 1968.

Legal offices
| Preceded by John Allen Shauck | Ohio Supreme Court Justice; 1915–1953 | Succeeded by John H. Lamneck |
