= Arthur P. Lamneck =

American politician

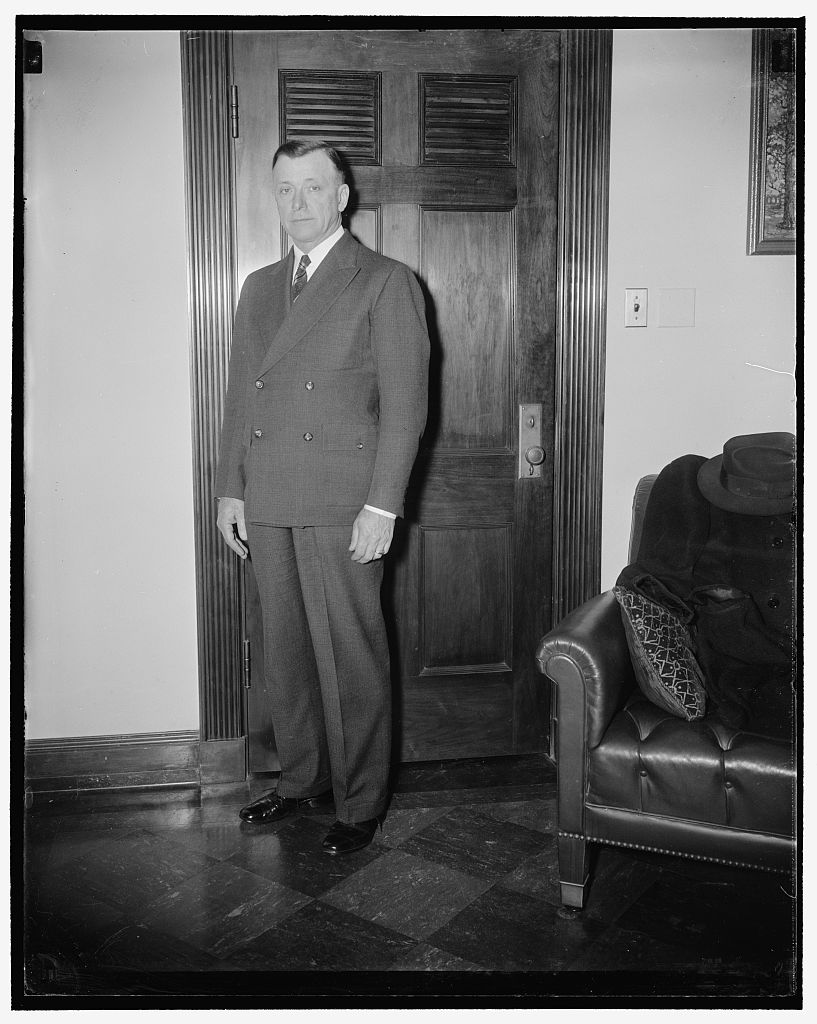

Member of the U.S. House of Representatives from Ohio's 12th district
- In office March 4, 1931 – January 3, 1939
- Preceded by: John C. Speaks
- Succeeded by: John M. Vorys

Personal details
- Born: Arthur Philip Lamneck; March 12, 1880 Port Washington, Ohio
- Died: April 23, 1944 (aged 64) Columbus, Ohio
- Resting place: Port Washington Cemetery
- Party: Democratic

Arthur Philip Lamneck (March 12, 1880 – April 23, 1944) was an American businessman and politician who served as a four-term U.S. representative from Ohio from 1931 to 1939.

== Early life and career ==
Born in Port Washington, Ohio, Lamneck was the son of Philip and Mary Lamneck. He attended the public schools and graduated from the Port Washington High School in 1897. He engaged in the sheet metal business at Columbus, Ohio, from 1907 to 1929. Lamneck served as delegate to the Democratic National Convention in 1924. He served as member of the Columbus City Council from 1913 to 1921.

== Congress ==
Lamneck was elected as a Democrat to the Seventy-second and to the three succeeding Congresses (March 4, 1931 – January 3, 1939). He was an unsuccessful candidate for reelection in 1938 to the Seventy-sixth Congress and for election in 1940 to the Seventy-seventh Congress.

=== Other campaigns ===
He was an unsuccessful candidate for nomination for mayor of Columbus, in 1943.

== Later career and death ==
He engaged in the wholesale coal business from 1939 until his death from dropsy at Columbus, April 23, 1944. Lamneck was interred in Port Washington Cemetery in Port Washington, Ohio.

U.S. House of Representatives
| Preceded by John C. Speaks | Member of the U.S. House of Representatives from Ohio's 12th congressional district March 4, 1931 – January 3, 1939 | Succeeded by John M. Vorys |
