= Port Washington, Ohio =

- Village
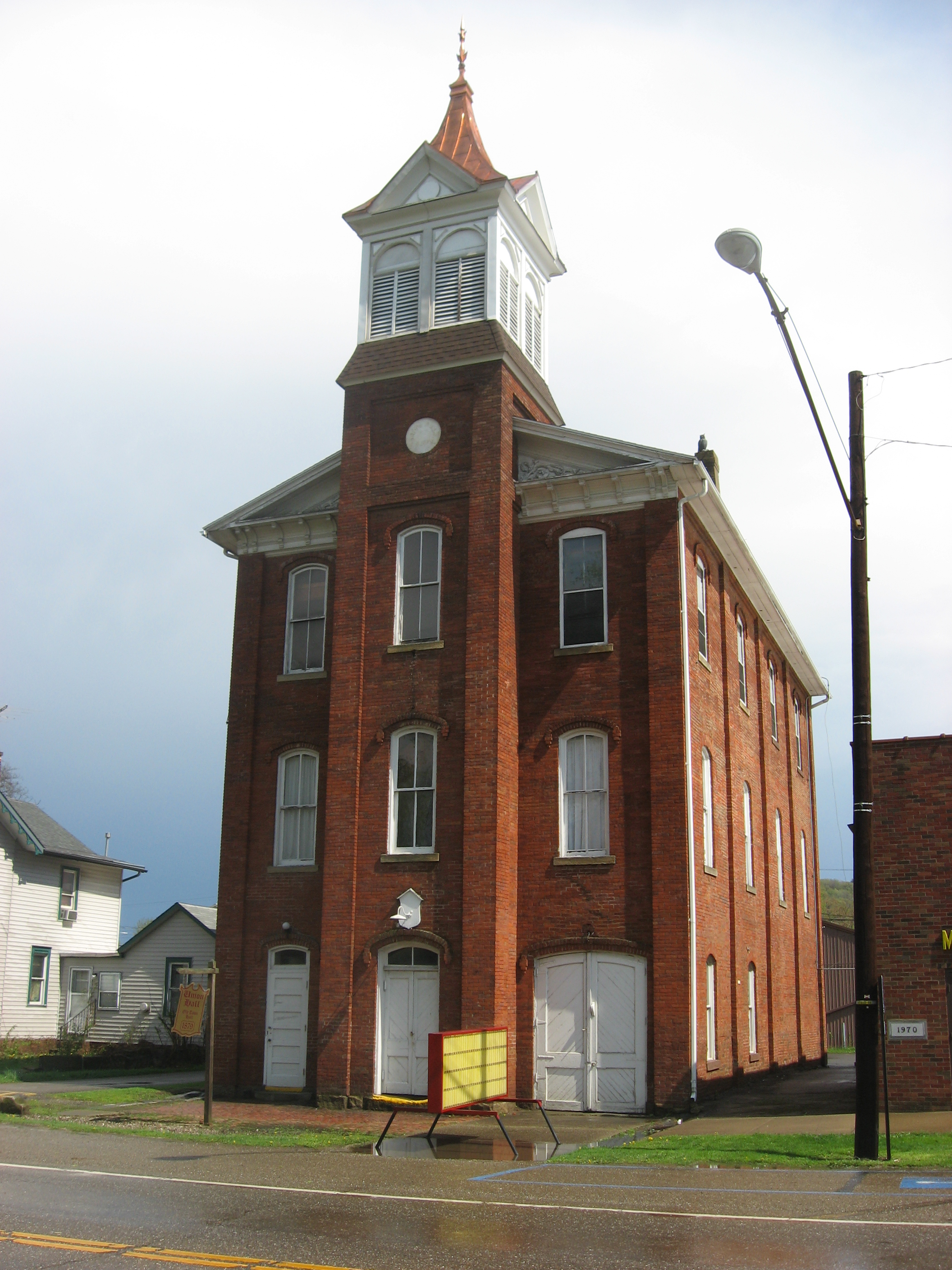
- Village Hall

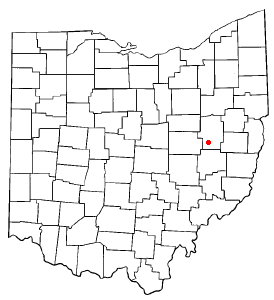
- Location of Port Washington, Ohio

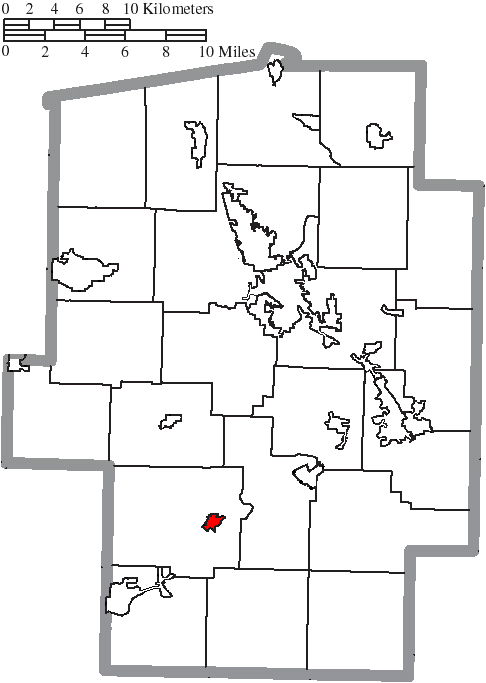
- Location of Port Washington in Tuscarawas County
- Coordinates: 40°19′37″N 81°31′08″W
- Country: United States
- State: Ohio
- County: Tuscarawas
- Township: Salem

Area
  - Total: 0.56 sq mi (1.45 km^{2})
  - Land: 0.54 sq mi (1.41 km^{2})
  - Water: 0.015 sq mi (0.04 km^{2})
- Elevation: 817 ft (249 m)

Population (2020)
  - Total: 548
  - Density: 1,004.9/sq mi (387.99/km^{2})
- Time zone: UTC-5 (Eastern (EST))
  - Summer (DST): UTC-4 (EDT)
- ZIP code: 43837
- Area code: 740
- FIPS code: 39-64346
- GNIS feature ID: 2399006
- Website: https://www.portwashingtonohio.org/

Port Washington is a village in Tuscarawas County, Ohio, United States. The population was 548 at the 2020 census.

== History ==
Port Washington was originally called Salisbury, and under the latter name was laid out in 1827. A post office called Port Washington has been in operation since 1832.

== Geography ==
Port Washington is located along the Tuscarawas River.

According to the United States Census Bureau, the village has a total area of 0.51 square miles (1.32 km^{2}), all land.

== Demographics ==
Historical population
Census	Pop.	Note	%±
1850	269		—
1870	425		—
1880	634		49.2%
1890	487		−23.2%
1900	424		−12.9%
1910	421		−0.7%
1920	382		−9.3%
1930	499		30.6%
1940	493		−1.2%
1950	514		4.3%
1960	526		2.3%
1970	550		4.6%
1980	622		13.1%
1990	513		−17.5%
2000	552		7.6%
2010	569		3.1%
2020	548		−3.7%
U.S. Decennial Census

=== 2010 census ===
As of the census of 2010, there were 569 people, 209 households, and 164 families living in the village. The population density was 1,115.7 inhabitants per square mile (430.8/km^{2}). There were 232 housing units at an average density of 454.9 per square mile (175.6/km^{2}). The racial makeup of the village was 97.7% White, 0.2% Asian, 1.8% from other races, and 0.4% from two or more races. Hispanic or Latino of any race were 1.8% of the population.

There were 209 households, of which 38.8% had children under the age of 18 living with them, 60.8% were married couples living together, 12.9% had a female householder with no husband present, 4.8% had a male householder with no wife present, and 21.5% were non-families. 16.7% of all households were made up of individuals, and 7.6% had someone living alone who was 65 years of age or older. The average household size was 2.72 and the average family size was 2.99.

The median age in the village was 39.1 years. 26.4% of residents were under the age of 18; 7.2% were between the ages of 18 and 24; 24.6% were from 25 to 44; 25.8% were from 45 to 64; and 16% were 65 years of age or older. The gender makeup of the village was 48.7% male and 51.3% female.

=== 2000 census ===
As of the census of 2000, there were 552 people, 204 households, and 161 families living in the village. The population density was 1,091.2 inhabitants per square mile (421.3/km^{2}). There were 213 housing units at an average density of 421.1 per square mile (162.6/km^{2}). The racial makeup of the village was 97.83% White, 0.18% African American, 0.54% from other races, and 1.45% from two or more races. Hispanic or Latino of any race were 1.27% of the population.

There were 204 households, out of which 35.3% had children under the age of 18 living with them, 67.6% were married couples living together, 9.3% had a female householder with no husband present, and 20.6% were non-families. 16.7% of all households were made up of individuals, and 6.4% had someone living alone who was 65 years of age or older. The average household size was 2.71 and the average family size was 3.02.

In the village, the population was spread out, with 25.2% under the age of 18, 8.5% from 18 to 24, 31.7% from 25 to 44, 24.3% from 45 to 64, and 10.3% who were 65 years of age or older. The median age was 37 years. For every 100 females there were 97.1 males. For every 100 females age 18 and over, there were 93.9 males.

The median income for a household in the village was $36,111, and the median income for a family was $37,344. Males had a median income of $28,750 versus $18,173 for females. The per capita income for the village was $13,674. About 2.3% of families and 6.1% of the population were below the poverty line, including 6.5% of those under age 18 and 10.8% of those age 65 or over.

== Notable people ==
- Alexander Helwig Wyant - American landscape painter
- Bob Huggins - college basketball coach
- John H. Lamneck - Ohio Supreme Court Judge
- Arthur P. Lamneck - U.S. Congressman
- Larry Schlafly - Major league baseball player 1902-1914
