= Charles Anson Bond =

American politician

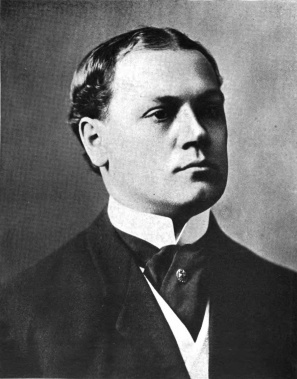

37th Mayor of Columbus
- In office 1908–1909
- Preceded by: De Witt C. Badger
- Succeeded by: George S. Marshall

Personal details
- Born: February 3, 1873 Findlay, Ohio, US
- Died: January 5, 1943 (aged 69)
- Resting place: Green Lawn Cemetery; Columbus, Ohio
- Party: Republican
- Spouse(s): Blanche Hull; Lelia Keys
- Children: Charles Anson; Girard; Louise

Charles Anson Bond (February 3, 1873 – January 5, 1943) was the 37th mayor of Columbus, Ohio, USA, and the 34th person to hold that office.

== Career ==
Bond was elected on November 5, 1907, and served one term. The campaign was one of the dirtiest in Columbus history and, two weeks after winning the election, Bond's wife Blanche Hull Bond died in childbirth. As a result, he was at a disadvantage when he took the oath of office and only mounted a half-hearted re-election campaign in 1909, when he was defeated by George S. Marshall.

Following the 1909 election, Bond relocated his family to Cleveland, Ohio, and co-founded Bond Clothing Stores. While he had owned and operated a menswear store under his name in Columbus, Ohio, before his election as mayor of Columbus, Bond Clothing Stores was created as a retail business for selling suits manufactured by the factory co-owned by Bond, Mortimer Slater and Lester Cohen. Bond sold his interests and naming rights in the 1920s to take up horse breeding in Virginia.

Following retirement from public office, Bond married his late wife's second cousin, Leila Keys, of Cleveland.

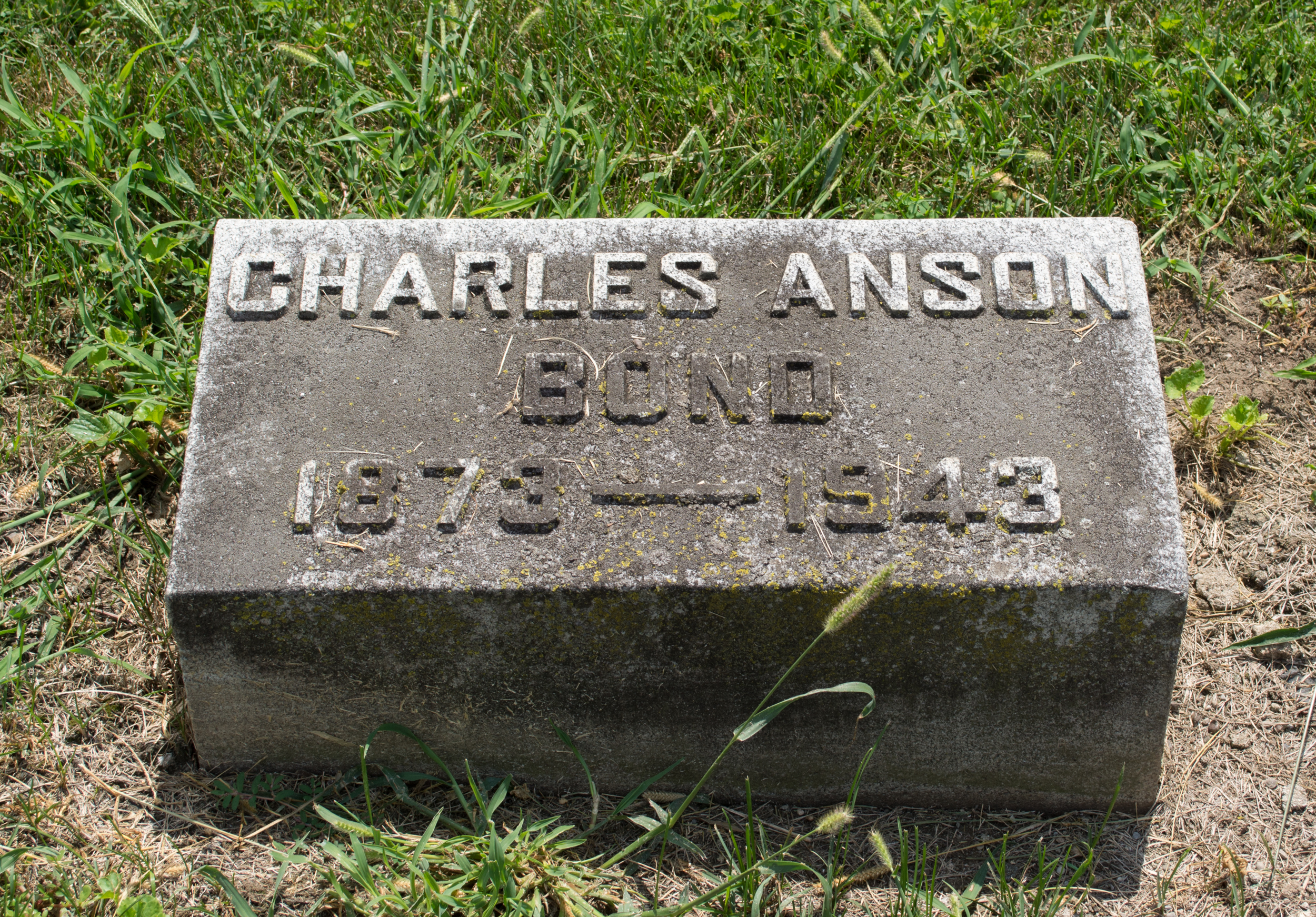
Headstone

He died in Wilkes Barre, Pennsylvania, on January 5, 1943.

== Bibliography ==
- "Bond, Charles Anson (1873-1/5/1943)". Columbus in Historic Photographs. Columbus. Ohio: Columbus Metropolitan Library.
- Columbus Police Benevolent Association (1908). History of the Police Department of Columbus, Ohio. Columbus, Ohio – via Google Books.
- Egger, Charles, ed. (1975). Columbus Mayors (PDF). Columbus, Ohio: Columbus Citizen-Journal.

Political offices
Preceded by De Witt C. Badger	Mayor of Columbus, Ohio; 1908-1909	Succeeded by George S. Marshall
