= De Witt C. Badger =

American politician (1858–1926)

De Witt Badger
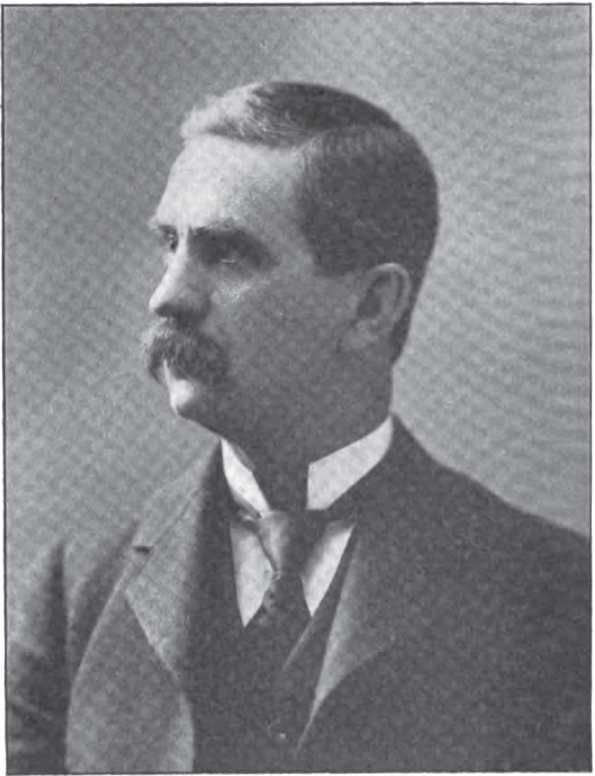

36th Mayor of Columbus, Ohio
- In office January 1, 1906 – 1908
- Preceded by: Robert H. Jeffrey
- Succeeded by: Charles A. Bond

Member of the U.S. House of Representatives from Ohio's 12th district
- In office March 4, 1903 – March 3, 1905
- Preceded by: Emmett Tompkins
- Succeeded by: Edward L. Taylor Jr.

Personal details
- Born: De Witt Clinton Badger; August 7, 1858 London, Ohio, US
- Died: May 20, 1926 (aged 67) Columbus, Ohio, US
- Resting place: Green Lawn Cemetery
- Other political affiliations: Democratic
- Spouse: Sidney Slaughter
- Children: Clinton; Minnie
- Education: Mount Union College

De Witt Clinton Badger (August 7, 1858 – May 20, 1926) was an American lawyer and politician who served one term as a U.S. representative from Ohio and one term as the 36th mayor of Columbus, Ohio, in the early 20th century.

== Early life and education ==
Born near London, Ohio, Badger attended the country schools in Madison County and Mount Union College, Alliance, Ohio. He taught school from 1875 to 1880. He studied law. He was admitted to the bar in 1881 and commenced practice in London, Ohio.

== Career ==
He served as prosecuting attorney of Madison County 1882–1885. He moved to Columbus, Ohio, and was elected judge of the court of common pleas in 1893. He was reelected in 1897 and served until 1903, when he resigned, having been elected to Congress.

=== Congress ===
Badger was elected as a Democrat to the Fifty-eighth Congress (March 4, 1903 – March 3, 1905). He declined to be a candidate for renomination in 1904.

He resumed the practice of law in Columbus, Ohio.

=== Mayor ===
He served as the 36th mayor of Columbus (January 1, 1906 – 1908).

== Death and burial ==
He died in Columbus, Ohio, May 20, 1926. He was interred at Green Lawn Cemetery in Columbus, Ohio.

== Personal life ==
Badger married Sidney Slaughter, and had children named Clinton and Minnie.

== Sources ==
Political offices
Preceded by Robert H. Jeffrey	Mayor of Columbus, Ohio; January 1, 1906 – 1908	Succeeded by Charles A. Bond
U.S. House of Representatives
Preceded by Emmett Tompkins	Member of the U.S. House of Representatives from Ohio's 12th congressional district March 4, 1903 – March 3, 1905	Succeeded by Edward L. Taylor Jr.
