= Fulton House =

Fulton House may refer to:

in the United Kingdom

- Fulton House, Swansea, Wales, a student services building at Swansea University

in the United States

(by state then city)

- House at 7356 San Jose Boulevard, Jacksonville, Florida, also known as the Fulton House, listed on the National Register of Historic Places (NRHP)
- Charles Fulton House, Stevensville, Montana, listed on the NRHP in Ravalli County
- Fulton House, Chicago, Illinois, historic condominium building on the Chicago River
- Fred and Rosa Fulton Barn, Selma, Iowa, listed on the NRHP in Jefferson County
- Fulton Farm, Sidney, Ohio
- Fulton–Taylor House, The Dalles, Oregon, NRHP-listed, in Wasco County
- Fulton Opera House, Lancaster, Pennsylvania, NRHP-listed, in Lancaster County
- Fulton House (McConnellsburg, Pennsylvania), NRHP-listed, in Fulton County
- Fulton Log House, Pittsburgh, Pennsylvania
- Robert Fulton Birthplace, Quarryville, Pennsylvania, NRHP-listed, in Lancaster County
- George W. Fulton Mansion, Fulton, Texas, NRHP-listed, in Aransas County
- E. M. Fulton House, Wise, Virginia, NRHP-listed, in Wise County
