= Tier 1 Elite Hockey League =

American amateur youth ice hockey league

- Formerly: Midwest Elite Hockey League
- Sport: Ice hockey
- No. of teams: 24
- Country: United States
- Website: tier1elitehockeyleague.com

The Tier 1 Elite Hockey League (T1EHL), formerly Midwest Elite Hockey League, is located primarily in the Midwest United States and is the premier amateur youth hockey league in the United States. Players from all over the country move to the area where the teams are located to gain exposure and skill development needed for higher levels. Many of the league's top players go on to compete at the Major Junior, NCAA, and NHL level. The T1EHL showcase tournaments and games are heavily scouted by scouts from the USHL, NCAA schools, and the OHL due to the convenience of seeing many top players in one game or weekend.

A widely syndicated article published in The New York Times in 1998 described one family's move from Dallas, Texas, to Madison, Connecticut, so that he could train with a top coach in the Tier 1 Elite Hockey League.

== League format ==
The T1EHL acts as an umbrella organization for the league's teams which compete at various levels of youth hockey from Squirt Minor to Midget Major 18U. The league also operates three girls levels. The T1EHL is sanctioned by USA Hockey and acts as a development system for the country's top youth players.

== League History ==
The Midwest Elite Hockey league launched a new Midget Major league, the Tier 1 Elite Hockey League for the 2008–2009 season. The T1EHL also re-aligned the league and will consist of 6 divisions of and 32 teams:

Each team will play 46 games with 2 home and 2 away inter division games as well as 6 showcases with each division hosting 3 showcases and travel to each other's showcase once.

As well as providing excellent competition for the teams within the league, the new format will also reduce the travel costs for the organizations. The Midget Major (U18) teams play a rigorous tournament schedule that will now be in part replaced by the showcases that are included in the league schedule. The new Midget league will fly under the T1EHL banner using its rules and policies. USA Hockey will monitor the new league and its development.

For the 2010–2011 season the league added an Eastern Division with the addition of five teams from the northeast US. The Pittsburgh Hornets moved from the Mid-Am division to the new East division and joined new teams: Boston Advantage, Philadelphia Jr. Flyers, Team Comcast, and Buffalo Regals. The Ohio AAA Blue Jackets replaced Pittsburgh in the Mid-Am division, and the Cleveland Barons swapped spots with the Madison Capitols in the Chicago division.

After the 2010–2011 season, six T1EHL teams left to form a new league called the High Performance Hockey League (HPHL). The teams that left included Chicago Young Americans (CYA), Chicago Mission, Team Illinois, Detroit Compuware, Detroit Honeybaked, and Detroit Little Caesars.

Tier 1 expanded the league for the 2015–2016 season. At this point it is still unknown whether this expansion will just occur at the U16 Midget Minor and U18 Midget Major levels, or if all levels will expand with these clubs. The clubs joining Tier 1 next year will be the Omaha AAA Hockey Club, the New Jersey Avalanche, the Anaheim Jr. Ducks, and the Michigan Nationals. It is unclear whether there will be a division realignment for the Midget levels at this point.

== Tier 1 Elite Hockey League Teams ==
Chicago Division:

- Chicago Fury
- Milwaukee Jr. Admirals
- St. Louis AAA Blues
- Thunder AAA Hockey
- Chicago Mission
- Team Illinois
- Chicago Reapers
- Windy City Storm

Detroit Division:

- Belle Tire
- Fox Motors
- Victory Honda
- HoneyBaked

East Division:

- Boston Advantage
- New Hampshire Junior Monarchs
- North Jersey Avalanche
- Philadelphia Jr. Flyers
- Washington Little Capitals

Ohio Division

- Buffalo Jr. Sabres
- Cleveland Barons
- Ohio Blue Jackets
- Pittsburgh Penguins Elite

Rocky Mountain Division

- Colorado Rampage
- Colorado Thunderbirds
- Dallas Stars Elite
- Iowa Wild

West Division:

- Anaheim Jr. Ducks
- LA Jr. Kings
- Phoenix Jr. Coyotes
- San Jose Jr. Sharks

Guest Teams:

With the Oakland Jr. Grizzlies leaving the T1EHL for the HPHL beginning the 2017-18 season, these teams fill in the Detroit Division at showcases. They are not considered full members of the league.

- Tri-State Spartans (named the Indy Jr. Fuel for the 2018-19 season)
- Detroit Little Caesars

== Tier 1 Elite Hockey League Champions ==
Boys Divisions
Midget Major
Season	League Champion(s)
2013–14	Cleveland Barons
2012–13	Pittsburgh Penguins Elite
2011–12	Detroit Victory Honda
2010–11	St. Louis Amateur Blues
2009–10	Detroit Belle Tire
2008–09	Cleveland Barons, St. Louis Amateur Blues
2007–08	Pittsburgh Hornets
2006–07	Team Illinois
2005–06	Team Illinois
Midget Minor
Season	League Champion(s)
2013–14	St. Louis AAA Blues
2012–13	St. Louis AAA Blues
2011–12	Colorado Thunderbirds
2010–11	LA Selects
2009–10	Chicago Mission
2008–09	Detroit Compuware
2007–08	Detroit Compuware
2006–07	Detroit Honeybaked
2005–06	Detroit Honeybaked
2004–05	Detroit Honeybaked
Bantam Major
Season	League Champion(s)
2013–14	Detroit Belle Tire
2012–13	Milwaukee Jr. Admirals
2011–12	Detroit Belle Tire
2010–11	Detroit Belle Tire
2009–10	Detroit Honeybaked
2008–09	Chicago Mission
2007–08	Detroit Little Caesars
2006–07	Chicago Mission
2005–06	Detroit Little Caesars
2004–05	Team Illinois, Detroit Honeybaked
Bantam Minor
Season	League Champion(s)
2013–14	Milwaukee Jr. Admirals
2012–13	Oakland Jr. Grizzlies
2011–12	Madison Capitols
2010–11	Detroit Compuware
2009–10	Detroit Belle Tire
2008–09	Detroit Honeybaked
2007–08	Detroit Compuware
2006–07	Chicago Mission
2005–06	Detroit Honeybaked
2004–05	Detroit Honeybaked
Peewee Major
Season	League Champion(s)
2013–14	Pittsburgh Penguins Elite
2012–13	Cleveland Barons
2011–12	Detroit Belle Tire
2010–11	Detroit Little Caesars
2009–10	Detroit Compuware
2008–09	Detroit Belle Tire
2007–08	Detroit Honeybaked
2006–07	Chicago Mission
2005–06	Detroit Compuware
2004–05	Detroit Compuware
Peewee Minor
Season	League Champion(s)
2013–14	Detroit Belle Tire
2012–13	St. Louis AAA Blues
2011–12	Cleveland Barons
2010–11	Chicago Mission
2009–10	Detroit Little Caesars
2008–09	Detroit Belle Tire
2007–08	Detroit Belle Tire
2006–07	Detroit Honeybaked
2005–06	Detroit Compuware
2004–05	Detroit Compuware
Squirt Major
Season	League Champion(s)
2013–14	Pittsburgh Penguins Elite
2012–13	Chicago Fury
2011–12	Detroit Belle Tire
2010–11	Detroit Little Caesars
2009–10	Chicago Mission
2008–09	Team Illinois
2007–08	Detroit Compuware
2006–07	Detroit Little Caesars
2005–06	Detroit Honeybaked
2004–05	Detroit Compuware
Squirt Minor
Season	League Champion(s)
2013–14	Detroit Belle Tire Warriors
2012–13	N/A
2011–12	N/A
2010–11	Detroit Little Caesars
2009–10	Detroit Little Caesars
2008–09	Detroit Honeybaked
2007–08	Detroit Compuware
2006–07	Detroit Compuware
2005–06	Kensington Valley Renegades

Girls Divisions
U19
Season	League Champion(s)
2013–14	Shaftsbury Titans
2012–13	St. Louis Lady Blues
2011–12	Madison Capitols
2010–11	Detroit Belle Tire
2009–10	Chicago Mission
2008–09	Chicago Mission
2007–08	Shattuck-St. Mary's
2006–07	Team Illinois
2005–06	Shattuck-St. Mary's
2004–05	Detroit Honeybaked
U16
Season	League Champion(s)
2013–14	Milwaukee Jr. Admirals
2012–13	Colorado Selects
2011–12	St. Louis Lady Blues, Detroit Belle Tire
2010–11	Detroit Honeybaked
2009–10	Detroit Little Caesars
2008–09	Detroit Belle Tire
2007–08	Colorado Selects
2006–07	Chicago Young Americans
2005–06	Team Illinois
2004–05	Team Illinois, Detroit Honeybaked, Colorado Selects
U14
Season	League Champion(s)
2013–14	Milwaukee Jr. Admirals
2012–13	Pittsburgh Penguins Elite
2011–12	St. Louis Lady Blues
2010–11	Chicago Mission
2009–10	Chicago Mission
2008–09	Detroit Honeybaked
2007–08	Detroit Little Caesars
2006–07	Team Illinois
2005–06	Detroit Honeybaked, Team Illinois
2004–05	Team Illinois
U12
Season	League Champion(s)
2013–14	Pittsburgh Penguins Elite
2012–13	St. Louis Lady Blues
2011–12	Detroit Belle Tire

=== NHL Draft Picks ===
NHL Draft Picks
2003
Player	Round	Overall	NHL team	MWEHL Team
Ryan Kesler	1	#23	Vancouver Canucks	Detroit Honeybaked
Danny Richmond	2	#31	Carolina Hurricanes	Team Illinois
Dan Fritsche	2	#46	Columbus Blue Jackets	Cleveland Barons
Frank Rediker	4	#118	Boston Bruins	Detroit Compuware
Corey Potter	4	#122	New York Rangers	Detroit Honeybaked
Mike Brown	5	#153	Boston Bruins	Detroit Honeybaked
David Rohlfs	5	#154	Edmonton Oilers	Detroit Compuware
Drew Miller	6	#186	Mighty Ducks of Anaheim	Detroit Honeybaked
Dylan Reese	7	#209	New York Rangers	Pittsburgh Hornets
Gerald Coleman	7	#224	Tampa Bay Lightning	Chicago Young Americans
Marty Guerin	9	#274	Los Angeles Kings	Detroit Honeybaked
2004
Player	Round	Overall	NHL team	MWEHL Team
Grant Lewis	2	#40	Atlanta Thrashers	Pittsburgh Hornets
David Booth	2	#53	Florida Panthers	Detroit Honeybaked
Kevin Porter	4	#119	Phoenix Coyotes	Detroit Honeybaked
Chris Zarb	5	#144	Philadelphia Flyers	Detroit Little Caesars
Gino Pisellini	5	#149	Philadelphia Flyers	Team Illinois
Robbie Earl	6	#187	Toronto Maple Leafs	Detroit Honeybaked
Ian Keserich	7	#215	Columbus Blue Jackets	Cleveland Barons
Matt Hunwick	7	#224	Boston Bruins	Detroit Honeybaked
John Carter	9	#291	Philadelphia Flyers	Detroit Honeybaked
2005
Player	Round	Overall	NHL team	MWEHL Team
Bobby Ryan	1	#2	Mighty Ducks of Anaheim	Detroit Honeybaked
Justin Abdelkader	2	#42	Detroit Red Wings	Detroit Honeybaked
Tom Fritsche	2	#47	Colorado Avalanche	Cleveland Barons
T. J. Hensick	3	#88	Colorado Avalanche	Detroit Honeybaked
Patrick Davis	4	#99	New Jersey Devils	Detroit Belle Tire
Jared Boll	4	#101	Columbus Blue Jackets	Team Illinois
Nathan Davis	4	#913	Chicago Blackhawks	Cleveland Barons
Nathan Gerbe	5	#142	Buffalo Sabres	Detroit Honeybaked
Justin Mercier	6	#168	Colorado Avalanche	Cleveland Barons
Ryan Maki	6	#176	Nashville Predators	Detroit Honeybaked
Ryan McGinnis	6	#184	Los Angeles Kings	Detroit Honeybaked
Kyle Lawson	7	#198	Carolina Hurricanes	Detroit Honeybaked
Matt Clackson	7	#215	Philadelphia Flyers	Pittsburgh Hornets
Pat McGann	7	#223	Dallas Stars	Team Illinois
Zach Bearson	7	#224	Florida Panthers	Team Illinois
2006
Player	Round	Overall	NHL team	MWEHL Team
Trevor Lewis	1	#17	Los Angeles Kings	Detroit Honeybaked
Mark Mitera	1	#19	Anaheim Ducks	Detroit Little Caesars
Chris Summers	1	#29	Phoenix Coyotes	Detroit Victory Honda
Nigel Williams	2	#51	Colorado Avalanche	Team Illinois
Jeff Zatkoff	4	#74	Los Angeles Kings	Detroit Honeybaked
Ryan Turek	4	#94	St. Louis Blues	Detroit Honeybaked
Brett Bennett	5	#130	Phoenix Coyotes	Detroit Honeybaked
David Meckler	5	#134	Los Angeles Kings	Chicago Young Americans
Erik Condra	7	#211	Ottawa Senators	Detroit Honeybaked
2007
Player	Round	Overall	NHL team	MWEHL Team
Patrick Kane	1	#1	Chicago Blackhawks	Detroit Honeybaked
Ian Cole	1	#18	St. Louis Blues	Detroit Victory Honda
Jim O'Brien	1	#29	Ottawa Senators	Detroit Little Caesars
Bill Sweatt	2	#38	Chicago Blackhawks	Team Illinois
Aaron Palushaj	2	#44	St. Louis Blues	Detroit Honeybaked
Jeremy Smith	2	#54	Nashville Predators	Detroit Compuware
Josh Unice	3	#86	Chicago Blackhawks	Detroit Victory Honda
Corey Tropp	3	#89	Buffalo Sabres	Detroit Belle Tire
Steven Kampfer	4	#93	Anaheim Ducks	Detroit Little Caesars
Alec Martinez	4	#95	Los Angeles Kings	Detroit Honeybaked
Matt Rust	4	#101	Florida Panthers	Detroit Honeybaked
Ben Ryan	4	#114	Nashville Predators	Detroit Victory Honda
John Albert	6	#175	Atlanta Thrashers	Cleveland Barons
Brad Phillips	7	#182	Philadelphia Flyers	Detroit Honeybaked
C. J. Severyn	7	#186	Calgary Flames	Pittsburgh Hornets
Trevor Nill	7	#190	St. Louis Blues	Detroit Compuware
2008
Player	Round	Overall	NHL team	MWEHL Team
Robert Czarnik	3	#63	Los Angeles Kings	Detroit Honeybaked
A. J. Jenks	4	#100	Florida Panthers	Detroit Honeybaked
David Wohlberg	6	#172	New Jersey Devils	Detroit Honeybaked
Tommy Wingels	6	#177	San Jose Sharks	Team Illinois
Zach Redmond	7	#184	Atlanta Thrashers	Detroit Compuware
2009
Player	Round	Overall	NHL team	MWEHL Team
John Moore	1	#21	Columbus Blue Jackets	Chicago Mission
Chris Brown	2	#36	Phoenix Coyotes	Detroit Honeybaked
Drew Shore	2	#44	Florida Panthers	Detroit Honeybaked
Kenny Ryan	2	#50	Toronto Maple Leafs	Detroit Honeybaked
Kevin Lynch	2	#56	Columbus Blue Jackets	Detroit Honeybaked
Patrick Wey	4	#115	Washington Capitals	Pittsburgh Hornets
Anthony Hamburg	7	#193	Minnesota Wild	Dallas Stars
Paul Phillips	7	#195	Chicago Blackhawks	Chicago Fury
2010
Player	Round	Overall	NHL team	MWEHL Team
Jack Campbell	1	#11	Dallas Stars	Detroit Honeybaked
Cam Fowler	1	#12	Anaheim Ducks	Detroit Honeybaked
Austin Watson	1	#18	Nashville Predators	Detroit Compuware
Beau Bennett	1	#20	Pittsburgh Penguins	LA Jr. Kings
Jon Merrill	2	#38	New Jersey Devils	Detroit Honeybaked
Jason Zucker	2	#59	Minnesota Wild	Detroit Compuware
Stephen Johns	2	#60	Chicago Blackhawks	Pittsburgh Hornets
Bryan Rust	3	#80	Pittsburgh Penguins	Detroit Honeybaked
Justin Florek	5	#135	Boston Bruins	Marquette Electricians
Kevin Gravel	5	#148	Los Angeles Kings	Marquette Electricians
Kevin Lind	6	#177	Anaheim Ducks	Chicago Mission
Bryce Aneloski	7	#196	Ottawa Senators	Team Illinois
Luke Moffatt	7	#197	Colorado Avalanche	Detroit Compuware
Chris Crane	7	#200	San Jose Sharks	Detroit Honeybaked
Zach Trotman	7	#210	Boston Bruins	Detroit Victory Honda
2011
Player	Round	Overall	NHL team	MWEHL Team
J. T. Miller	1	#15	New York Rangers	Pittsburgh Hornets
Rocco Grimaldi	2	#33	Florida Panthers	Detroit Little Caesars
John Gibson	2	#39	Anaheim Ducks	Pittsburgh Hornets
Brandon Saad	2	#43	Chicago Blackhawks	Pittsburgh Hornets
Vincent Trocheck	3	#64	Florida Panthers	Pittsburgh Hornets
T. J. Tynan	3	#66	Columbus Blue Jackets	Chicago Mission
Robbie Russo	4	#95	New York Islanders	Chicago Mission
Josiah Didier	4	#97	Montreal Canadiens	Colorado Thunderbirds
Michael Mersch	4	#110	Los Angeles Kings	Team Illinois
Blake Pietila	5	#129	New Jersey Devils	Detroit Compuware
Sean Kuraly	5	#133	San Jose Sharks	Ohio Jr. Blue Jackets
Shane McColgan	5	#134	New York Rangers	LA Jr. Kings
Garret Sparks	7	#190	Toronto Maple Leafs	Chicago Mission
Zac Larraza	7	#196	Phoenix Coyotes	P.F. Chang's
Alex Broadhurst	7	#199	Chicago Blackhawks	Chicago Mission
Ryan Dzingel	7	#204	Ottawa Senators	Team Illinois
Garrett Haar	7	#207	Washington Capitals	Russell Stover Stars
2012
Player	Round	Overall	NHL team	MWEHL Team
Alex Galchenyuk	1	#3	Montreal Canadiens	Chicago Young Americans
Jacob Trouba	1	#9	Winnipeg Jets	Detroit Compuware
Jordan Schmaltz	1	#25	St. Louis Blues	Chicago Mission
Henrik Samuelsson	1	#27	Phoenix Coyotes	P.F. Chang's
Nicolas Kerdiles	2	#36	Anaheim Ducks	LA Selects
Patrick Sieloff	2	#42	Calgary Flames	Detroit Compuware
Ben Johnson	3	#90	New Jersey Devils	Detroit Little Caesars
Brady Vail	4	#94	Montreal Canadiens	Detroit Compuware
Thomas Di Pauli	4	#100	Washington Capitals	Chicago Mission
Austin Wuthrich	4	#107	Washington Capitals	Team Illinois
Jaccob Slavin	4	#120	Carolina Hurricanes	Colorado Thunderbirds
Logan Nelson	5	#133	Buffalo Sabres	Russell Stover Stars
Connor Carrick	5	#137	Washington Capitals	Chicago Fury
Garret Ross	5	#139	Chicago Blackhawks	Detroit Victory Honda
John McCarron	6	#153	Edmonton Oilers	Detroit Honeybaked
Riley Barber	6	#167	Washington Capitals	Detroit Compuware
Vinnie Hinostroza	6	#169	Chicago Blackhawks	Chicago Mission
Matthew Deblouw	7	#186	Calgary Flames	Detroit Little Caesars
Colton Hargrove	7	#205	Boston Bruins	St. Louis Amateur Blues
Jaycob Megna	7	#210	Anaheim Ducks	Team Illinois
2013
Player	Round	Overall	NHL team	MWEHL Team
Seth Jones	1	#4	Nashville Predators	Dallas Stars
Kerby Rychel	1	#19	Columbus Blue Jackets	Detroit Belle Tire
Michael McCarron	1	#25	Montreal Canadiens	Detroit Honeybaked
Ryan Hartman	1	#30	Chicago Blackhawks	Chicago Mission
J. T. Compher	2	#35	Buffalo Sabres	Team Illinois
Justin Bailey	2	#52	Buffalo Sabres	Buffalo Regals
Cole Cassels	3	#85	Vancouver Canucks	Ohio Blue Jackets
Michael Downing	4	#97	Florida Panthers	Detroit Victory Honda
Andrew Copp	4	#104	Winnipeg Jets	Detroit Compuware
Zach Pochiro	4	#112	St. Louis Blues	LA Jr. Kings
Tyler Motte	4	#121	Chicago Blackhawks	Detroit Honeybaked
Will Butcher	5	#123	Colorado Avalanche	Madison Capitols
Cal Petersen	5	#129	Buffalo Sabres	Chicago Young Americans
Brendan Burke	6	#163	Phoenix Coyotes	P.F. Chang's
Quentin Shore	6	#168	Ottawa Senators	Colorado Thunderbirds
Anthony Louis	6	#181	Chicago Blackhawks	Team Illinois
David Drake	7	#192	Philadelphia Flyers	Chicago Fury
2014
Player	Round	Overall	NHL team	MWEHL Team
Brendan Perlini	1	#12	Arizona Coyotes	Detroit Belle Tire
Dylan Larkin	1	#15	Detroit Red Wings	Detroit Belle Tire
Sonny Milano	1	#16	Columbus Blue Jackets	Cleveland Barons
Nick Schmaltz	1	#20	Chicago Blackhawks	Chicago Mission
Thatcher Demko	2	#36	Vancouver Canucks	LA Jr. Kings
Alex Nedeljkovic	2	#37	Carolina Hurricanes	Detroit Belle Tire
Josh Jacobs	2	#41	New Jersey Devils	Detroit Belle Tire
Ryan MacInnis	2	#43	Arizona Coyotes	St. Louis AAA Blues
Maxim Letunov	2	#52	St. Louis Blues	Dallas Stars
Johnathan MacLeod	2	#57	Tampa Bay Lightning	Cleveland Barons
Christian Dvorak	2	#58	Arizona Coyotes	Chicago Mission
Brandon Halverson	2	#59	New York Rangers	Oakland Jr. Grizzlies
Connor Chatham	3	#71	New Jersey Devils	St. Louis AAA Blues
Blake Siebenaler	3	#77	Columbus Blue Jackets	Detroit Belle Tire
Louie Belpedio	3	#80	Minnesota Wild	Team Illinois
Matt Iacopelli	3	#83	Chicago Blackhawks	Detroit Belle Tire
Nick Magyar	4	#93	Colorado Avalanche	Cleveland Barons
Chase De Leo	4	#99	Winnipeg Jets	LA Selects Hockey Club
Ryan Mantha	4	#104	Toronto Maple Leafs	Detroit Belle Tire
Zachary Nagelvoort	4	#111	Edmonton Oilers	Detroit Compuware
Dakota Joshua	5	#128	Toronto Maple Leafs	Detroit Little Caesars
Anders Bjork	5	#146	Boston Bruins	Chicago Mission
Christopher Brown	6	#151	Buffalo Sabres	Detroit Belle Tire
Aaron Haydon	6	#154	Dallas Stars	Detroit Belle Tire
Kyle Schempp	6	#155	New York Islanders	Detroit Compuware
Hayden Hawkey	6	#177	Montreal Canadiens	Colorado Thunderbirds
Jared Fiegl	7	#191	Arizona Coyotes	Colorado Rampage
Matt Ustaski	7	#192	Winnipeg Jets	Team Illinois
Dwyer Tschantz	7	#202	St. Louis Blues	Team Comcast
