= Jeff Delaney =

American football player (born 1956)

No. 41, 45, 24, 34
- Position: Safety

Personal information
- Born: December 28, 1956 (age 69); Pittsburgh, Pennsylvania, U.S.
- Listed height: 6 ft 0 in (1.83 m)
- Listed weight: 195 lb (88 kg)

Career information
- High school: Upper St. Clair (Upper St. Clair Township, Pennsylvania)
- College: Pittsburgh
- NFL draft: 1979: 7th round, 190th overall pick

Career history
- Los Angeles Rams (1979–1980); Tampa Bay Buccaneers (1981); Detroit Lions (1981); Baltimore Colts (1982–1983); Pittsburgh Maulers (1984); Denver Gold (1985)

Awards and highlights
- National champion (1976); Second-team All-American (1978); First-team All-East (1978)

Career NFL statistics
- Interceptions: 4
- Fumble recoveries: 3
- Sacks: 1
- Stats at Pro Football Reference

Jeff Delaney (born December 28, 1956) is an American former professional football player who was a safety in the National Football League (NFL). He played college football for the Pittsburgh Panthers.

== Early life ==
Delaney was born in Pittsburgh, Pennsylvania and grew up in the suburb of Upper St. Clair where he attended Upper St. Clair High School. As a senior he helped lead the team to a share of the WPIAL championship after going undefeated in the regular season.

== College career ==
Delaney was a four-year starter for the Pittsburgh Panthers, including Pitt's National Championship team in 1976. Delaney led the Panthers in interceptions as a freshman and as a senior, when he was also named All-Eastern by the Associated Press. He finished his collegiate career with 16 interceptions. Off the field, Delaney was a two time Academic All-America selection and was named a National Scholar Athlete by the National Football Foundation.

== Professional career ==
Delaney was selected 190th overall by the Los Angeles Rams in the seventh round of the 1979 NFL draft. Delaney spent the 1979 season on injured reserve and he played in all 16 of the Rams games in 1980. Delaney was cut by the Rams the next season and was signed by the Tampa Bay Buccaneers. He was released during the season and then signed by the Detroit Lions. Delaney spent the next two seasons with the Baltimore Colts until he was released after the 1983 season. He signed with the Pittsburgh Maulers of the United States Football League in 1984. Delaney played for the Denver Gold in 1985.
