= Jack Maitland =

American football player (born 1948)

No. 23, 40
- Position: Running back

Personal information
- Born: February 8, 1948 (age 78); Pittsburgh, Pennsylvania, U.S.

Career information
- High school: Upper St. Clair (Upper St. Clair Township, Pennsylvania)
- College: Williams
- NFL draft: 1970: 16th round, 408th overall pick

Career history
- Baltimore Colts (1970); New England Patriots (1971–1972)

Awards and highlights
- Super Bowl champion (V)

Career NFL statistics
- Receptions: 14
- Receiving yards: 106
- Rushing attempts: 100
- Rushing yards: 267
- Total TDs: 3
- Games played: 41
- Stats at Pro Football Reference

John Frederick Maitland (born February 8, 1948) is an American former professional football player who was a running back in the National Football League (NFL) in the 1970s He played college football for the Williams Ephs. Maitland's professional career was spent with both the Baltimore Colts and the New England Patriots. He played in and won Super Bowl V with the Colts.

Maitland attended Upper St. Clair High School near Pittsburgh.
