= Upper St. Clair Township, Pennsylvania =

Township in Pennsylvania, US

Upper St. Clair Township, Allegheny County, Pennsylvania
- First Class Township with home rule
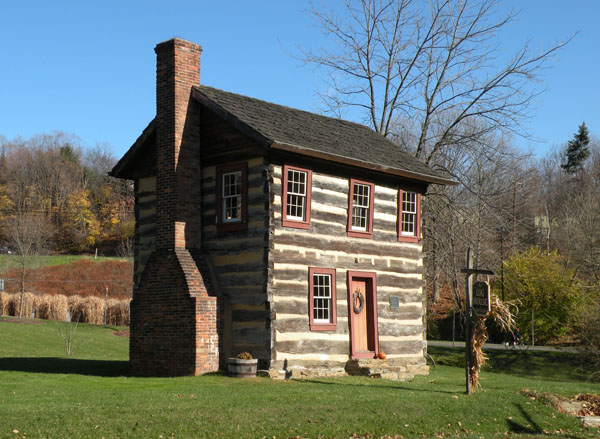
- Fulton Log House in Upper St. Clair Township

- Logo

- Location of Upper St. Clair in Allegheny County, Pennsylvania (right) and of Allegheny County in Pennsylvania (left)
- Coordinates: 40°20′08″N 80°4′47″W
- Country: United States
- State: Pennsylvania
- County: Allegheny
- Settled: 1762
- Incorporated: 1788
- Named for: Arthur St. Clair

Government
  - Type: Board of Commissioners
  - President: Mark D. Christie
  - Twp. Manager: Matthew Serakowski

Area
  - Total: 9.83 sq mi (25.45 km^{2})
  - Land: 9.82 sq mi (25.43 km^{2})
  - Water: 0.0077 sq mi (0.02 km^{2})

Population (2020)
  - Total: 21,160
  - Density: 2,152.59/sq mi (831.12/km^{2})
- Time zone: UTC-5 (Eastern (EST))
  - Summer (DST): UTC-4 (EDT)
- Area code: 412
- FIPS code: 42-003-79274
- Website: http://www.twpusc.org

Upper St. Clair is a township with home rule status in southern Allegheny County, Pennsylvania, United States, located approximately 11 miles (17.7 km) south of Downtown Pittsburgh, in the South Hills region of Allegheny County. As of the 2020 census, the township population was 21,160.

Around 9% of the township's area is dedicated to 14 parks and multiple fields, totaling approximately 733 acres. The township has six borders with neighboring communities, including South Fayette Township to the west, Bridgeville to the northwest, Scott Township and Mt. Lebanon to the north, Bethel Park to the east, and Peters Township in Washington County to the south.

== Etymology ==
St. Clair Township was named after General Arthur St. Clair of Revolutionary War fame, the ninth President of the United States in Congress Assembled. Under his administration as president from February 2, 1787, to October 29, 1787, the Northwest Ordinance and United States Constitution of 1787 were passed.

== History ==
The first European settler in present-day Upper St. Clair was John Fife, who settled near what is now the intersection of Washington and McLaughlin Run roads in 1762.

St. Clair was one of the original townships of Allegheny County, Pennsylvania at the county's creation in 1788. In 1836, the St. Clair Township was divided into two separate townships, Upper St. Clair and Lower St. Clair. The residents of Upper St. Clair formed their township to ensure better government service that could be obtained by separating from the more densely populated northern part of the township. Upper St. Clair Township was further subdivided throughout the 19th and 20th centuries as several parts of the original township separated to form new townships and boroughs. In 1973, Upper St. Clair Township adopted a home rule charter that took effect on January 5, 1976, and is no longer governed by the Pennsylvania Township Code.

The Whiskey Rebellion of 1794 had its roots in Upper St. Clair.

Formed as a volunteer militia company in 1844 by residents of the township, the "St. Clair Guards" later became Company H of the 62nd Pennsylvania Infantry.

The community was home to several mines beginning in the late 19th century. Freehold Real Estate Co. built the first major residential development in March 1913 along Washington Road, which at the time was conveniently close to streetcar service. During the 1930s, Upper St. Clair was recorded as a community within the city which had a school district providing regular nursing services.

== Geography ==
According to the United States Census Bureau, the township has a total area of 9.8 square miles (25 km^{2}), of which 0.10% is water.

== Education ==
Upper St. Clair is served by a K-12 namesake public school district, consisting of three elementary schools (Baker, Eisenhower, and Streams), two middle schools (Boyce and Fort Couch), and a single Upper St. Clair High School. In addition, a church named for St. Louise de Marillac hosts a private Catholic-affiliated school serving from Pre-K to 8th grade. A K-8 school for students with special needs known as the Wesley School also operates within the township.

== Demographics ==
Historical population
Census	Pop.	Note	%±
1850	1,626		—
1860	1,847		13.6%
1870	810		−56.1%
1880	829		2.3%
1890	1,548		86.7%
1900	2,693		74.0%
1910	1,311		−51.3%
1920	1,458		11.2%
1930	1,947		33.5%
1940	2,486		27.7%
1950	3,629		46.0%
1960	8,287		128.4%
1970	15,471		86.7%
1980	19,023		23.0%
1990	19,692		3.5%
2000	20,053		1.8%
2010	19,229		−4.1%
2020	21,160		10.0%

As of the census of 2020, there were 21,160 people and 7,506 households residing in the township. The population density was 2,152.59 inhabitants per square mile (831.12/km^{2}). There were 7,887 housing units. The racial makeup of the township was 88.6% White, 1.0% African American, 0.10% American Indian, 9.4% Asian, 0.0% Pacific Islander, 0.7% from other races, and 5.2% from two or more races. Hispanic or Latino people of any race were 2.7% of the population.

There were 7,506 households, out of which 38.9% had children under the age of 18 living with them, 71.2% were married couples living together, and 17.9% had a female householder with no spouse or partner present. 18.2% of all households were made up of individuals, and 12.6% had someone living alone who was 65 years of age or older.

In the township the population was spread out, with 25.9% under the age of 18, 7.2% were 20 to 29, 19.6% from 25 to 44, 21.8% from 45 to 64, and 19.0% who were 65 years of age or older. The median age was 42.9 years. For every 100 females there were 93.7 males. For every 100 males, there were 96.29 females.

== Government and politics ==
The structure of Upper St. Clair is a managerial government along with an elected Board of Commissioners consisting of seven members. In a Commission/Manager form of government, the main responsibility of the Board of Commissioner is to function as a policy-making body of government, while the managerial body is responsible for the administrative functions of the Township.

Matthew R. Serakowski is the current Township Manager and Mark S. Mansfield is the current Assistant Township Manager. The elected Board of Commissioners are Mark D. Christie (President), Nicholas J. Seitanakis (Vice President), Russell Del Re, C. Elise Logan, Robert W. Orchowski, Daniel R. Paoly, and Ronald J. Pardini.

Presidential Elections Results
Year	Republican	Democratic	Third Parties
2024	LOST	WON	LOST
2020	46% 6,380	53% 7,353	1% 173
2016	52% 6,064	48% 5.618	1% 76
2012	62% 7,388	37% 4,468	1% 87

== Notable people ==
- Sean Casey, former Major League Baseball first baseman, current baseball analyst for MLB Network
- Stephen Chbosky, novelist, screenwriter, and film director best known for the coming-of-age novel The Perks of Being a Wallflower
- Dave Giusti, former American Major League baseball pitcher, chiefly for the Pittsburgh Pirates
- Chuck Greenberg, former owner of the Texas Rangers and Altoona Curve; born and raised in Upper St. Clair; raised his family in the township
- Todd Haley, former head coach of the Kansas City Chiefs; former offensive coordinator of the Pittsburgh Steelers, Arizona Cardinals, and Cleveland Browns.
- Tunch Ilkin, former NFL player and Steelers broadcaster
- Anthony Jeselnik, stand-up comic
- Sean Lee, former NFL linebacker
- Grant Lewis, former NHL defenseman
- Ryan Malone, former NHL forward and Olympic athlete
- Greg Miller, animator and television director
- Dylan Reese, former NHL defenseman
