= Dentons Cohen & Grigsby =

Law firm

Dentons Cohen & Grigsby P.C.
- Headquarters: EQT Plaza; Pittsburgh, Pennsylvania
- No. of offices: 3
- No. of attorneys: approx. 140
- Major practice areas: General practice
- Key people: Christopher B. Carson, CEO
- Date founded: 1981 (Pittsburgh)
- Founder: Charles C. Cohen
- Company type: Professional corporation
- Website: cohenlaw.com

Dentons Cohen & Grigsby is a United States-based law firm with approximately 140 attorneys, that is affiliated with multinational law firm Dentons. The firm's headquarters are in EQT Plaza in Pittsburgh, Pennsylvania, and it has offices in Naples, Florida and Harrisburg, Pennsylvania. Excluding the broader Dentons organization, Dentons Cohen & Grigsby is the fourth-largest law firm in Pittsburgh by number of attorneys in its Pittsburgh office.

== History ==
=== Founding and expansion ===
The firm was founded as Manion Alder & Cohen in 1981 by Charles Cohen and nine other attorneys, splitting off from the large Pittsburgh-based firm Reed Smith, initially focusing on business law, litigation, and labor and employment law with an emphasis on the middle market and some of Pittsburgh's larger businesses following the region's steel recession. Robert Grigsby, a former judge of the Allegheny County Court of Common Pleas joined the firm in 1985. Prompted by a demand for legal wealth management services in the Florida market, the firm established an office in Naples and, for a time, Bonita Springs. In 1985, some members of the firm split off further to form Manion McDonough & Lucas, which eventually merged into Pittsburgh-based Buchanan Ingersoll & Rooney in 2012.

Dentons Cohen & Grigsby's initial office space was in the Conestoga Building at the corner of Wood Street and Fort Pitt Boulevard in downtown Pittsburgh. The firm later moved to the U.S. Steel Tower, then to CNG Tower, and then to 11 Stanwix Street before returning to its location in EQT Plaza (previously known as CNG Tower). In addition to Manion Alder & Cohen, Dentons Cohen & Grigsby was previously known as Alder, Cohen & Grigsby and eventually Cohen & Grigsby.

Former logo of Cohen & Grigsby, prior to its partnership with Dentons.

On October 8, 2019, Dentons US, Bingham Greenebaum Doll, and Cohen & Grigsby announced a proposed partnership by affiliating with Dentons as part of Dentons' "Project Golden Spike" expansion project in the United States. As of January 2020, Cohen & Grigbsy, P.C. was renamed Dentons Cohen & Grigsby. As part of the firm's affiliation with Dentons and other member firms, Dentons Cohen & Grigsby maintains its own leadership, attorney compensation, and fee structures, and partners are shareholders of the firm and partners of Dentons.

Since its move to Pittsburgh's Cultural District in 2008, the firm has outlined what it calls a "Culture of Performance" by aiming to support the performing arts community in Pittsburgh. The firm hosts an in-house art gallery and is a Presenting Sponsor of the “Trust Presents” series, a programming division of the Pittsburgh Cultural Trust.

Clients of the firm have included Bayer, Giant Eagle, Dietrich Industries, PNC, Eat'n Park, Industrial Scientific Corporation, Wheeling-Pittsburgh Steel, and Volkswagen, and the firm represented Allegheny County and the City of Pittsburgh in its construction of Heinz Field and PNC Park, as well as renovations to the David L. Lawrence Convention Center

=== Immigration controversy ===
In August 2007, Cohen & Grigsby was the object of a congressional investigation and the inauspicious Ethics Dunces Award from ProEthics Ltd. In a video of a marketing seminar, featured speaker and Cohen & Grigsby Marketing director, Lawrence Lebowitz explains methods employers can use to skirt US immigration laws and disqualify American job applicants in favor of hiring foreign workers. Lebowitz coached the audience on how use technicalities to avoid hiring US applicants and hire foreign workers instead.

Our goal is clearly not to find a qualified and interested U.S. worker. And you know, in a sense that may sound funny, but it's what we are trying to do here. We are complying with the law, fully, but our objective is to get this person a greencard." —Lawrence Lebowitz

Norm Matloff, a Computer Science professor with the University of California at Davis, spoke with The Christian Science Monitor, stating that there is nothing new in the video and that he had received a document listing numerous methods to deny employment to U.S. professionals favoring foreign workers. The Programmers Guild could make a short Fair Use video segment before the removal of the entire series from the originally posted YouTube channel. Lou Dobbs reported on the issue and Senator Chuck Grassley and Representative Lamar S. Smith approached the Department of Labor seeking an investigation, and the greencard applications submitted by the firm were re-reviewed by the Department of Labor.

== Notable alumni ==
Attorneys who have practiced at Dentons Cohen & Grigsby or its predecessors include:

- Cathy Bissoon, Judge of the United States District Court for the Western District of Pennsylvania
- Cynthia R. Eddy, Chief Magistrate Judge of the United States District Court for the Western District of Pennsylvania
- Chuck Greenberg, sports attorney and former managing partner and chief executive officer of Major League Baseball's Texas Rangers
- Robert Grigsby, Judge of the Allegheny County Court of Common Pleas
- W. Scott Hardy, Judge of the United States District Court for the Western District of Pennsylvania
- Jacob Rooksby, law professor and dean of Gonzaga University School of Law
