= Jeff Greenberg (sports executive) =

American sports executive (born c.1983)

Detroit Tigers
- Assistant general manager
- Born: c.1983

Teams
- Chicago Cubs (2012–2022); Chicago Blackhawks (2022–2023); Detroit Tigers (2023–present)

Jeffrey Greenberg (born circa 1983) is an American sports executive who currently serves as the assistant general manager for the Detroit Tigers of Major League Baseball (MLB). He has previously worked in the front offices of the Chicago Cubs of MLB and the Chicago Blackhawks of the National Hockey League (NHL).

== Biography ==
Greenberg grew up in the South Hills of Pittsburgh, Pennsylvania. He graduated from Upper St. Clair High School, where he played for the ice hockey team. He attended the University of Pennsylvania, and played hockey as a club sport. He was an intern for the Pittsburgh Pirates of Major League Baseball (MLB) during his undergraduate studies. He graduated from Pennsylvania in 2008 and Columbia Law School in 2011. Greenberg interned for MLB's Arizona Diamondbacks and MLB's executive office during law school.

Greenberg joined MLB's Chicago Cubs in 2012 as an intern in the baseball operations department. He became director of baseball operations in 2018 and director of professional scouting in 2019. In 2020, the Cubs promoted him to assistant general manager.

In April 2022, the Chicago Blackhawks of the National Hockey League hired Greenberg as their associate general manager. In September 2023, the Detroit Tigers of MLB hired Greenberg as their general manager.

== Personal life ==
Greenberg is the son of Chuck Greenberg. His wife, Erin, is a nurse. They have two sons and a daughter.
