= Justin Bailey =

American ice hockey player (born 1995)

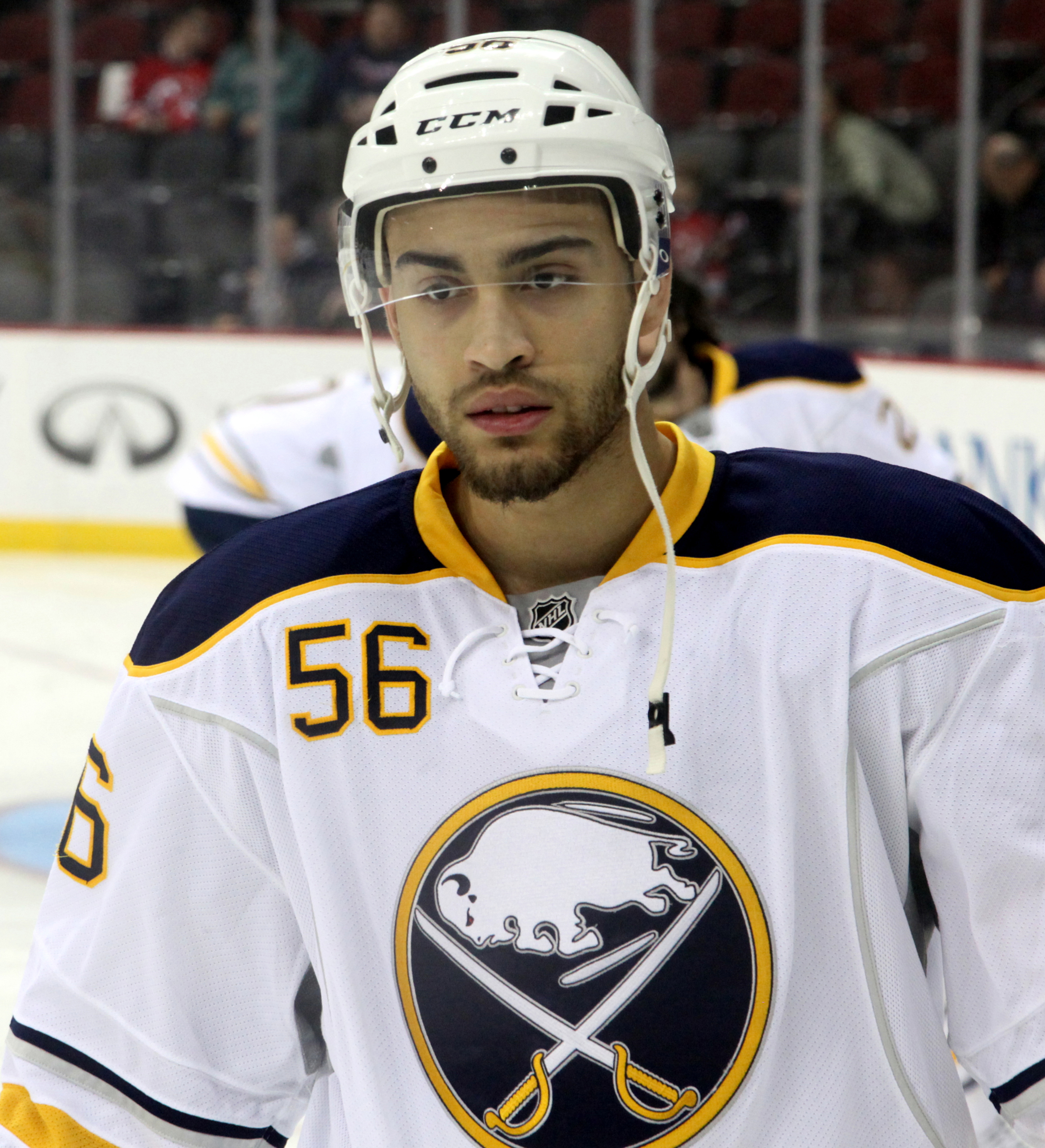
- Bailey with the Buffalo Sabres in 2016
- Born: July 1, 1995 (age 31) Buffalo, New York, U.S.
- Height: 6 ft 4 in (193 cm)
- Weight: 214 lb (97 kg; 15 st 4 lb)
- Position: Right wing
- Shoots: Right
- KHL team Former teams: Barys Astana; Buffalo Sabres; Philadelphia Flyers; Vancouver Canucks; San Jose Sharks
- NHL draft: 52nd overall, 2013; Buffalo Sabres
- Playing career: 2015–present

Justin Bailey (born July 1, 1995) is an American professional ice hockey forward who is currently under contract with Barys Astana in the Kontinental Hockey League (KHL).

== Early life ==
Bailey was born in Buffalo, New York. He grew up in nearby Williamsville, in the same apartment complex as several members of the Buffalo Sabres of the National Hockey League (NHL). His father Carlton Bailey was a gridiron football player who served as a linebacker for the Buffalo Bills of the National Football League (NFL). Carlton played with the Bills for five seasons and scored the touchdown that helped take the team to Super Bowl XXVI in 1992. Bailey's parents separated when he was young, and he lived with his mother, Karen Buscaglia, while maintaining contact with his father during birthdays or holidays.

Bailey's minor ice hockey career began with the Buffalo Regals of the Midwest Elite Hockey League (MEHL). A shoulder injury limited Bailey to 22 games during the 2010–11 MEHL season, during which he scored 13 goals and nine assists. Bailey also helped take the Regals to the state championship finals, where they faced the Long Island Royals and coach Pat LaFontaine, who was intrigued both by Bailey's size and by his talent.

== Playing career ==
=== Buffalo Sabres ===
Bailey was selected by his hometown team, the Buffalo Sabres in the 2nd round (52nd overall) of the 2013 NHL entry draft.

Bailey signed a three-year entry-level contract with the Sabres on November 2, 2014. He was recalled to the Sabres from the American Hockey League's Rochester Americans on February 10, 2016, and made his NHL debut on February 11. He was reassigned to Rochester on February 18, only to be recalled again three days later following an injury to Ryan O'Reilly. He scored his first NHL goal on January 3, 2017, against Henrik Lundqvist and the New York Rangers.

During the 2017–18 season, Bailey was suspended one game for a high hit on Reid McNeil during a game against the Syracuse Crunch in March. However, he was called up to the NHL on March 14, 2018, a day before he was set to serve his suspension. He was set to serve his suspension once he is sent back to the AHL. He was reassigned to the AHL on March 27, 2018, after playing in 5 games.

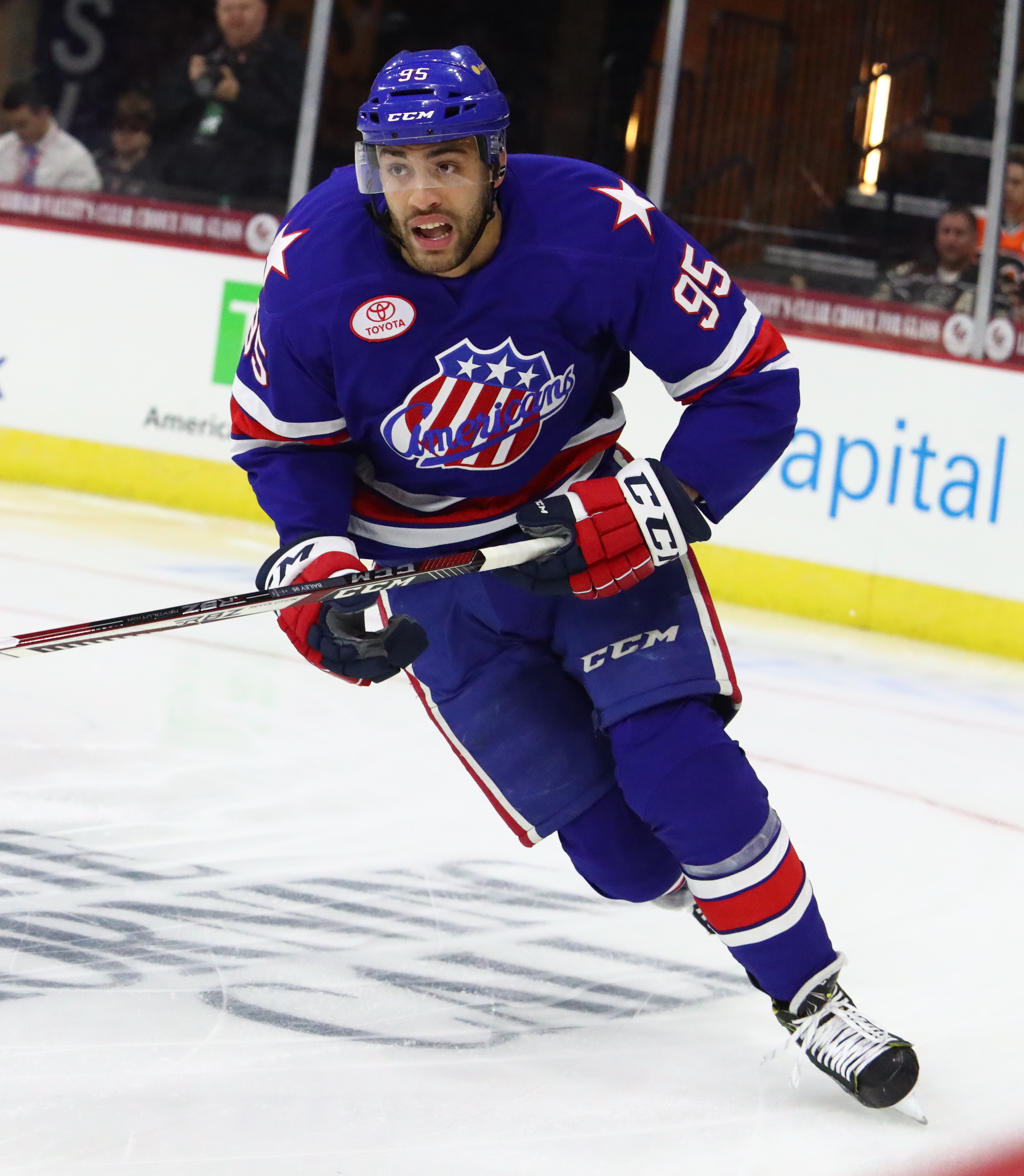
Bailey with the Rochester Americans in 2017.

=== Philadelphia Flyers ===
The Sabres traded Bailey to the Philadelphia Flyers on January 17, 2019, in exchange for forward Taylor Leier. He was assigned to the Lehigh Valley Phantoms, the Flyers' AHL affiliate, playing on a line with Mikahil Vorobyev and Colin McDonald for the Flyers to assess whether there was a position for him in their NHL roster. He was recalled to the Flyers on February 10 under suspicion that, should Wayne Simmonds be traded as part of the February 25 trading deadline, Bailey would take his position in the roster. Even after Simmonds was traded to the Nashville Predators, however, Bailey struggled to remain in the Flyers lineup and spent most of his time in Lehigh. Between February 10 and April 11, Bailey was sent either up or down between the two teams 10 times. His final recall came on March 20, and he finished out the season with the Flyers. Altogether, he played 11 games for Philadelphia and 17 for Lehigh Valley. The Flyers did not extend a qualifying offer to Bailey at the end of the season, making him an unrestricted free agent.

=== Vancouver Canucks ===
On July 4, 2019, Bailey signed to a one-year, two-way contract with the Vancouver Canucks.

On January 30, 2020, Bailey was called up by the Vancouver Canucks from the Utica Comets following an injury to Tyler Motte. He appeared in two games before the pause of the 2019–20 season.

After playing just 3 games, Bailey was injured on February 11, 2021. The injury required surgery causing him to miss the remainder of the season.

=== Edmonton Oilers ===
As a free agent from the Canucks, Bailey failed to gain interest in an NHL contract before opting to sign a one-year AHL deal with the Bakersfield Condors on September 8, 2022. In the 2022–23 season, Bailey recorded 10 points through his first 16 games with the Condors leading him to sign a one-year, two-way contract with NHL affiliate, the Edmonton Oilers, on January 6, 2023. He remained with the Condors for the duration of his contract, posting 32 points through 58 regular season games.

=== San Jose Sharks ===
As a free agent after his contract with the Oilers, Bailey remained un-signed over the summer before joining the San Jose Sharks 2023 training camp. On October 12, 2023, he was signed by AHL affiliate, the San Jose Barracuda to a one-year contract. Adding 6 goals and 11 points through 16 games, for the second consecutive season, Bailey earned an NHL contract during the season, in signing a one-year, two-way contract with the Sharks on November 27, 2023. With the Sharks suffering a rash of injuries, Bailey was immediately recalled and made his Sharks debut on the same day, marking his return to the NHL by adding a primary assist on the game-winning goal of a 2–1 victory over the Washington Capitals. On June 30, 2024, he re-signed with the Sharks, signing a one-year contract.

=== Anaheim Ducks ===
Midway through his second season in the Sharks organization, Bailey was traded to the Anaheim Ducks on January 22, 2025, in exchange for Pavol Regenda. As a free agent at the conclusion of the season, Bailey remained within the Ducks organization in signing a one-year contract with AHL affiliate, the San Diego Gulls, on July 14, 2025.

=== Barys Astana ===
After two seasons within the Ducks organization, having played exclusively with the Gulls, Bailey left as a free agent to sign a one-year contract abroad with Kazakhstani-based club, Barys Astana of the KHL, on July 22, 2026.

== Personal life ==
He is the son of former Buffalo Bills linebacker Carlton Bailey and was raised by his mother, Karen Buscaglia.

== Career statistics ==
=== Regular season and playoffs ===
			Regular season					Playoffs
Season	Team	League	GP	G	A	Pts	PIM	GP	G	A	Pts	PIM
2010–11	Buffalo Regals 16U AAA	T1EHL	12	4	1	5	0	—	—	—	—	—
2011–12	Long Island Royals 16U AAA	AYHL	22	21	13	34	52	—	—	—	—	—
2011–12	Indiana Ice	USHL	2	1	0	1	0	—	—	—	—	—
2012–13	Kitchener Rangers	OHL	57	17	19	36	34	10	1	2	3	4
2013–14	Kitchener Rangers	OHL	54	25	18	43	20	—	—	—	—	—
2014–15	Kitchener Rangers	OHL	35	22	19	41	32	—	—	—	—	—
2014–15	Sault Ste. Marie Greyhounds	OHL	22	12	16	28	12	14	7	7	14	6
2015–16	Rochester Americans	AHL	70	20	25	45	16	—	—	—	—	—
2015–16	Buffalo Sabres	NHL	8	0	0	0	2	—	—	—	—	—
2016–17	Rochester Americans	AHL	52	23	13	36	35	—	—	—	—	—
2016–17	Buffalo Sabres	NHL	32	2	2	4	4	—	—	—	—	—
2017–18	Rochester Americans	AHL	37	10	5	15	28	3	2	0	2	0
2017–18	Buffalo Sabres	NHL	12	3	1	4	2	—	—	—	—	—
2018–19	Rochester Americans	AHL	37	9	11	20	18	—	—	—	—	—
2018–19	Lehigh Valley Phantoms	AHL	17	6	2	8	12	—	—	—	—	—
2018–19	Philadelphia Flyers	NHL	11	0	1	1	2	—	—	—	—	—
2019–20	Utica Comets	AHL	53	28	19	47	39	—	—	—	—	—
2019–20	Vancouver Canucks	NHL	2	0	0	0	0	—	—	—	—	—
2020–21	Vancouver Canucks	NHL	3	0	0	0	2	—	—	—	—	—
2021–22	Abbotsford Canucks	AHL	30	15	12	27	20	—	—	—	—	—
2021–22	Vancouver Canucks	NHL	14	0	0	0	6	—	—	—	—	—
2022–23	Bakersfield Condors	AHL	58	19	13	32	42	2	0	1	1	4
2023–24	San Jose Barracuda	AHL	16	6	5	11	16	—	—	—	—	—
2023–24	San Jose Sharks	NHL	59	5	9	14	6	—	—	—	—	—
2024–25	San Jose Barracuda	AHL	33	7	7	14	26	—	—	—	—	—
2024–25	San Diego Gulls	AHL	35	12	10	22	18	—	—	—	—	—
2025–26	San Diego Gulls	AHL	71	25	17	42	40	2	0	0	0	10
NHL totals			141	10	13	23	24	—	—	—	—	—

=== International ===
Year	Team	Event	Result	GP	G	A	Pts	PIM
2012	United States	IH18	7th	4	2	0	2	2
Junior totals				4	2	0	2	2
