= Joe David (basketball) =

American basketball executive

Joseph Mark David
- Born: Joseph Mark David
- Education: University of Pittsburgh; Temple University
- Occupations: Physical therapist, basketball coach, sports executive
- Title: President of A.S. Pistoia Basket 2000

Joseph Mark David is an American physical therapist, basketball coach, author, investor, and former colliegate basketball player who currently serves as the president and majority owner of Italian professional basketball club A.S. Pistoia Basket 2000.

== Early life and education ==
David was raised in the South Hills suburbs of Pittsburgh, Pennsylvania and in Terre Haute, Indiana. He attended Upper St. Clair High School before enrolling at the University of Pittsburgh, where he played basketball. and graduated summa cum laude with two bachelor's degrees, one in physical therapy and one in neuroscience. Following his time at the University of Pittsburgh, he would go on to receive his Doctorate of Physical Therapy from Temple University.

David would later on establish the Joseph M. David Endowed Scholarship, which supports students in the University of Pittsburgh's Doctor of Physical Therapy program.

== College basketball ==
David played college basketball for the Pittsburgh Panthers from 1982 to 1986. A 6-foot-5 guard, he appeared in 113 games during his four-year career and made 31 starts. As a freshman during the 1982–83 season, David appeared in 27 games and averaged 4.5 points and 1.5 rebounds per game. He followed with 2.7 points and 0.7 rebounds per game in 1983–84. During his junior season in 1984–85, he averaged 4.7 points, 1.4 rebounds and 1.5 assists per game while starting 13 of 28 games. In his senior season in 1985–86, David started 18 of 29 games and averaged 4.6 points, 2.1 rebounds and 3.6 assists per game. He finished his collegiate career with 467 points, 160 rebounds and 187 assists.

During his career, he was named Big East Scholar-Athlete of the Year in 1984–85 and was selected to the Academic All-Big East team in three consecutive seasons from 1983–84 through 1985–86. In 1985–86, he was named a second-team Academic All-American and received an NCAA Postgraduate Scholarship.

== Career ==
=== Physical therapy ===
In 1987, David founded David Physical Therapy & Sports Medicine Center, a clinic specializing in orthopedic rehabilitation, athletic injury recovery, and sports performance training. The practice became a regional leader in integrating clinical physical therapy with sports science methods for local athletes and teams. David is a board-certified specialist in orthopedic physical therapy and a Certified Strength and Conditioning Specialist (CSCS).

=== Coaching ===
David became the head basketball coach at Mt. Lebanon High School in 2001 and compiled a 444–200 record during his tenure. He won three WPIAL championships and led the Blue Devils to multiple PIAA state tournament appearances before stepping down as head coach in 2026.

In 2024, David published his first book, The Bora Defensive System: A Maximum Disruption Defense with Unique Actions and Concepts That Will Help You Win More Games, which served as a guide to his tactical approach to winning more basketball games as a basketball coach.

=== Pistoia Basket 2000 ===
David became involved with A.S. Pistoia Basket 2000 as part of an American investment group associated with the club. In March 2025, he became president of the club after Ronald Rowan resigned from the position.

David initially injected an investment of €250,000 to Pistoia Basket when the club was facing an immediate financial crisis. Following his appointment as president, David began a restructuring of the club's board and ownership structure. In May 2025, Pistoia Basket announced that Rowan was no longer affiliated with the club.

Under David's leadership, Pistoia pursued a financial and organizational rebuilding program. In February 2026, David stated that the ownership group had invested approximately $4 million into the club and that he had personally contributed more than $2 million. Following his contributions, David said the club's financial position had improved substantially following the restructuring and identified returning Pistoia to Serie A as a long-term objective.

David has also promoted initiatives and programs beyond the first team, including local community programs, renovation of basketball courts in Tuscany, relationships with local schools, and potential exchanges involving athletes and students from U.S. colleges. In 2026, Pistoia announced Lumos as its title and first sponsor for the 2026–27 season as part of the club's broader commercial and organizational development.

== Personal life ==
David resides in Mt. Lebanon, Pennsylvania, with his family. His clinic remains family-run, with several relatives involved in both administrative and clinical roles.
