= Jacob Rooksby =

American law professor

Dean of University of Richmond School of Law
- Incumbent
- Assumed office 2026

Personal details
- Education: College of William and Mary (A.B.); University of Virginia (J.D., M.Ed., Ph.D.)

Jacob Rooksby is the dean of the University of Richmond School of Law, assuming the role in 2026. He previously served as dean at the Gonzaga University School of Law and as an associate dean of administration and associate professor of law at Duquesne University School of Law in Pittsburgh, Pennsylvania. Rooskby also worked in the private sector before entering academia, as an attorney at McGuireWoods, LLP and Cohen & Grigsby.

== Early life and career ==
Rooksby is a graduate of the College of William and Mary and University of Virginia. He earned a Master of Education, Juris Doctor, and Ph.D. at University of Virginia (and University of Virginia School of Law). His academic writing has appeared in multiple scholarly law journals including the Harvard Journal of Law & Technology and the Yale Journal of Law and Technology.

Rooksby received the Dr. John and Liz Murray Award for Excellence in Faculty Scholarship at Duquesne University School of Law, its highest faculty honor. He is a past president of the Pittsburgh Intellectual Property Law Association and listed among Pittsburgh's 40 Under 40 Honorees. Rooksby's research has focused on issues of intellectual property law and higher education law. He is also a member of the American Law Institute.

== Published works ==
- Rooksby, Jacob (2016), The Branding of the American Mind: How Universities Capture, Manage, and Monetize Intellectual Property and Why It Matters, Johns Hopkins University Press, ISBN 978-1-421-42080-6.
- Rooksby, Jacob (2019), The Law of Higher Education (6th ed.), Wiley, ISBN 978-1-119-55118-8.
- Rooksby, Jacob (2020), Research Handbook on intellectual Property and Technology Transfer, Edward Elgar Publishing.
