= Nora Barry Fischer =

American judge (born 1951)

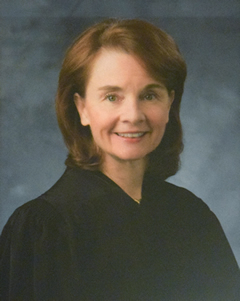

Senior Judge of the United States District Court for the Western District of Pennsylvania
- Incumbent
- Assumed office June 13, 2019

Judge of the United States District Court for the Western District of Pennsylvania
- In office April 2, 2007 – June 13, 2019
- Appointed by: George W. Bush
- Preceded by: Robert J. Cindrich
- Succeeded by: W. Scott Hardy

Personal details
- Born: Nora Barry Homestead, Pennsylvania
- Education: Saint Mary's College (BA); University of Notre Dame (JD)

Nora Barry Fischer (born in 1951) is a senior United States district judge of the United States District Court for the Western District of Pennsylvania.

== Early life and education ==
Fischer was born Nora Barry in Homestead, Pennsylvania, to Michael T. Barry and Olga Stipetich Barry, both first generation United States citizens. She is one of eight siblings, all of whom graduated from college. Fischer attended Saint Mary's College, where she studied history and humanistic studies. As part of her undergraduate education she attended L'Universite Catholique (see Catholic University of the West) located in Angers, France for one academic year. She graduated with her Bachelor of Arts degree in 1973 and later from Notre Dame Law School with a Juris Doctor in 1976.

== Legal career ==
Following law school graduation, she worked as a legal editor at Callaghan & Company, in part working on revisions to McQuillin on Municipal Corporations and to Fletchers Cyclopedia on Corporations. Fischer returned to Pittsburgh in 1977 where she became the first female associate at Meyer Darragh Buckler Bebenek & Eck, an insurance defense litigation firm. In 1980, Fischer was named the first female junior partner at Meyer Darragh Buckler Bebenek & Eck and in 1982, its first female senior partner.

In 1992, she joined the firm of Pietragallo Bosick & Gordon as an equity partner. She served the firm as administrative partner and as a practice group leader. Her practice at both Meyer Darragh and PB&G was litigation based, as she handled product liability, toxic tort, insurance coverage and bad faith as well as municipal liability and civil rights litigation.

== Federal judicial career ==
On the recommendation of Senator Arlen Specter, Fischer was nominated to the United States District Court for the Western District of Pennsylvania by President George W. Bush on January 9, 2007, to a seat vacated Robert J. Cindrich, who resigned. Fischer was confirmed by the Senate on February 14, 2007, on an unopposed 96-0 Senate vote and received her commission on April 2, 2007. She assumed senior status on June 13, 2019.

== Notable cases ==
In October 2010, Fischer sentenced a man from New Castle, Pennsylvania, to 30 years in prison for transporting and receiving child pornography.

In 2012 and 2013, she upheld a verdict and damages award of $1.17 billion in a patent infringement suit against Marvell Technology Group.

== Personal ==
Fischer is married to Dr. Donald R. Fischer. They are the parents of three grown children.

Legal offices
| Preceded by Robert J. Cindrich | Judge of the United States District Court for the Western District of Pennsylvania; 2007–2019 | Succeeded by W. Scott Hardy |
