= Upper St. Clair School District =

School district in Pennsylvania

Coordinates: 40.334954°N 80.071824°W

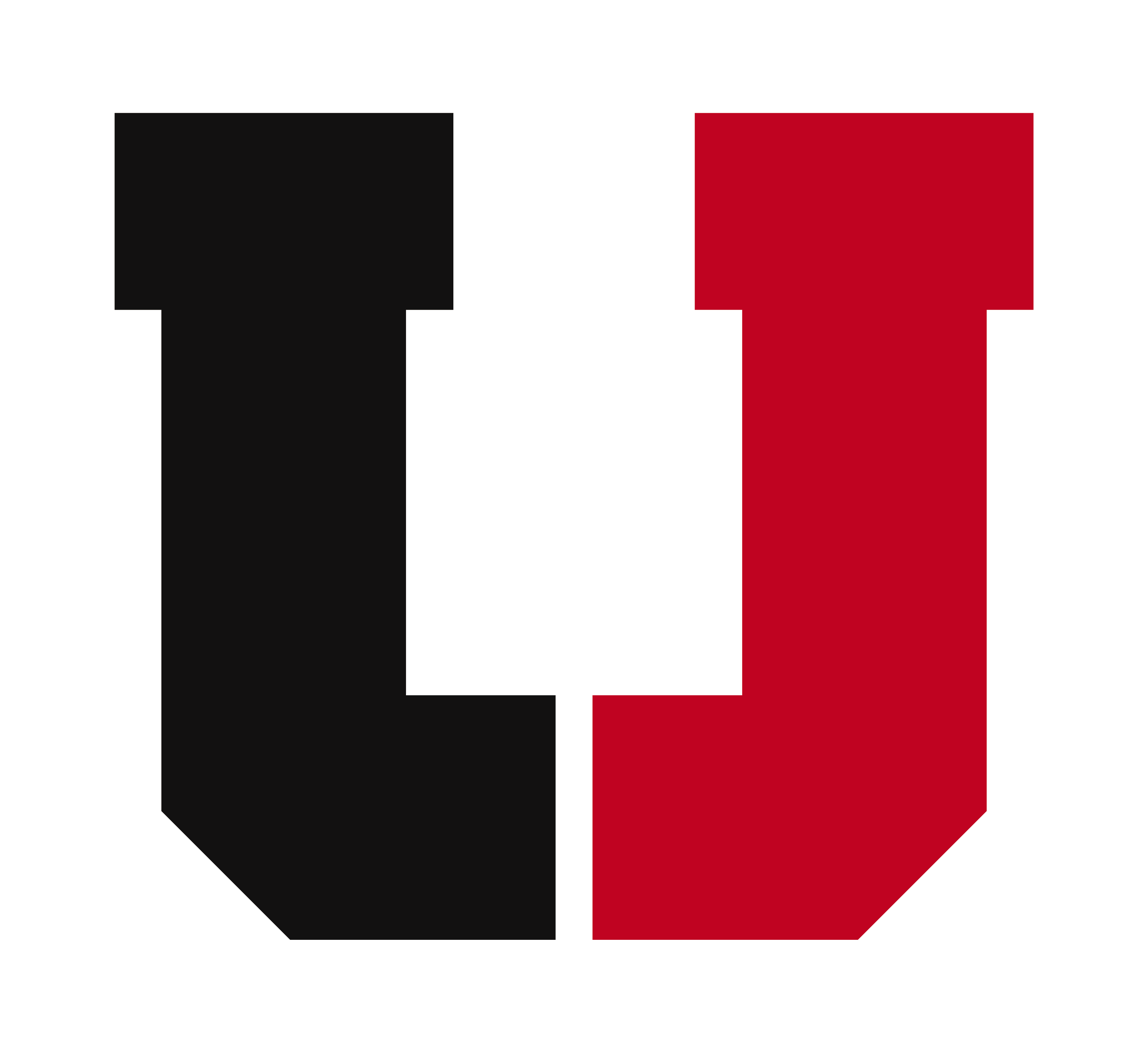
- Upper St. Clair's primary logo: "The U"

- Map of Allegheny County, Pennsylvania school districts

Address
- 1775 McLaughlin Run Road Upper St. Clair, Allegheny, Pennsylvania, 15241; United States

District information
- Type: Public
- Grades: K–12
- Superintendent: Dr. John Rozzo
- Deputy superintendent(s): Amy Pfender
- Chair of the board: Jennifer A. Schnore
- Schools: 6
- Budget: $100,255,600
- NCES District ID: 4224570

Students and staff
- Students: 3,974
- Teachers: 279
- Student–teacher ratio: 14:1
- Athletic conference: WPIAL
- District mascot: Panther
- Colors: Black, White, & Red

Other information
- Website: https://www.uscsd.k12.pa.us/

The Upper St. Clair School District is a K–12 public school district serving the Pittsburgh, Pennsylvania suburb of Upper St. Clair. The district encompasses 9.83 mi^{2} (25.45 km^{2}) and shares its boundaries with its namesake township. Upper Saint Clair School District features three elementary schools for grades K–4:(Albert F.) Baker Elementary School, Eisenhower Elementary School, and Streams Elementary School. The district also includes two middle schools, Boyce Middle School and Fort Couch Middle School. Boyce Middle School contains the 5th and 6th grades while Fort Couch Middle School contains the 7th and 8th grades. Fort Couch MS is the oldest running school of the school district. Upper St. Clair High School hosts the 9th through 12th grades. According to 2020 census data, the district serves a resident population of 21,160.

The district and its constituent schools are commonly interchangeably referred to as Upper Saint Clair, Upper St. Clair, Saint Clair, St. Clair, and USC. The abbreviation "USC" is the most used unofficial name within the district.

The district is nationally recognized for its academic success and extracurricular programs. The district has received numerous awards and distinctions including 13 National Blue Ribbon Awards, being named the number one public school district in Pennsylvania, and Upper St. Clair High School being named the 113th among high schools nationally.

== History ==
Upper Saint Clair was founded in 1762 by a settler named John Fife, a Scotsman that had come from Virginia. At the time, it was part of Yohogania County District of West Augustia,in Virginia while also being claimed by Pennsylvania. This dispute was solved and given to Pennsylvania. At the time, Allegheny Country included Washington and Westmoreland. The township included Scott Township, Mt. Lebanon, South Park, Bridgeville, Castle Shannon, Crafton, Dormont, Greentree, Ingram, part of Carnegie, and the 9 wards of the city of Pittsburgh. Later, this large township was divided into Upper and Lower Saint Clair (No longer existent). Two more townships were made inside USC, Scott Township in 1861 and Snowden in 1845. Bridgeville sepearated in 1861, forming the boundaries that exist today.
