= Upper St. Clair High School =

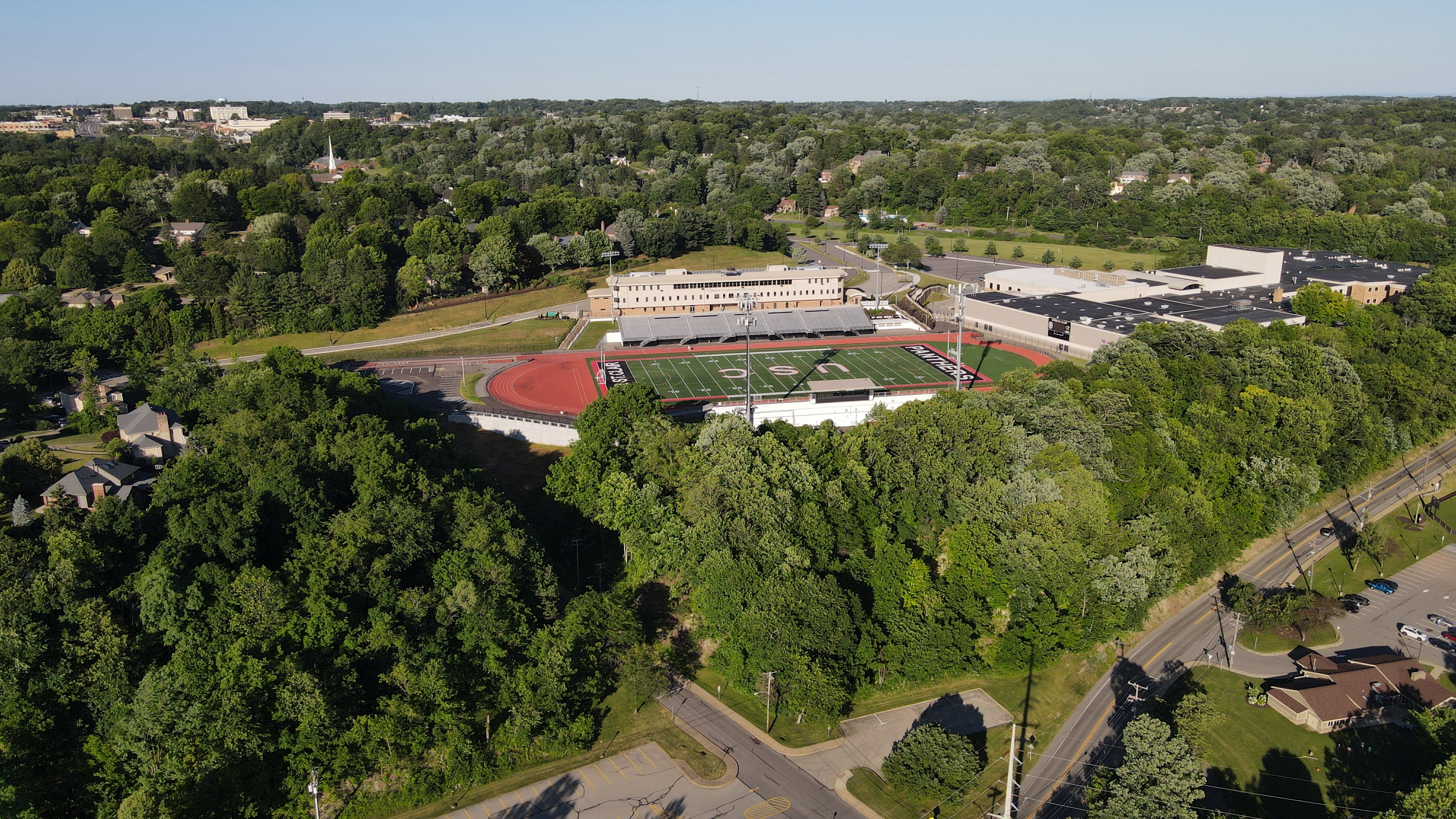
- Upper St. Clair High School in June 2022

Location
- 1825 McLaughlin Run Road; Upper St. Clair, Pennsylvania 15241; United States; 40.33500°N 80.07083°W

Information
- Type: Public high school
- Motto: Qui non proficit, deficit (Latin: He who does not progress, fails)
- School district: Upper St. Clair School District
- Faculty: 95.60 (on an FTE basis)
- Grades: 9–12
- Enrollment: 1,301 (2023–2024)
- Student to teacher ratio: 13.61
- Colors: Black, white, and red
- Mascot: Panther
- USNWR ranking: 6th in Pittsburgh Region, 17th in Pennsylvania
- Newspaper: The St. Clarion
- Yearbook: Clairvoyant
- Website: uschs.uscsd.k12.pa.us

Upper St. Clair High School (USCHS) is a public secondary school in Upper St. Clair Township, Pennsylvania and the sole high school within the township's namesake school district; the school enrolls students in grades 9–12.

== History ==
Upper St. Clair High School traces its earliest heritage to the late 18th century Higbee School, a one-room log cabin which was the first known school in the area. The first school west of the Alleghenies, Higbee was located on the northeast border of present Upper St. Clair, just south of the current site of the school. .

Upper St. Clair High School was established in 1957, with the creation of a tenth grade class. Prior to 1957, Upper St. Clair students completing the ninth grade at Ft. Couch School were then enrolled as transfer students at neighboring high schools, primarily Mt. Lebanon, with Upper St. Clair Township paying their tuition as out-of-jurisdiction students. When Mt. Lebanon High School, due to crowded conditions, decided to no longer accept Upper St. Clair students, the Upper St. Clair School Board voted to create a high school. Dr. Carl Streams was recruited from Mt. Lebanon to become the new Supervising Principal, and he in turn recruited a high school faculty. One grade was added to Ft. Couch School each year from 1957 through September 1959, when the first high school senior class was enrolled. The inaugural class graduated in June 1960, and numbered 74 students, with most continuing on to college. The Class of 1960 created many of the traditions and artifacts for the high school, including the school colors, alma mater, mascot, yearbook, and school newspaper.

Concurrently, a new high school building was constructed at the northwest corner of the intersection of McLaughlin Run and Washington Roads, where formerly the Clifton School had been located. The Class of 1962 graduated from this new building, although they had not attended classes there. With the completion of a new high school building, Ft. Couch School reverted to its earlier status as a junior high school, then a middle school.

During Dr. William Pope's tenure as district superintendent, Upper St. Clair High School was substantially remodeled in 2000. The renovations included replacements of much of the school's aging building; the mechanical systems; and allowed for many technological advancements such as widespread Internet access. The renovations improved the facilities, allowing for a professional-sized theater, two full-sized gymnasiums, a weight room, and a racquetball court. Academic facilities were also improved with a 12,500-square-foot (1,160 m^{2}) library at the center of the academic wing. The library was dedicated to Dr. Pope in 2003 upon his retirement.

Beginning around 2015, the school district began implementing a 1:1 iPad program for middle school students and later introduced Chromebooks to both the middle schools and the high school. The high school implemented Securly web filtering and also opened a Square-powered online store for students to purchase additional accessories. Then-technology director Ray Berrot stated that the estimated cost of the program was $136,400 per year.

In 2018, USCSD broke ground on a rebuild of the high school's aquatic facility. The larger of the two new pools houses 8 lanes, and a separate smaller pool accommodates students with special needs. The aquatic facility was part of an overall $22,650,000 capital project program which simultaneously built new office space for the district near the Panther stadium and renovated Boyce Middle School's athletic facilities.

During the COVID-19 pandemic, Upper St. Clair High School through its district was the target of a class action suit regarding the masking policy implemented at schools. On January 10, the school board voted to drop its mask requirement and was subsequently sued by unnamed parents and families in Doe v. Upper St. Clair School District, who allege the schools did not take into account high transmission rates. The suit, fought concurrently with a similar lawsuit targeting North Allegheny's schools, succeeded on January 22, and the mask policy was reimplemented the following Monday by order of federal judge William S. Stickman IV. However, Stickman's decision was overruled the following March by the Third Circuit Court of Appeals, as the lack of a high transmission rate mooted the primary complaint of the suit.

== Academics ==
USCHS students may choose to enroll in Advanced Placement (AP) courses to experience college-level academics and potentially earn college credit for passing AP exams. As of 2023, USCHS has 52% of all students pass at least one AP Exam, with 57% enrolled in AP. This is a decline from a 2009 report found that 62.9% of 12th graders enrolled in at least one Advanced Placement (AP) course, with 88.9% of those students passing at least one AP exam.

The school also offers an International Baccalaureate (IB) program, offering all three levels of IB. (Note: The three levels of IB are the Primary Years Program (PYP), Middle Years Program (MYP), and Diploma Program (DP).) A 2009 report found that 21.7% of 12th graders had taken and passed at least one IB test. Among participants in the IB program, 84.6% passed at least one IB test. Of the entire 12th grade class surveyed, 3.3% earned an IB diploma.

In standardized testing, Upper St. Clair is well above the state average when it comes to proficiency. 89% of all USCHS students are proficient in Mathematics, 92% are proficient in science, and 96% are proficient in reading. Compared to the rest of the state of Pennsylvania, the school ranks between 26 and 32 percentage points in each of the three areas measured.

The school and district have adopted a policy of not ranking its students. As of 2021, the school has enrolled 1,391 students in its halls, and the high school has a graduation rate of 99%.

Upper St. Clair is also known for its debate team. In 2021, the team ranked as the 38th best in the nation out of 3000 schools by the National Speech and Debate Association; the school improved its rank to 36th in 2022. The Association accredits USC's debate program as among the most prestigious in the nation, and the team additionally the Pennsylvania High School Speech League State Championship in 2022.

=== IB removal controversy ===
An academic controversy during the 2005–2006 school year was the elimination of the International Baccalaureate (IB) program. Members of the new school board elected in 2005 criticized the program as being too costly, a needless duplication of Advanced Placement, and a proponent of "socialist" values. In February 2006 the new school board voted 5–4 to phase out the IB program over two years, allowing only current 11th and 12th grade students to complete requirements. In March 2006, the ACLU filed a lawsuit and an out-of-court settlement was reached in May 2006 with two main stipulations. First, the program was reinstated for a minimum of two years. Second, a nine-month study to determine the value of the IB program was conducted as part of the settlement agreement. The study resulted in a recommendation to retain the IB curriculum.

== Athletics ==
Upper St. Clair High School competes in the Pennsylvania Interscholastic Athletic Association's District 7, commonly referred to as the Western Pennsylvania Interscholastic Athletic League (WPIAL). Sports at St. Clair affiliated with WPIAL include baseball, basketball, cross country, field hockey, football, golf, lacrosse, rifle, soccer, softball, swimming, tennis, track, volleyball, and wrestling, as well as non-WPIAL cheerleading, crew, fencing, and ice hockey. Club teams are usually called the Upper St. Clair Panthers, with the mascot being a black panther. These teams are supported on the campus of the high school Athletic facilities at consisting of two gyms, two indoor swimming pools, and a football stadium surrounding by a track.

The high school has a rivalry with Mt. Lebanon High School, a neighboring high school around 3 miles (5 km) north of Upper St. Clair. Both schools represent strong athletic and academic programs. It is often considered one of western Pennsylvania's most storied rivalries.

=== State team championships ===
Gender	Sport	Year(s)
Girls	Basketball	1999
Boys	Football	1989, 2006
Coed	Rifle	1970
Boys	Soccer	2003, 2004, 2012, 2013
Girls	Tennis	2000, 2001, 2003
Boys	Tennis	2008
Boys	Golf	2013
Boys	Ice Hockey	1980, 1987, 2011
Girls	Soccer	2015

== Arts ==
=== Music and theater ===
The USCHS music program has three components: (1) choral courses, (2) instrumental courses, and (3) extra-curricular activities. The focus of courses is on performance rather than music theory or history.

Choral courses include the elective Men's Ensemble, Women's Choir, Clarion Choir, and Pantheon Choir as well as the selective chamber choir known as the Chanteclairs. Instrumental courses offerings include string and full orchestra, concert band, and jazz band.

The Panther Marching Band holds a two-week training program during the summer to help students prepare for football half-time performances and festivals. In addition, it rehearses after school during the first nine weeks of the school year. The band makes at least one trip each spring to perform at a major festival. In recent years, multiple USCHS students have been accepted into all-state instrumental music ensembles and choirs.

The Upper St. Clair Theater, renovated in 1999, hosts a fall play and spring musical every year, with students filling most of the cast and crew roles. USCHS students perform a musical that are community events.

=== Yearbook ===
The yearbook for Upper St. Clair High School is titled the Clairvoyant, based on a contest held by the class of 1960. The school has contracted with M&M Photography, a local photography studio within the Pittsburgh area, for the exclusive rights to photograph yearbook group photos for USCHS. The school does not require students to use M&M for their individual portraits, though highly recommends using the studio.

=== Other arts ===
The St. Clarion is the school's student newspaper. It usually produces four issues annually as well as a senior magazine issue. The paper is made during both journalism classes and by student volunteers. The paper writes on both world and campus news, detailing many events from sports to school policy changes. The paper is funded by community advertisers as well as student fund-raising.

The Montage is the school's literary arts magazine produced by the student body. The Montage produces one issue per year, selling copies to the student body in May. The magazine publishes original poems, short stories, personal essays, artwork, photography, and musical compositions written by the students. A staff of 15–20 people compiles the submissions into the magazine. As with the St. Clarion, the Montage is funded by both community advertisers and student fund-raising. In 2014, that year's edition of Montage won the American Scholastic Association Contest.

== Awards and rankings ==
USCHS is one of three secondary schools in Pennsylvania to be recognized as a Blue Ribbon School three times. (Note: The school received the blue ribbon award in 1984, 1989, and 2000.) According to state test scores, 92% of students are at least proficient in math and 91% in reading.

== Notable alumni ==
- Terry Babcock-Lumish – professor, economist, policymaker; founder of Islay Consulting LLC
- Sean Casey – first baseman for Cincinnati Reds, member of team's Hall of Fame
- Stephen Chbosky – author of The Perks of Being a Wallflower
- Joe David - sports executive and investor, president and owner of Pistoia Basket 2000
- Jeff Delaney - NFL defensive back
- Kim Director – actress
- Craig Dunaway – former football tight end for Pittsburgh Steelers
- Tim Federle – author, librettist, screenwriter, director, producer
- Kirk Ferentz – University of Iowa head coach
- Chuck Greenberg – sports attorney and baseball team owner
- Jeff Greenberg - sports executive
- Todd Haley – former Cleveland Browns and Pittsburgh Steelers offensive coordinator, former Kansas City Chiefs head coach
- Anthony Jeselnik – comedian
- Sean Lee – retired linebacker with the Dallas Cowboys
- Grant Lewis – NHL ice hockey player
- Jack Maitland – running back for Baltimore Colts and New England Patriots
- Ryan Malone – hockey player for Pittsburgh Penguins, silver medalist with 2010 U.S. Olympic team
- Landy Mertz - soccer player
- Robbie Mertz - professional soccer player
- Kevin Orie – third baseman for Chicago Cubs
- Dylan Reese – captain of Harvard Crimson hockey team, seventh-round draft pick by New York Rangers
- Kevin Slowey – baseball player, second-round selection by Minnesota Twins in 2005
- Doug Whaley – General Manager and Director of Pro Personnel for NFL's Buffalo Bills 2010–17
