= W. Scott Hardy =

American judge (born 1971)

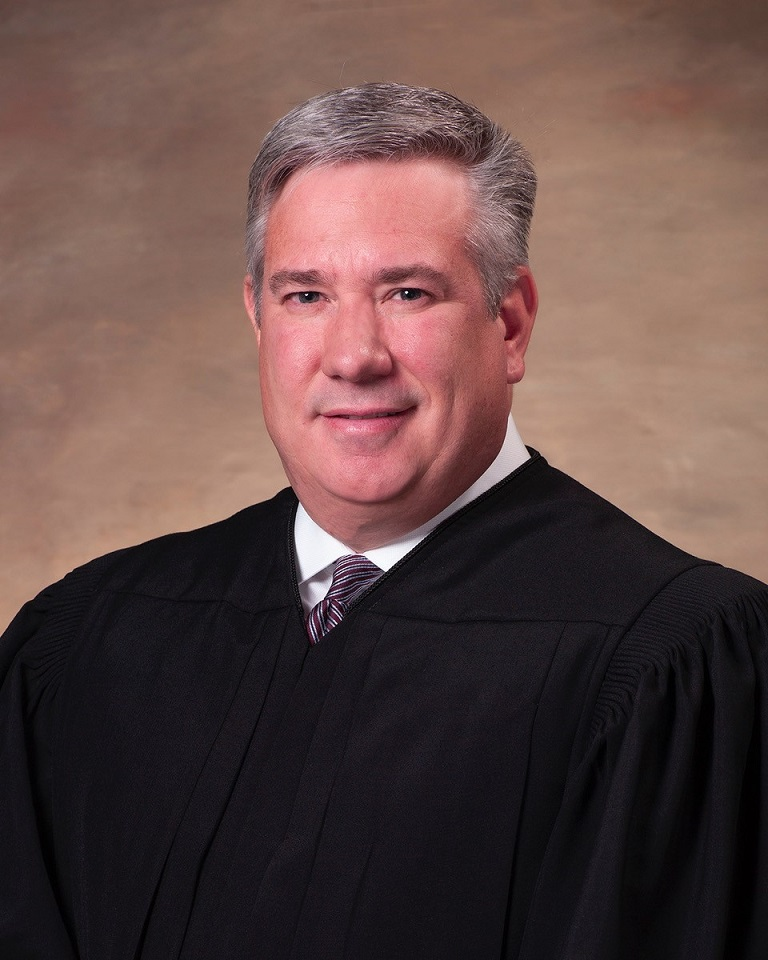

Judge of the United States District Court for the Western District of Pennsylvania
- Incumbent
- Assumed office July 31, 2020
- Appointed by: Donald Trump
- Preceded by: Nora Barry Fischer

Personal details
- Born: William Scott Hardy; 1971 (age 54–55) Pittsburgh, Pennsylvania, U.S.
- Party: Republican
- Education: Allegheny College (BA); University of Notre Dame (JD)

William Scott Hardy (born 1971) is a United States district judge of the United States District Court for the Western District of Pennsylvania.

== Education ==
Hardy earned his Bachelor of Arts, magna cum laude, from Allegheny College in 1993 and his Juris Doctor from Notre Dame Law School in 1996.

== Career ==
After law school, Hardy was an associate at Meyer, Unkovic & Scott, LLP in Pittsburgh from 1996 to 1997. Hardy practiced for more than a decade at Cohen & Grigsby in Pittsburgh. He previously served as President of the Dean W. Edward Sell Chapter of the American Inns of Court. Before becoming a judge, he was a shareholder in the Pittsburgh office of Ogletree, Deakins, Nash, Smoak & Stewart, where his practice focused on labor and employment law.

=== Federal judicial service ===
On November 6, 2019, President Donald Trump announced his intent to nominate Hardy to serve as a United States district judge of the United States District Court for the Western District of Pennsylvania. On December 2, 2019, his nomination was sent to the Senate. President Trump nominated Hardy to the seat vacated by Judge Nora Barry Fischer, who assumed senior status on June 13, 2019. Pennsylvania Senators Pat Toomey and Bob Casey Jr. endorsed the nomination. On January 3, 2020, his nomination was returned to the President under Rule XXXI, Paragraph 6 of the United States Senate. On January 6, 2020, his renomination was sent to the Senate. A hearing on his nomination before the Senate Judiciary Committee was held on January 8, 2020. On May 14, 2020, his nomination was reported out of committee by a 14–8 vote. On July 23, 2020, the United States Senate invoked cloture on his nomination by a 60–32 vote. On July 27, 2020, his nomination was confirmed by a 65–30 vote. He received his judicial commission on July 31, 2020.

Legal offices
Preceded by Nora Barry Fischer	Judge of the United States District Court for the Western District of Pennsylvania; 2020–present	Incumbent
