= Fulton House, Swansea =

Fulton House
- Ty Fulton
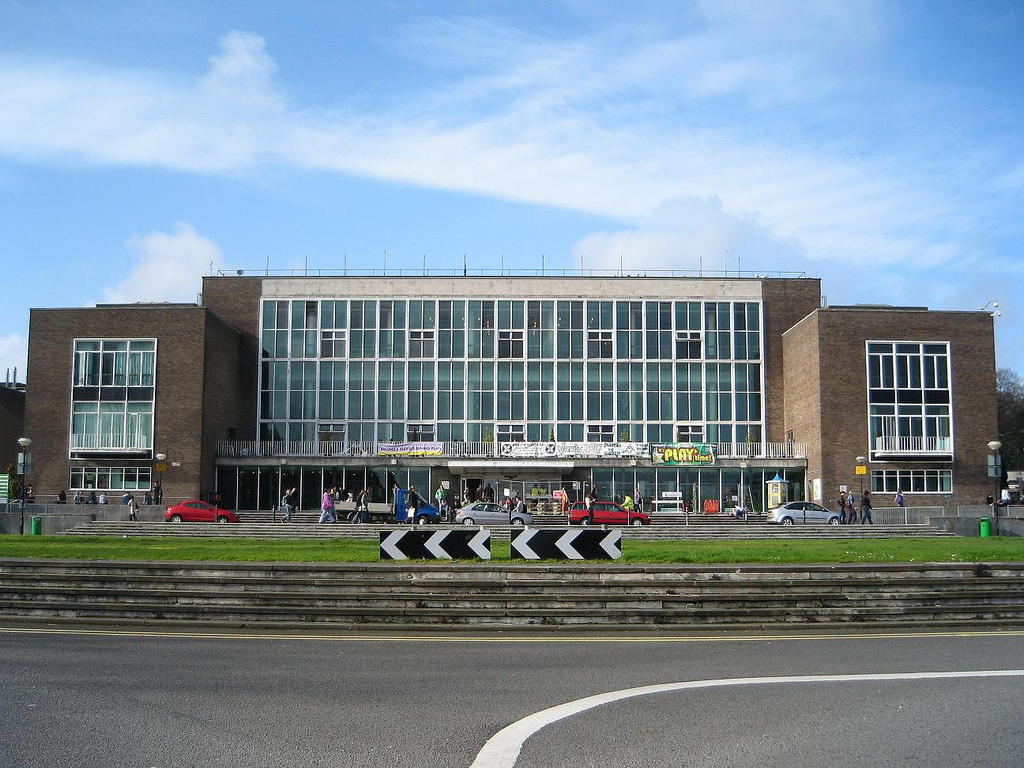
- Fulton House Swansea University
- Former names: College House

General information
- Architectural style: Modern architecture
- Town or city: Swansea
- Country: Wales
- Coordinates: 51.6095°N 3.9804°W
- Named for: John Fulton, Baron Fulton
- Year(s) built: 1958-62
- Owner: Swansea University

Design and construction
- Architect(s): Norman Percy Thomas
- Architecture firm: Percy Thomas Partnership

Fulton House is a Grade-II listed Swansea University building in Singleton Park, Swansea.

== History ==
The Modern Architecture building was designed by Norman Thomas of the Percy Thomas Partnership in the late 1950s under the guidance of the university's Principal John Fulton. The building is a large H-plan block projecting wings and a glazed curtain wall of 17 bays to a taller central block, faced mainly in brown brick. The interior main hall was designed by Misha Black.

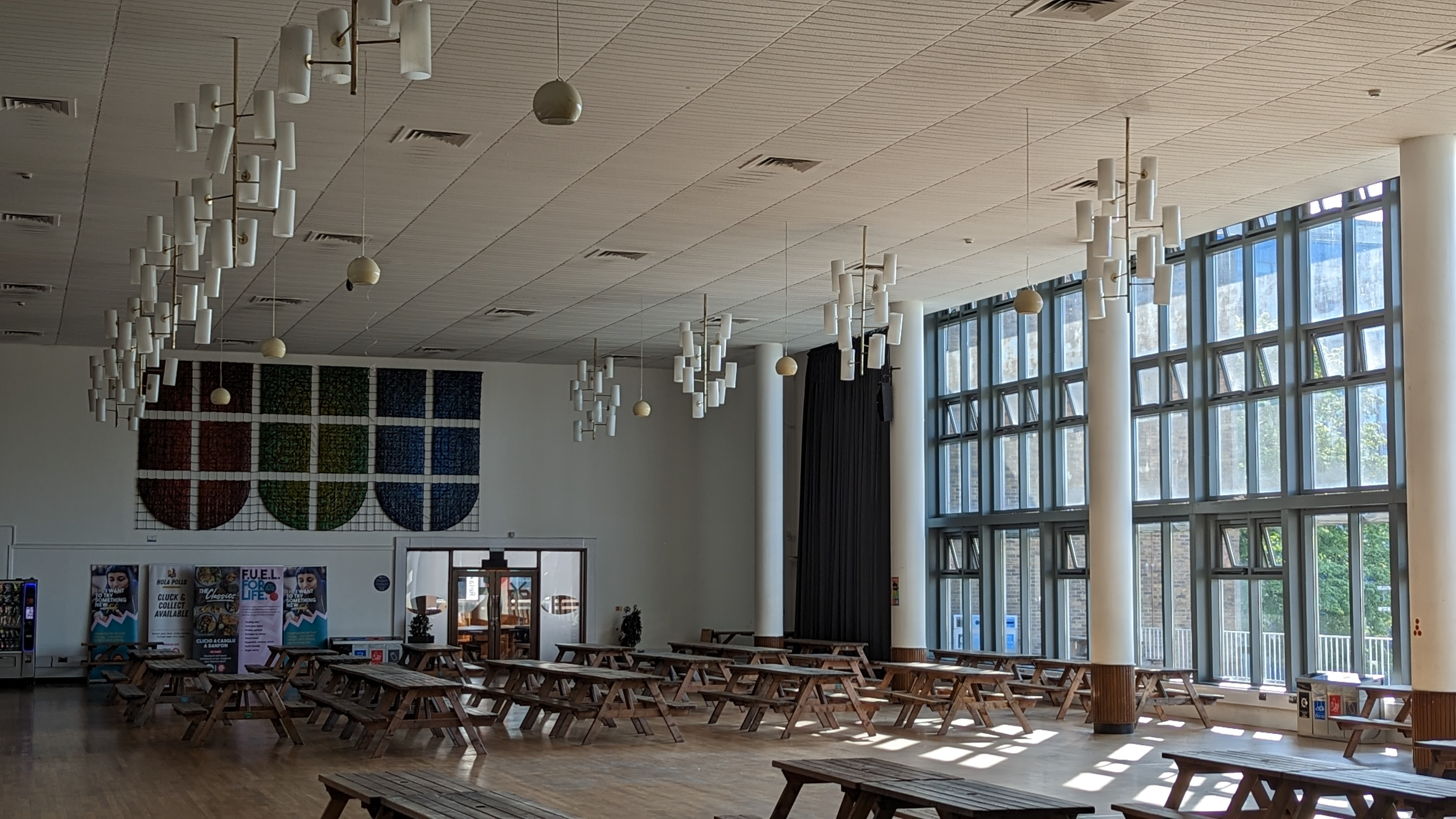
Refectory, Fulton House

Fulton House is the main focus of academic and social life at Swansea University and it was designed as a meeting place and a social and academic hub. It contains a range of food outlets and restaurants, a Costcutter supermarket, and the JC's bar. A number of the rooms have been converted into lecture halls and tutorial rooms. The building is also home to the university's Chaplaincy and Discovery SVS a student-led charity based in working to improve the lives of people in the Swansea area.

The building was renamed in 1986 in honour of John Fulton.

== Art ==
In the main hall, there is a mural by Ceri Richards with panels depicting The Rape of Europa installed in 1970. On the opposite wall, there is a mural by Glyn Jones in the form of three green, red, and blue shields in glazed plastic material and black cording is a creation in which the artist symbolically portrays the Holy Trinity. A war memorial for students and staff who died during the Second World War hangs in the main corridor on the ground floor of Fulton House.

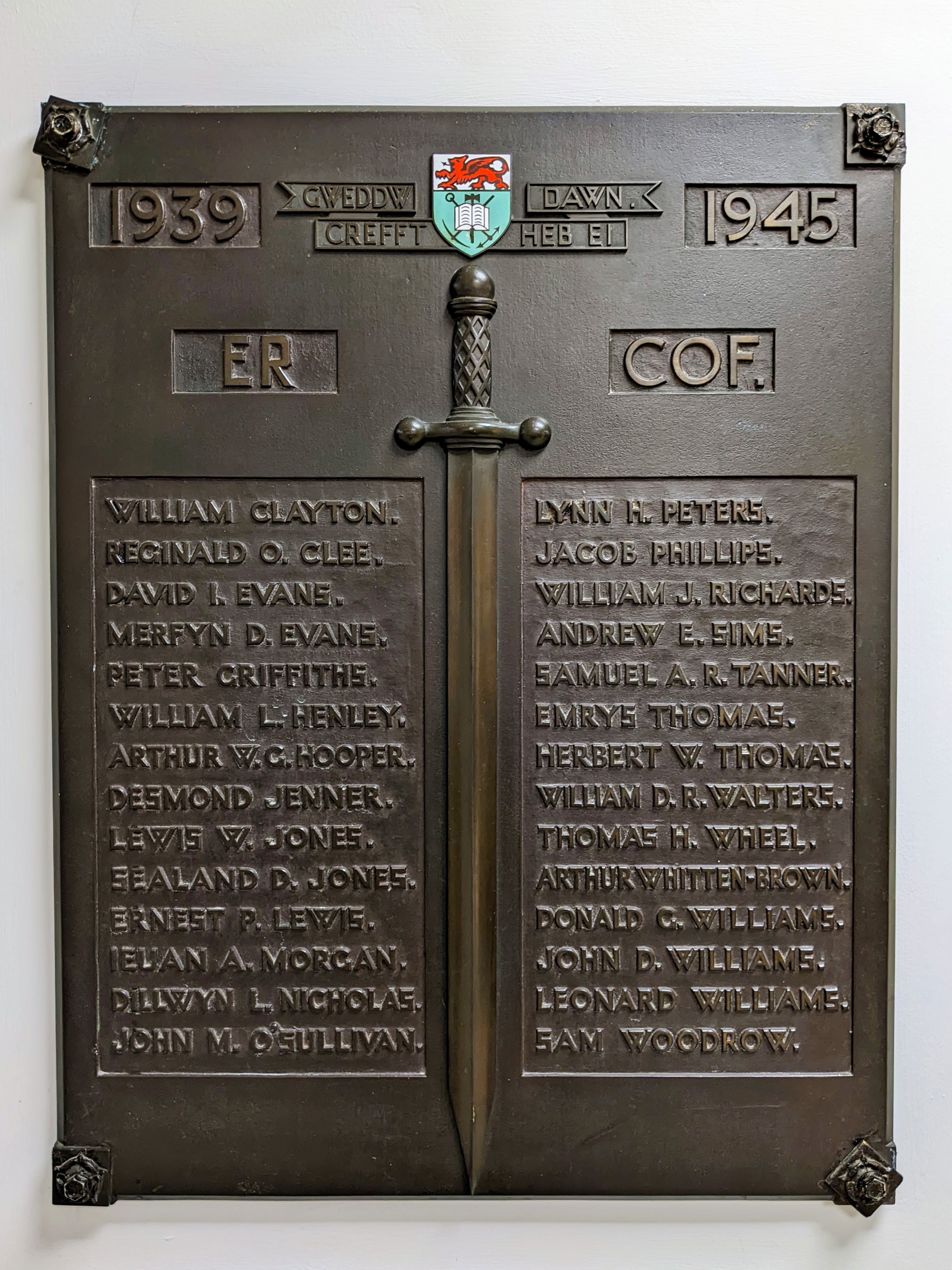
War memorial, Fulton House, Swansea University

== Location ==
Fulton House overlooks the Fulton Lawn facing the main entrance to Swansea University from Oystermouth Road, Swansea.
