= Chuck Greenberg (businessman) =

American sports attorney and Minor League Baseball owner (born 1961)

- Born: 1961 (age 64–65); Englewood, New Jersey, U.S.
- Education: Tufts University (BS); University of Michigan Law School (JD)
- Occupations: Attorney; Professional sports owner
- Known for: Owner of the State College Spikes, Myrtle Beach Pelicans and Frisco RoughRiders of Minor League Baseball; Former owner of the Texas Rangers of Major League Baseball
- Children: 3

Charles M. Greenberg (born 1961) is an American sports attorney, chairman and founder of the Greenberg Sports Group, and owner of three minor league baseball teams. Greenberg was managing partner of Rangers Baseball Express, LLC, which on August 5, 2010, won court approval to purchase the Texas Rangers, a Major League Baseball team, from Tom Hicks and Hicks Sports Group. Greenberg served as Managing Partner and CEO of the Rangers from 2010 to 2011.

== Early life and education ==
Greenberg was born to a Jewish family, in Englewood, New Jersey, but his family moved to Pittsburgh before his first birthday. He is one of three sons of David and Barbara Greenberg. He graduated from Upper St. Clair High School in Pittsburgh in 1978 and went on to enroll at Tufts University in Massachusetts.

While at Tufts, Greenberg majored in political science and graduated summa cum laude with a bachelor's degree in 1982. From there he went on to the University of Michigan Law School, where he received his juris doctor in 1985.

== Early career ==
After law school, Greenberg began his law career in his hometown of Pittsburgh, as an associate and then partner at Cohen & Grigsby, where he practiced for 13 years. In 1998, he joined Pepper Hamilton as a corporate and sports attorney and a partner in the Pennsylvania-based law firm. While at Pepper Hamilton, Greenberg headed the firm's sports practice and was a member of its executive committee from 2002 to 2008.

Among his most prominent work as a sports industry attorney, Greenberg was instrumental in a deal that landed NHL Hall of Famer, Mario Lemieux, ownership of the then-bankrupt Pittsburgh Penguins hockey team in 1999. The deal is credited with saving the franchise for the city and Western Pennsylvania. In 2007, Greenberg again represented Lemieux and the Penguins in successful negotiations with the state, the City of Pittsburgh and Allegheny County which resulted in a deal to build the new Consol Energy Center (now known as PPG Paints Arena) in downtown Pittsburgh and secured the future of the Penguins in Pittsburgh for another 30 years.

== Sports franchises ownership ==
Beginning in 2002, Greenberg formed and led an ownership group that purchased the Double-A Eastern League's Altoona Curve, a minor league baseball team in Pennsylvania. For seven seasons (2002–2008), Greenberg acted as managing partner and president of the team. He is credited with helping the organization set fan attendance records, while continually re-investing money to improve the Blair County Ballpark, which resulted in national recognition of the franchise as one of the most innovative teams in professional sports. Due in part to Greenberg's contributions to the baseball industry and the local community, the organization was awarded the John H. Johnson Presidents Trophy in December 2006, given to the top franchise in all of Minor League Baseball for overall quality and performance. During Greenberg's tenure as managing partner and president, the franchise won several other awards, including the Larry MacPhail Award, presented in December 2004 by the Minor League Baseball association as the top franchise in all of Minor League Baseball for marketing, promotions, and community service and the Bob Freitas Award in November 2006, awarded by Baseball America as the top Double-A franchise in Minor League Baseball. Greenberg was also a finalist for the Ernst & Young Entrepreneur of the Year in 2006 as a finalist in the Western Pennsylvania and New York Region for ownership and management of Altoona Curve and State College Spikes. Greenberg and his ownership group (Curve Baseball LP) sold the team to the Robert F. Lozinak family in 2008.

While continuing to manage and operate the Altoona Curve, Greenberg and his investment group also purchased the former New Jersey Cardinals. He immediately relocated the franchise to State College, Pennsylvania, in collaboration with Penn State University. Greenberg worked with the university to create the area's first-ever professional sports franchise, the State College Spikes, which began play in the New York-Penn League in 2006. Greenberg's hard work associated with the unique relationship between the Spikes and the university has become a model in the industry for facilities, shared by a major university and a professional sports franchise. Medlar Field at Lubrano Park was the first ballpark in America LEED-certified for leadership in environmental and energy design. In conjunction with Major League Baseball's reorganization of Minor League Baseball following the 2020 season, Greenberg partnered with MLB and other owners in the creation of the new MLB Draft League, which serves as a showcase for draft-eligible players. The Spikes became a founding member of the MLB Draft League and have continued to flourish.

Greenberg took over as president and managing partner of the Myrtle Beach Pelicans in June 2006 when he and a group of investors purchased the Minor League Baseball team. Greenberg worked to enhance Pelicans Ballpark in Myrtle Beach, making it one of the most fan-friendly venues in Minor League Baseball. Greenberg and his group of investors immediately invested $2.5 million on a wide array of upgrades to enhance Pelicans ballpark, including the opening of Pelican's Beach, dubbed "the only baseball-front beach in America". The Pelicans also reached several attendance milestones, including setting the team's all-time franchise attendance record in 2008 and the all-time average attendance record in 2009, a record that has since been broken in 2014 and again in 2015. In 2025, the Pelicans surpassed the franchise record for attendance in a single game, welcoming 6,600 fans to the ballpark on July 4th. In December 2015, the Pelicans won Baseball America's Bob Freitas Award as the top Class A-Advanced franchise in Minor League Baseball. As of 2024, Pelicans Ballpark has won Stadium Journey Top Gameday Experience for Single-A Baseball Award a remarkable six seasons in a row.

In August 2014, Greenberg led an ownership that purchased the Frisco RoughRiders, the Double-A affiliate of the Texas Rangers. The new ownership group has spearheaded numerous major franchise improvements, from a completely new team identity to massive additions and upgrades to Riders Field, including a giant 2,763-square-foot HD video board and nearly 2,500-square-feet of new outfield-wall LED ribbons, a state-of-the-art sound system, a completely redesigned and modern video control room, an open-air in-park sports bar, a relocated and expanded team store, known as "Riders Outpost", improved food service and menu, and a complete overhaul of in-game entertainment. The improvements earned the Riders and the City of Frisco "Best Ballpark Renovation" of 2015 by Ballpark Digest in the under $6 million category. In 2016, Greenberg and the franchise innovated, creating the one-of-a-kind Lazy River beyond the right-field wall. Opening on June 9th, 2016, the 174-foot Lazy River is the largest known water feature at a professional sports venue in the world. The Lazy River has since become an iconic attraction at the stadium and has led to the ballpark being featured on national media outlets, such as ESPN, MLB Network, CBS Nightly News and more.

=== Texas Rangers ===
Rangers Baseball Express, led by Greenberg and including former baseball great Nolan Ryan, won an auction to purchase the Texas Rangers on August 5, 2010, after hours of courtroom bidding. Greenberg described it as "a painful process ... it dispelled any notion that we haven't earned our way. We will deliver on our promises. And we want to deliver a championship."

The two parties bidding for the franchise were the Ryan/Greenberg group and a group led by Dallas Mavericks owner Mark Cuban and Houston businessman Jim Crane. Hours of delays and bidding resulted in a final sale price of $593 million, $385 million cash and $208 million in assumed liabilities.

Rangers Baseball Express, LLC, had earlier signed a definitive agreement to purchase the Texas Rangers team from Tom Hicks and Hicks Sports Group on January 23, 2010. The Dallas Observer said in April 2010 that Greenberg "has the money and moxie to lead the Texas Rangers back to relevancy and into the playoffs."

Greenberg served as managing partner and CEO of the Rangers, while Ryan continued in his role as team president. Greenberg's vision for the team included both a dedication to being the best at every aspect of the operation and a focus on creating a highly entertaining fan experience at the ballpark. Greenberg said, "[W]e're here to win. We love baseball. We have an unbelievably deep emotional attachment to the Rangers and Rangers' fans. We're going to do everything we can to win."

Rangers General Manager Jon Daniels has praised Greenberg for his personal connection to the fans, noting "He's just a normal guy. Jeans and T-shirts. He's really in tune with fans and knows how to have his finger on the pulse of what they want. He's very impressive. He wants revenue, make no mistake about that. But above and beyond that comes winning."

During the 2010 World Series Greenberg, as a guest on a local ESPN radio show, Ben and Skin, made negative comments about the New York Yankees fans during the ALCS.

I thought Yankee fans, frankly, were awful. They were either violent or apathetic, neither of which is good. So I thought Yankee fans were by far the worst of any I've seen in the postseason. I thought they were an embarrassment.

— Chuck Greenberg

Greenberg would later apologize publicly and to Hal Steinbrenner and Randy Levine of the New York Yankees. The comments made by Greenberg followed an incident in Game 3 of the ALCS when Kristen Lee, wife of Texas Ranger pitcher Cliff Lee, told the media about the treatment her and other players' wives received by fans at New Yankee Stadium. Misty May, wife of backup catcher Matt Treanor, posted pictures on her Facebook page of Yankee fans spitting from the upper deck down into the section where her family and other Rangers fans were sitting.

On March 11, 2011, Greenberg announced that he was stepping down as Managing Partner and Chief Executive Officer of the Texas Rangers and that he would be selling his interest in the Rangers and will no longer be associated with the franchise. Club president Nolan Ryan assumed the title of CEO, overseeing all aspects of the Rangers operations on both the baseball and the business side.

=== Carolina Hurricanes bid ===
In July 2017, Greenberg was reported to have signed a letter of intent to purchase the Carolina Hurricanes NHL franchise for approximately $500M. Previously, Greenberg had expressed interest in purchasing the Dallas Stars in 2011 before the team was sold to Tom Gaglardi. The sale of the Hurricanes to Greenberg would later fell apart and the team would be sold to Thomas Dundon in 2018.

== Other sports interests ==
In October 2008, Greenberg founded Greenberg Sports Group. The company provides management, consulting and marketing services to the sports industry. Among serving on multiple boards, he has served on the board of directors of the Mario Lemieux Foundation since its inception in 1994. Greenberg has also served on the Sports Business Research Advisory Board at Penn State University, representing team owners in the work of the Center for Sports Business Research.

Greenberg has had a long-time association with Dallas Mavericks owner Mark Cuban. When they lived in Pittsburgh, the two were neighbors, and both attended the Temple Emanuel synagogue. Cuban said that Greenberg "puts the fan first, and he likes to make sure they have fun. I think he is going to be great for the Rangers, and I have told him I am happy to help in any way I can."

== Personal life ==
Chuck has three adult sons; Jeff, Jack, and Ben, and he currently makes his home in California.
