= Ryan Maki =

American ice hockey player (born 1985)

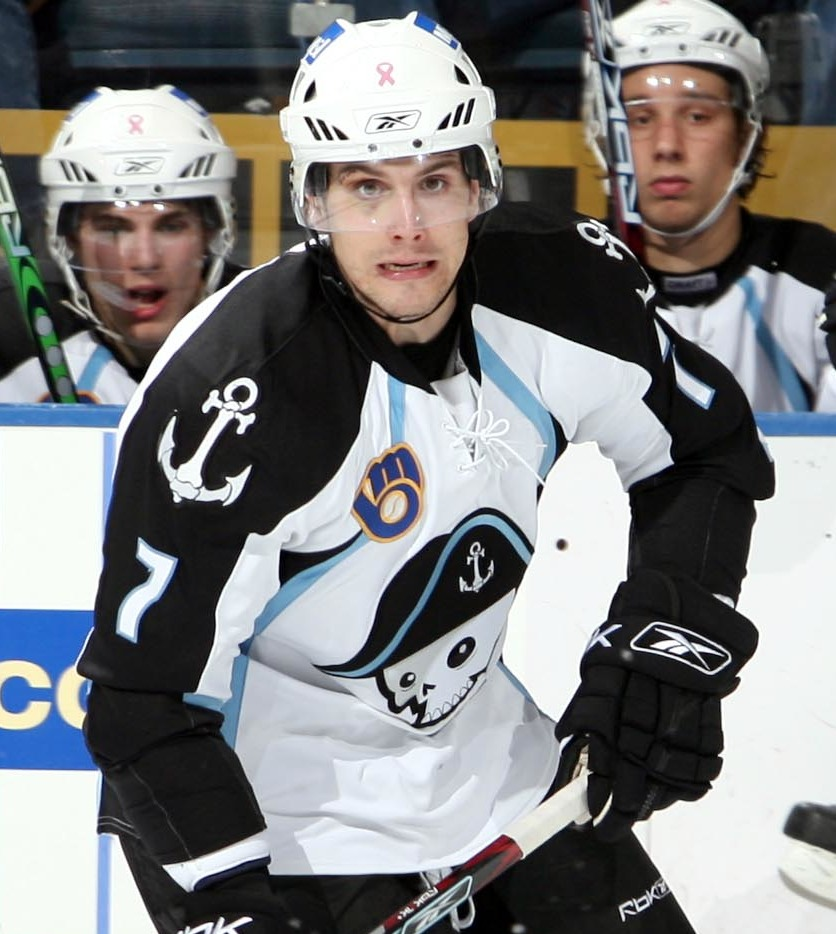
- Maki with the Milwaukee Admirals in 2007
- Born: April 23, 1985 (age 41) Medford, New Jersey, U.S.
- Height: 6 ft 3 in (191 cm)
- Weight: 208 lb (94 kg; 14 st 12 lb)
- Position: Right wing
- Shot: Right
- Played for: Milwaukee Admirals; Hannover Scorpions
- NHL draft: 176th overall, 2005; Nashville Predators
- Playing career: 2007–2012

Ryan Maki (born April 23, 1985) is an American former professional ice hockey right winger who played for the Milwaukee Admirals of the American Hockey League and the Hannover Scorpions of the Deutsche Eishockey Liga (DEL).

== Playing career ==
Maki grew up in Shelby Twp, MI and was selected to play in the U.S. National Development Team Program as a junior from 2001 to 2003. Maki was recruited and attended Harvard University in the ECAC and majored in economics.

He was drafted from Harvard in the sixth round, 176th overall, of the 2005 NHL entry draft by the Nashville Predators. After graduating from College, Maki signed a two-year entry-level contract with the Predators and was reassigned to American Hockey League affiliate, the Milwaukee Admirals. During the 2008–09 season, Maki was named as the Admirals winner for the AHL man of the year award.

Prior to the 2010–11 season, Maki left North America and after trialling with the Hannover Scorpions, was signed to a contract on September 2, 2010. Despite improving his offensive output in the following season with the Scorpions, Maki announced his retirement from professional hockey on August 10, 2012.

== Career statistics ==
=== Regular season and playoffs ===
			Regular season					Playoffs
Season	Team	League	GP	G	A	Pts	PIM	GP	G	A	Pts	PIM
2000–01	Strathroy Rockets	GOHL	4	0	1	1	0	—	—	—	—	—
2001–02	U.S. NTDP U18	NAHL	31	4	11	15	24	—	—	—	—	—
2002–03	U.S. NTDP U18	USDP	52	6	6	12	26	—	—	—	—	—
2002–03	U.S. NTDP U18	NAHL	10	1	0	1	8	—	—	—	—	—
2003–04	Harvard University	ECAC	34	4	4	8	18	—	—	—	—	—
2004–05	Harvard University	ECAC	30	10	9	19	20	—	—	—	—	—
2005–06	Harvard University	ECAC	33	10	12	22	32	—	—	—	—	—
2006–07	Harvard University	ECAC	32	12	11	23	36	—	—	—	—	—
2006–07	Milwaukee Admirals	AHL	2	0	1	1	0	2	0	0	0	0
2007–08	Milwaukee Admirals	AHL	54	2	3	5	23	3	0	0	0	2
2007–08	Cincinnati Cyclones	ECHL	5	1	0	1	4	6	1	0	1	4
2008–09	Milwaukee Admirals	AHL	65	12	13	25	37	11	1	1	2	4
2009–10	Milwaukee Admirals	AHL	61	6	9	15	17	7	2	2	4	0
2010–11	Hannover Scorpions	DEL	52	8	8	16	40	5	2	5	7	4
2011–12	Hannover Scorpions	DEL	43	9	15	24	34	—	—	—	—	—
AHL totals			182	20	26	46	77	23	3	3	6	6
DEL totals			95	17	23	40	74	5	2	5	7	4

=== International ===
Year	Team	Event	GP	G	A	Pts	PIM
2002	United States	U17	6	1	2	3	4
Junior totals			6	1	2	3	4
