= Fulton Log House =

Historic house in Pennsylvania, United States

- U.S. National Register of Historic Places
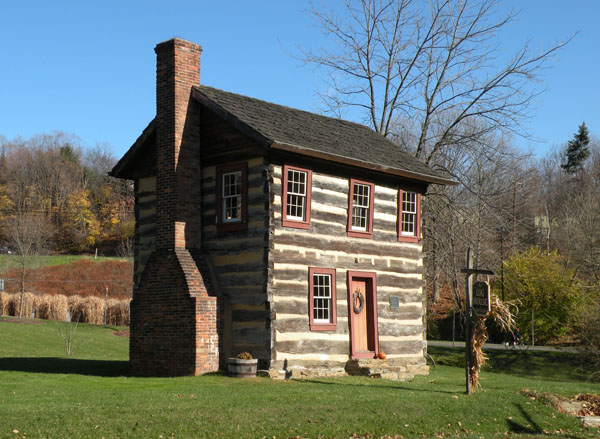

- Location within Pennsylvania Location within the United States
- Location: Southwest of Pittsburgh on Clifton–Bridgeville Road off U.S. Route 19, Upper St. Clair Township, Pennsylvania, USA
- Coordinates: 40°19′58.8″N 80°4′14.36″W
- Built: circa 1830
- NRHP reference No.: 75001610
- Added to NRHP: December 6, 1975

The Fulton Log House in Upper St. Clair Township, Pennsylvania, was built circa 1830. The log house was listed on the National Register of Historic Places on December 6, 1975.

Alexander Gilfillan settled in Upper St. Clair Township in the late 1760s and eventually owned 413 acres. About 1830, he or his son, John, built houses for his workers including four or five log houses, with only one surviving to the present. This house remained in the Gilfillan Family until 1899. James E. and Emily Fulton bought the house in 1923 as a summer home. Their son James Grove Fulton was a lifelong bachelor and served in the U.S. Congress from 1945 to 1971. His estate sold the house to Upper St. Clair Township in 1972.

The 1830 Log House Association restored the house and now uses it for educational purposes.
