= Fulton Farm =

Historic house in Ohio, United States

- U.S. National Register of Historic Places
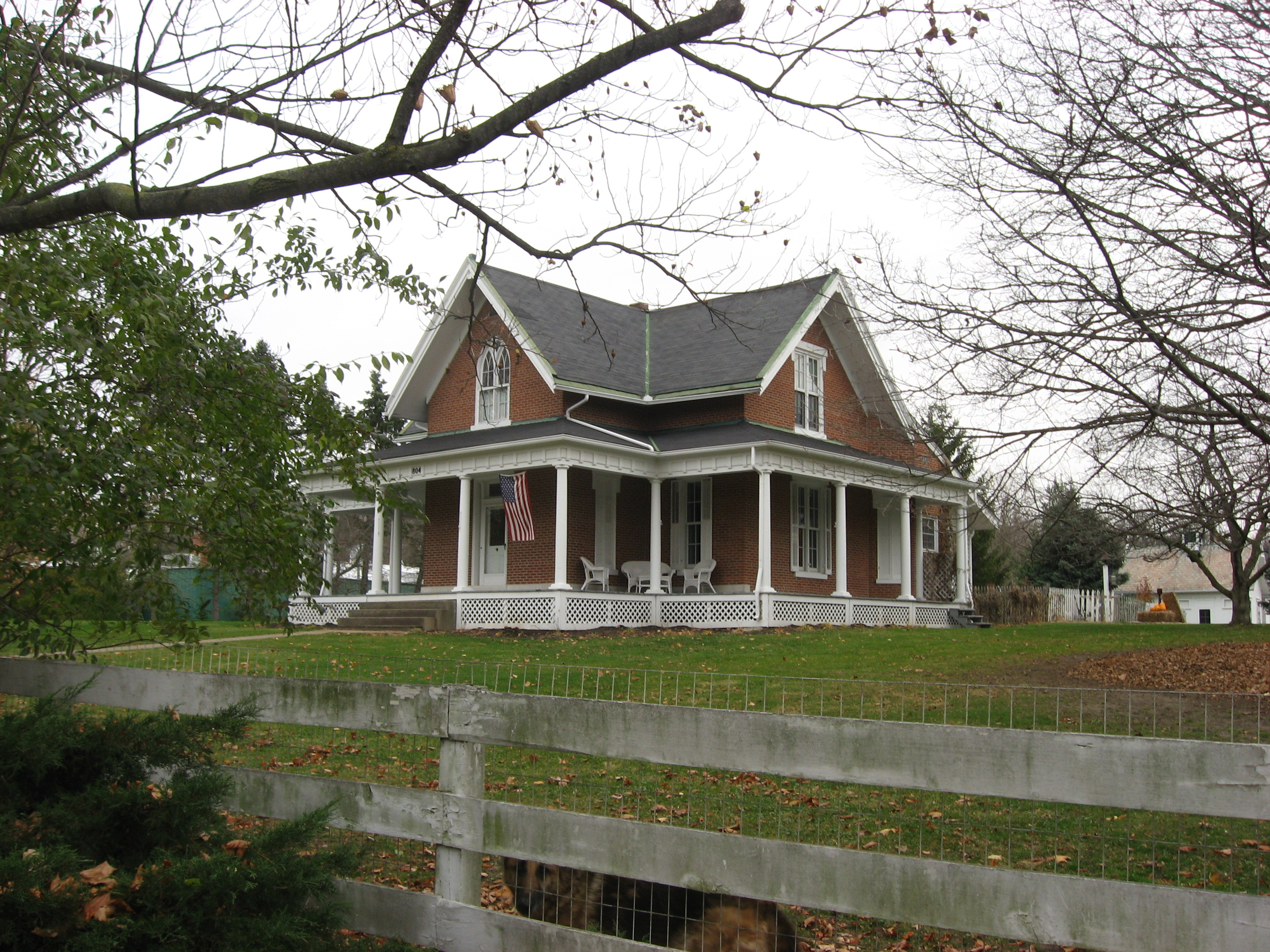
- Front of the farmhouse

- Location within Ohio Location within the United States
- Location: 804 S. Brooklyn Ave., Sidney, Ohio, United States
- Coordinates: 40°16′34″N 84°8′55″W
- Area: 2 acres (0.81 ha)
- Built: 1848
- Architect: Isaac T. Fulton
- Architectural style: Gothic Revival
- NRHP reference No.: 79001947
- Added to NRHP: May 8, 1979

The Fulton Farm, also known as "River Bend Farm," is a historic farmstead in Shelby County, Ohio, United States. Located on the southern side of the city of Sidney, the farm is composed of five buildings spread out over an area of approximately 2 acres (0.81 ha). Built primarily in 1848, the distinctively Gothic Revival farm buildings are a leading element of Shelby County rural architecture; few pre-Civil War farmhouses elsewhere in the county are more elaborate. Besides the farmhouse, the complex includes four less important buildings, two brick and two wooden: a smokehouse, a carriage house, and two smaller barns.

Prominent farmer Isaac Fulton built the one-and-one-half story farmhouse and other buildings for his wife, the former Jane Taylor, soon after their 1848 wedding. The construction, which was not finished until 1850, was almost entirely Fulton's work; he even made the bricks by himself. Fulton used an unusual floor plan; the house's footprint is asymmetrical, and its windows are a mix of trabeated and traditional Gothic Revival styles. A rectangle large enough to support the entire house would measure approximately 50 feet (15 m) by 42 feet (13 m).

In 1979, the Fulton Farm was listed on the National Register of Historic Places. It qualified for inclusion on the Register because of its impact on two different areas of local history: its well-preserved historic architecture and its place in the development of agriculture in central Shelby County.
