= Dylan Reese =

American ice hockey player (born 1984)

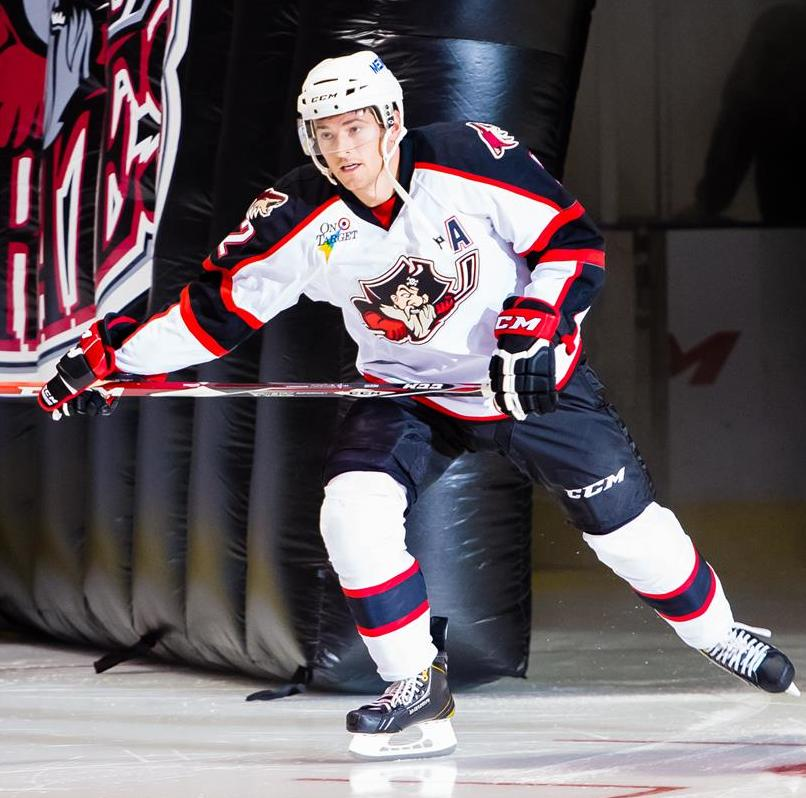
- Reese with the Portland Pirates in 2014
- Born: August 29, 1984 (age 41) Pittsburgh, Pennsylvania, U.S.
- Height: 6 ft 0 in (183 cm)
- Weight: 205 lb (93 kg; 14 st 9 lb)
- Position: Defense
- Shot: Right
- Played for: New York Islanders; Pittsburgh Penguins; Amur Khabarovsk; Arizona Coyotes; HV71
- NHL draft: 209th overall, 2003; New York Rangers
- Playing career: 2007–2018

Dylan Paul Reese (born August 29, 1984) is an American former professional ice hockey defenseman. He last played with HV71 in the Swedish Hockey League (SHL).

== Early life ==
Reese, who is Jewish, was born in Pittsburgh, Pennsylvania. He is the son of Barry and Marcie Reese, grandson of Rita Reese and Agnes and Richard Hornak, and has a brother named Evan. He attended Upper St. Clair High School.

== Playing career ==
Reese was drafted in 2000, in round 16 (#323 overall) by Belleville Bulls in the OHL Priority Selection. He was then drafted in 2002, in round 1 (#9 overall) by the Lincoln Stars in the USHL Entry Draft.

Reese was drafted 209th overall in the 2003 NHL entry draft by the New York Rangers. He played collegiate hockey with Harvard of the ECAC where he won two conference championships as well as made three NCAA tournament appearances. After missing 15 games his freshman season, including the 2004 World Junior Championships due to a back injury, Reese bounced back to have an outstanding sophomore campaign in 2004–05. He led all Crimson defensemen in scoring with 19 points (7 goals, 12 assists) playing in all 34 games that season. Reese, who played alongside senior Ryan Lannon for nearly the entire year, was a member of one of the best defensive corps in the nation. He went on to lead Harvard defensemen in scoring each of the next two seasons while being named team captain and MVP his senior year. In both 2005-2006 and in 2006-2007 he was an NCAA (ECAC) Second All-Star Team.

Reese made his professional debut in the 2007–08 season with the Phoenix Coyotes affiliate, the San Antonio Rampage of the AHL. He played in 59 games, but his contributions were minimal as he was often scratched in favor of veteran defensemen Travis Roche, Bryan Helmer and Brendan Bell. In the 2008–09 season, Reese's ice time was increased significantly as he was again paired with former Harvard teammate Ryan Lannon on the back end. Although the Rampage remained near the bottom of the pack all season Reese showed significant development as he contributed 28 points and played regularly in all situations.

In the summer of 2009 Reese received a contract with the Columbus Blue Jackets after attending their camp on a tryout basis. He was immediately assigned to Columbus' American League affiliate the Syracuse Crunch. He played in 51 games for the Crunch scoring 22 points and recording a team best +12 rating. Then, on March 1, two days before the NHL trade deadline Reese was dealt to the New York Islanders in exchange for Islanders forward Greg Moore. After reporting to the Islanders' AHL affiliate the Bridgeport Sound Tigers for one game, where he recorded a goal and an assist, Reese was recalled by the Islanders where he remained the rest of the season. Reese finished the season with two goals, two assists, and a +4 rating.

Reese began the 2010–11 AHL season with the Islanders' top AHL affiliate, the Bridgeport Sound Tigers, but on November 15, 2010 the defenseman was recalled to the NHL.

After a single season within the Pittsburgh Penguins organization in the 2012–13 season, Reese opted to leave North America and sign with Russian club, Amur Khabarovsk in the KHL. He said of his experience: "[Khabarovsk] is the coldest city. It was literally negative 20 for like one month straight; I’m not kidding... People treated me well, but at the same time, I didn’t understand what anyone was saying."

On July 1, 2014, Reese returned to the NHL in signing a one-year two-way contract with the Arizona Coyotes.

On July 18, 2016, as a free agent following the completion of his contract with the Coyotes, Reese left for abroad, agreeing to a one-year deal with Swedish club, HV71 of the SHL.

== Career statistics ==
			Regular season					Playoffs
Season	Team	League	GP	G	A	Pts	PIM	GP	G	A	Pts	PIM
2000–01	Pittsburgh Hornets 18U AAA	Midget	66	14	42	56	—	—	—	—	—	—
2000–01	Texas Tornado	NAHL	1	0	2	2	0	—	—	—	—	—
2001–02	Pittsburgh Forge	NAHL	55	8	24	32	74	—	—	—	—	—
2002–03	Pittsburgh Forge	NAHL	56	11	30	41	98	—	—	—	—	—
2003–04	Harvard University	ECAC	21	1	4	5	18	—	—	—	—	—
2004–05	Harvard University	ECAC	34	7	12	19	44	—	—	—	—	—
2005–06	Harvard University	ECAC	33	4	15	19	36	—	—	—	—	—
2006–07	Harvard University	ECAC	33	9	9	18	26	—	—	—	—	—
2006–07	Hartford Wolf Pack	AHL	10	0	4	4	12	2	0	0	0	2
2007–08	San Antonio Rampage	AHL	59	1	6	7	49	3	1	1	2	4
2008–09	San Antonio Rampage	AHL	75	1	27	28	64	—	—	—	—	—
2009–10	Syracuse Crunch	AHL	51	4	18	22	31	—	—	—	—	—
2009–10	Bridgeport Sound Tigers	AHL	1	1	1	2	0	5	1	3	4	0
2009–10	New York Islanders	NHL	19	2	2	4	14	—	—	—	—	—
2010–11	Bridgeport Sound Tigers	AHL	37	4	14	18	30	—	—	—	—	—
2010–11	New York Islanders	NHL	27	0	6	6	15	—	—	—	—	—
2011–12	New York Islanders	NHL	28	1	6	7	11	—	—	—	—	—
2011–12	Bridgeport Sound Tigers	AHL	27	2	13	15	12	—	—	—	—	—
2012–13	Wilkes–Barre/Scranton Penguins	AHL	66	8	17	25	34	5	0	1	1	2
2012–13	Pittsburgh Penguins	NHL	3	0	0	0	0	—	—	—	—	—
2013–14	Amur Khabarovsk	KHL	45	2	5	7	20	—	—	—	—	—
2014–15	Portland Pirates	AHL	72	10	30	40	42	5	0	2	2	2
2014–15	Arizona Coyotes	NHL	1	0	0	0	0	—	—	—	—	—
2015–16	Springfield Falcons	AHL	23	1	7	8	19	—	—	—	—	—
2016–17	HV71	SHL	24	2	10	12	25	16	0	9	9	4
2017–18	HV71	SHL	36	4	8	12	22	—	—	—	—	—
AHL totals			421	32	137	169	293	20	2	7	9	10
NHL totals			78	3	14	17	40	—	—	—	—	—

== Awards and honors ==
Award	Year
College
All-ECAC Hockey Second Team	2005–06
ECAC Hockey All-Tournament Team	2006
All-ECAC Hockey Second Team	2006–07
SHL
Le Mat Trophy (HV71)	2017

== See also ==
- List of select Jewish ice hockey players
