= Grant Lewis =

American ice hockey player (born 1985)

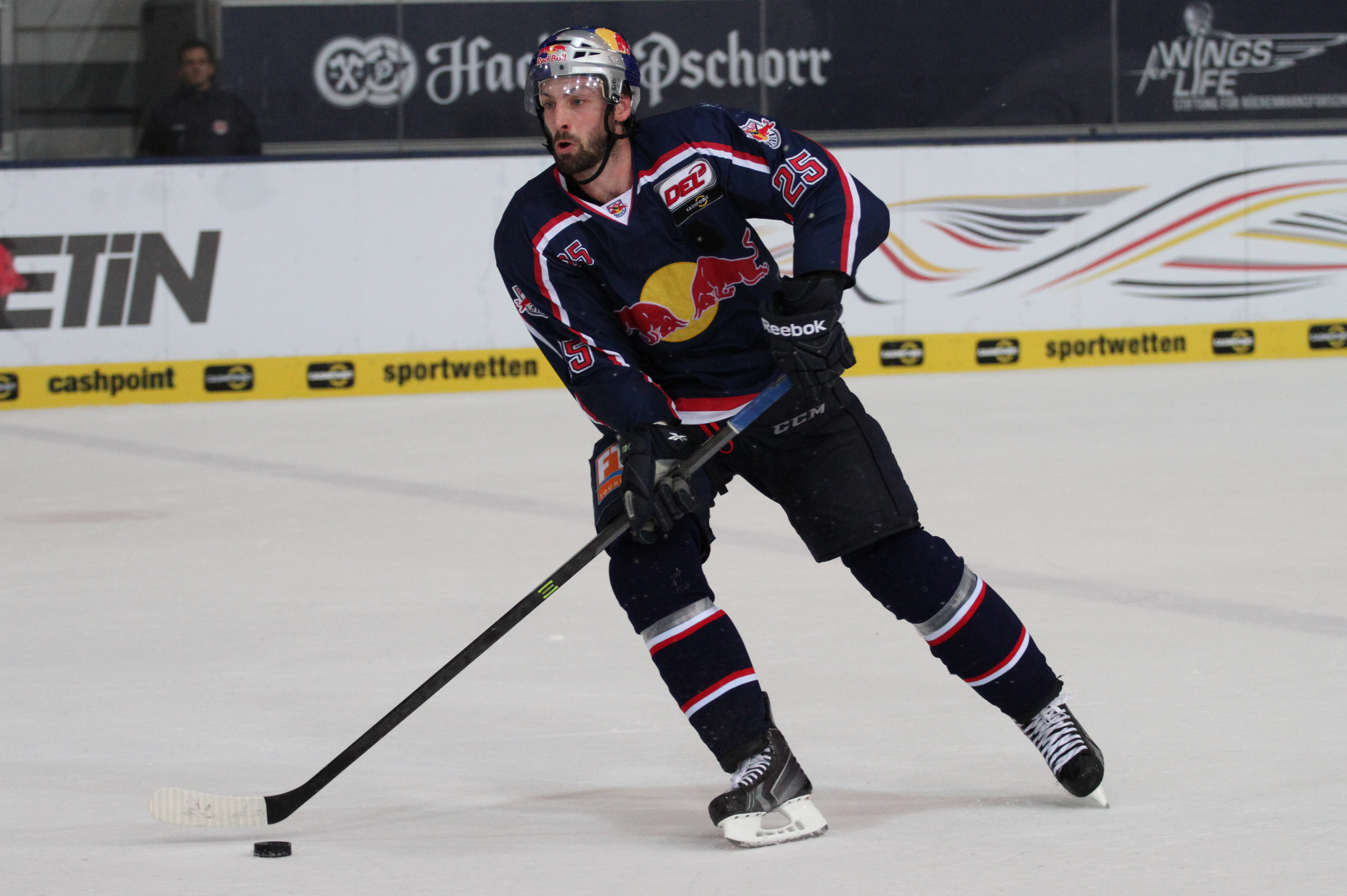
- Born: January 20, 1985 (age 41) Pittsburgh, Pennsylvania, U.S.
- Height: 6 ft 3 in (191 cm)
- Weight: 190 lb (86 kg; 13 st 8 lb)
- Position: Defense
- Shot: Right
- Played for: Atlanta Thrashers; Lev Poprad; Straubing Tigers; EHC München; EHC Black Wings Linz
- NHL draft: 40th overall, 2004; Atlanta Thrashers
- Playing career: 2007–2016

Grant Lewis (born January 20, 1985) is an American former professional ice hockey defenseman.

== Early life ==
Lewis, who is Jewish, was born in Pittsburgh. He attended Upper St. Clair High School. Upon the completion of his professional playing career in 2016, Lewis set his sights on pursuing a professional career in dentistry. He is currently on track to receive a DDS degree.

== Playing career ==
Lewis was drafted 40th overall in the 2004 NHL entry draft by the Atlanta Thrashers. He played collegiate hockey with Dartmouth College of the ECAC. During his freshman season he had 25 points, including 3 goals, in 34 games. His 25 points was the second-highest for a freshman in the history of the college. In four seasons he played in 120 games, and had 13 goals and 64 assists for 77 points.

Grant was signed by the Thrashers to a three-year entry-level contract on July 6, 2007.

Lewis made his professional debut in the 2007–08 season with the Thrashers affiliate, the Chicago Wolves of the AHL. He played in 43 games with the Wolves, helping the Wolves capture the Calder Cup. In the 2008–09 season, Lewis was recalled by the Thrashers on March 2, 2009. He made his NHL debut for the Thrashers on March 3, 2009, in a 4–3 loss against the Florida Panthers.

Grant played in 26 games with the Wolves in the 2009–10 season, before he was reassigned, by the Thrashers, to the Hershey Bears on March 10, 2010. Used as a depth defenseman, Grant played in one playoff game with the Bears as they successfully defended the Calder Cup.

On September 1, 2010, Grant was traded prior to the 2010–11 season by the Thrashers to the Nashville Predators for Ian McKenzie.

After the 2010–11 season with the Milwaukee Admirals, Grant left for Europe and experienced a one-year tenure in the Russian Kontinental Hockey League with Lev Poprad.

Lewis spent the duration of the 2012–13 season, with the Straubing Tigers of the German DEL. On June 3, 2013, Lewis remained in Germany, transferring to EHC München on a one-year contract.

== Career statistics ==
			Regular season					Playoffs
Season	Team	League	GP	G	A	Pts	PIM	GP	G	A	Pts	PIM
2000–01	Upper St. Clair High School	HSPA
2001–02	Pittsburgh Hornets 18U AAA	18U AAA
2001–02	Pittsburgh Jr. Penguins	EmJHL	3	0	0	0	0	—	—	—	—	—
2002–03	Pittsburgh Forge	NAHL	50	2	7	9	59	—	—	—	—	—
2003–04	Dartmouth College	ECAC	34	3	22	25	57	—	—	—	—	—
2004–05	Dartmouth College	ECAC	33	5	17	22	32	—	—	—	—	—
2005–06	Dartmouth College	ECAC	29	4	11	15	53	—	—	—	—	—
2006–07	Dartmouth College	ECAC	24	1	14	15	30	—	—	—	—	—
2007–08	Chicago Wolves	AHL	43	2	14	16	44	2	0	0	0	2
2008–09	Chicago Wolves	AHL	54	0	22	22	72	—	—	—	—	—
2008–09	Atlanta Thrashers	NHL	1	0	0	0	0	—	—	—	—	—
2009–10	Chicago Wolves	AHL	26	1	2	3	23	—	—	—	—	—
2009–10	Hershey Bears	AHL	10	0	3	3	6	1	0	0	0	0
2010–11	Milwaukee Admirals	AHL	47	8	15	23	40	11	0	4	4	18
2011–12	Lev Poprad	KHL	45	1	6	7	32	—	—	—	—	—
2012–13	Straubing Tigers	DEL	46	9	16	25	52	1	0	0	0	0
2013–14	EHC Red Bull München	DEL	47	6	18	24	38	3	0	2	2	0
2014–15	EHC Red Bull München	DEL	5	1	2	3	4	—	—	—	—	—
2015–16	EHC Liwest Black Wings Linz	AUT	8	1	4	5	6	—	—	—	—	—
AHL totals			180	11	56	67	185	14	0	4	4	20
NHL totals			1	0	0	0	0	—	—	—	—	—
KHL totals			45	1	6	7	32	—	—	—	—	—

== Awards and honors ==
Award	Year
All-ECAC Hockey Rookie Team	2003–04
All-ECAC Hockey First Team	2003–04
All-ECAC Hockey Second Team	2005–06
AHL Calder Cup	2007–08

== See also ==
- List of players who played only one game in the NHL
- List of select Jewish ice hockey players
