= List of United States political appointments across party lines =

United States presidents typically fill their Cabinets and other appointive positions with people from their own political party. The first Cabinet formed by the first president, George Washington, included some of Washington's political opponents, but later presidents adopted the practice of filling their Cabinets with members of the president's party.

Appointments across party lines are uncommon. Presidents may appoint members of a different party to high-level positions in order to reduce partisanship or improve cooperation between the political parties. Also presidents often appoint members of a different party because they need Senate confirmation for many of these positions, and at the time of appointment the Senate was controlled by the opposition party of the president. Many of the cross-partisan nominees are often moderates within their own parties.

This is a list of people appointed to high-level positions in the United States federal government by a president whose political party affiliation was different from that of the appointee. The list includes executive branch appointees and independent agency appointees. Independent or nonpartisan appointees, nominally apolitical appointments (such as Article III judges and military officers), and members of explicitly bipartisan commissions are not included. A third party member has never been an appointee.

== List of appointees ==
Appointee		Position	Term ↑	President	
Name	Party	Position	Term ↑	Name	Party
Joseph Habersham	Federalist	Postmaster General	1801‡	Thomas Jefferson	Democratic-Republican
Rufus King	Federalist	Minister to Britain	1801–1803‡	Thomas Jefferson	Democratic-Republican
James Bayard	Federalist	Treaty of Ghent peace commissioner	1814	James Madison	Democratic-Republican
Richard Rush	Federalist	Comptroller of the Treasury	1811–1814	James Madison	Democratic-Republican
Richard Rush	Federalist	Attorney General	1814–1817	James Madison	Democratic-Republican
Lewis Cass	Democratic	Ambassador to France	1841–1842‡	William Henry Harrison	Whig
Joseph Holt	Republican	Commissioner of Patents	1857–1859	James Buchanan	Democratic
Joseph Holt	Republican	Postmaster General	1859–1860	James Buchanan	Democratic
Joseph Holt	Republican	Secretary of War	1861	James Buchanan	Democratic
Andrew Johnson (Note: Johnson was an 1864 vice-presidential running mate, the 16th Vice President of the United States of America, and the 17th President of the United States of America (1865). With the exception of Gerald Ford and Nelson Rockefeller, vice presidents are elected and not appointed. Abraham Lincoln and Johnson ran as members of the National Union Party and not as a Republican and a Democrat.)	Democratic	Military Governor of Tennessee	1862–1865	Abraham Lincoln	Republican
George B. McClellan	Democratic	Commanding General of the United States Army	1861–1862	Abraham Lincoln	Republican
Henry Connelly	Democratic	Governor of the Territory of New Mexico	1861–1865	Abraham Lincoln	Republican
George Foster Shepley	Democratic	Military Governor of Louisiana	1862–1864	Abraham Lincoln	Republican
John S. Phelps	Democratic	Military Governor of Arkansas	1862	Abraham Lincoln	Republican
Edwin M. Stanton	Democratic	Secretary of War	1862–1865	Abraham Lincoln	Republican
Daniel Sickles	Democratic	Special Minister to the South American Republics	1865	Abraham Lincoln	Republican
James Harlan	Republican	Secretary of the Interior	1865–1866	Andrew Johnson	Democratic/National Unionist
Henry Stanbery	Republican	Attorney General	1866–1868	Andrew Johnson	Democratic/National Unionist
Alexander W. Randall	Republican	Postmaster General	1866–1869	Andrew Johnson	Democratic/National Unionist
Orville H. Browning	Republican	Secretary of the Interior	1866–1869	Andrew Johnson	Democratic/National Unionist
John M. Schofield	Republican	Secretary of War	1868–1869	Andrew Johnson	Democratic/National Unionist
William M. Evarts	Republican	Attorney General	1868–1869	Andrew Johnson	Democratic/National Unionist
Daniel Sickles	Democratic	Minister to Spain	1869–1873	Ulysses S. Grant	Republican
George Bancroft	Democratic	Minister to Germany	1869–1874‡	Ulysses S. Grant	Republican
James Lawrence Orr	Democratic	Minister to Russia	1872–1873	Ulysses S. Grant	Republican
Caleb Cushing	Democratic	Minister to Spain	1874–1877	Ulysses S. Grant	Republican
David M. Key	Democratic	Postmaster General	1877–1880	Rutherford B. Hayes	Republican
Allen G. Thurman	Democratic	Paris international monetary conference	1881	James A. Garfield	Republican
William Rosecrans	Democratic	Register of the Treasury	1889–1893‡	Benjamin Harrison	Republican
Walter Q. Gresham	Republican	Secretary of State	1893–1895‡	Grover Cleveland	Democratic
Theodore Roosevelt	Republican	Civil Service Commissioner	1893–1895‡	Grover Cleveland	Democratic
Edward S. Bragg	Democratic	Consul General in Havana	1902	Theodore Roosevelt	Republican
Edward S. Bragg	Democratic	Consul General in Hong Kong	1903–1906	Theodore Roosevelt	Republican
Luke E. Wright	Democratic	Secretary of War	1908–1909	Theodore Roosevelt	Republican
Francis Cockrell	Democratic	Interstate Commerce Commissioner	1905–1910	Theodore Roosevelt	Republican
Jacob M. Dickinson	Democratic	Secretary of War	1909–1911	William Howard Taft	Republican
Elihu Root	Republican	Ambassador extraordinary, mission to Russia	1917	Woodrow Wilson	Democratic
Edmund Platt	Republican	Vice Chair of the Federal Reserve	1920–1921	Woodrow Wilson	Democratic
Daniel Richard Crissinger	Democratic	Chairman of the Federal Reserve	1923	Warren Harding	Republican
Theodore Roosevelt Jr.	Republican	Governor-General of the Philippines	1933‡	Franklin Roosevelt	Democratic
Hugh R. Wilson	Republican	Ambassador to Switzerland	1933–1937‡	Franklin Roosevelt	Democratic
Hugh R. Wilson	Republican	Assistant Secretary of State	1937–1938	Franklin Roosevelt	Democratic
Hugh R. Wilson	Republican	Ambassador to Germany	1938	Franklin Roosevelt	Democratic
William M. Jardine	Republican	Ambassador to Egypt	1933‡	Franklin Roosevelt	Democratic
William H. Woodin	Republican	Secretary of the Treasury	1933	Franklin Roosevelt	Democratic
Marriner S. Eccles	Republican	Chairman of the Federal Reserve	1933–1948	Franklin Roosevelt	Democratic
Charles Edison	Republican	Assistant Secretary of the Navy	1937–1940	Franklin Roosevelt	Democratic
Henry Stimson	Republican	Secretary of War	1940–1945	Franklin Roosevelt	Democratic
Robert P. Patterson	Republican	Under Secretary of War	1940–1945	Franklin Roosevelt	Democratic
Frank Knox	Republican	Secretary of the Navy	1940–1944	Franklin Roosevelt	Democratic
Nelson Rockefeller	Republican	Coordinator of the Office of Inter-American Affairs	1940–1944	Franklin Roosevelt	Democratic
Nelson Rockefeller	Republican	Assistant Secretary of State for American Republic Affairs	1944–1945	Franklin Roosevelt	Democratic
Fiorello La Guardia	Republican	Office of Civilian Defense	1941	Franklin Roosevelt	Democratic
William Donovan	Republican	Head of the Office of the Coordinator of Information	1941–1942	Franklin Roosevelt	Democratic
William Donovan	Republican	Head of the Office of Strategic Services	1942–1945	Franklin Roosevelt	Democratic
Patrick J. Hurley	Republican	Minister to New Zealand	1942	Franklin Roosevelt	Democratic
Patrick J. Hurley	Republican	Ambassador to China	1945	Franklin Roosevelt	Democratic
John Gilbert Winant	Republican	Ambassador to Britain	1941–1946	Franklin Roosevelt	Democratic
John Gilbert Winant	Republican	U.S. Representative to UNESCO	1946	Harry S. Truman	Democratic
Robert P. Patterson	Republican	Secretary of War	1945–1947	Harry S. Truman	Democratic
Lewis Strauss	Republican	Member of the Atomic Energy Commission	1946–1950	Harry S. Truman	Democratic
Herbert Hoover (Note: Herbert Hoover was also appointed to be Administrator of the United States Food Administration from 1917–1919 by Democratic President Woodrow Wilson, but this was not a cross-party appointment because Hoover did not declare his allegiance to the Republican Party until 1920.)	Republican	Chairman of the Commission on Organization of the Executive Branch of the Government (Hoover Commission)	1947	Harry S. Truman	Democratic
Warren Austin	Republican	Ambassador to the United Nations	1947–1953	Harry S. Truman	Democratic
Thomas B. McCabe	Republican	Chairman of the Federal Reserve	1948–1951	Harry S. Truman	Democratic
John Sherman Cooper	Republican	U.S. Delegate to the United Nations General Assembly	1949–1952	Harry S. Truman	Democratic
Robert A. Lovett	Republican	Secretary of Defense	1951–1953	Harry S. Truman	Democratic
Martin Patrick Durkin	Democratic	Secretary of Labor	1953	Dwight Eisenhower	Republican
Walter F. George	Democratic	Special Ambassador to NATO	1957	Dwight Eisenhower	Republican
William McChesney Martin	Democratic	Chairman of the Federal Reserve	1955–1961‡	Dwight Eisenhower	Republican
Robert Bernard Anderson	Democratic	Secretary of Navy	1953–1954	Dwight Eisenhower	Republican
Robert Bernard Anderson	Democratic	Deputy Secretary of Defense	1954–1957	Dwight Eisenhower	Republican
Robert Bernard Anderson	Democratic	Secretary of the Treasury	1957–1961	Dwight Eisenhower	Republican
Robert McNamara	Republican	Secretary of Defense	1961–1968	John F. Kennedy	Democratic
C. Douglas Dillon	Republican	Secretary of the Treasury	1961–1965	John F. Kennedy	Democratic
John McCone	Republican	Director of Central Intelligence	1961–1965	John F. Kennedy	Democratic
McGeorge Bundy	Republican	National Security Advisor	1961–1966	John F. Kennedy	Democratic
Christian Herter	Republican	U.S. Trade Representative	1962–1966	John F. Kennedy	Democratic
Henry Cabot Lodge Jr.	Republican	Ambassador to South Vietnam	1963–1964	John F. Kennedy	Democratic
Henry Cabot Lodge Jr.	Republican	Ambassador to South Vietnam	1965–1967	Lyndon B. Johnson	Democratic
Henry Cabot Lodge Jr.	Republican	Ambassador-at-large	1967–1968	Lyndon B. Johnson	Democratic
Henry Cabot Lodge Jr.	Republican	Ambassador to West Germany	1968–1969	Lyndon B. Johnson	Democratic
John W. Gardner	Republican	Secretary of Health and Human Services	1965–1968	Lyndon B. Johnson	Democratic
Jack Vaughn	Republican	Director of the Peace Corps	1966–1969	Lyndon B. Johnson	Democratic
Edward Brooke	Republican	Member of the National Advisory Commission on Civil Disorders (Kerner Commission)	1967	Lyndon B. Johnson	Democratic
John Lindsay	Republican	Vice Chairman of the National Advisory Commission on Civil Disorders (Kerner Commission)	1967	Lyndon B. Johnson	Democratic
William McCulloch	Republican	Member of the National Advisory Commission on Civil Disorders (Kerner Commission)	1967	Lyndon B. Johnson	Democratic
Erwin Griswold	Republican	Solicitor General	1967–1969	Lyndon B. Johnson	Democratic
William H. Brown III	Republican	Equal Employment Opportunity Commissioner	1968–1969	Lyndon B. Johnson	Democratic
Sargent Shriver	Democratic	Ambassador to France	1969–1970‡	Richard Nixon	Republican
Elizabeth Hanford	Democratic (Note: Appointee was a Democrat at the beginning of this tenure.)	Deputy Assistant to president for Consumer Affairs	1969–1973	Richard Nixon	Republican
Elizabeth Hanford	Democratic	Federal Trade Commissioner	1973–1977	Richard Nixon	Republican
Paul Volcker	Democratic	Under Secretary of the Treasury for International Monetary Affairs	1969–1974	Richard Nixon	Republican
John Connally	Democratic	Secretary of the Treasury	1971–1972	Richard Nixon	Republican
Peter J. Brennan	Democratic	Secretary of Labor	1973–1975	Richard Nixon	Republican
George W. Mitchell	Democratic	Vice Chair of the Federal Reserve	1973–1974	Richard Nixon	Republican
Armistead I. Selden Jr.	Democratic	Ambassador to Fiji	1974–1977	Richard Nixon	Republican
Daniel Patrick Moynihan	Democratic	Assistant for Urban Affairs	1969–1970	Richard Nixon	Republican
Daniel Patrick Moynihan	Democratic	Ambassador to India	1973–1975		
Daniel Patrick Moynihan	Democratic	Ambassador to India	1973–1975	Gerald Ford	Republican
Daniel Patrick Moynihan	Democratic	Ambassador to the United Nations	1975–1976	Gerald Ford	Republican
Armistead I. Selden Jr.	Democratic	Ambassador to New Zealand and Samoa	1974–1977	Gerald Ford	Republican
Togo D. West Jr.	Democratic	Associate Deputy Attorney General	1975–1976	Gerald Ford	Republican
Robert Casey	Democratic	Federal Maritime Commissioner	1976–1977	Gerald Ford	Republican
James Schlesinger	Republican	Secretary of Energy	1977–1979	Jimmy Carter	Democratic
Lawrence Eagleburger	Republican	Ambassador to Yugoslavia	1977–1981	Jimmy Carter	Democratic
Kingman Brewster Jr.	Republican	Ambassador to the United Kingdom	1977–1981	Jimmy Carter	Democratic
William H. Webster	Republican	Director of the FBI	1978–1981	Jimmy Carter	Democratic
Frank Carlucci	Republican	Deputy Director of the CIA	1978–1981	Jimmy Carter	Democratic
Mike Mansfield	Democratic	Ambassador to Japan	1981–1988‡	Ronald Reagan	Republican
Paul Volcker	Democratic	Chairman of the Federal Reserve	1983–1987‡	Ronald Reagan	Republican
Jeane Kirkpatrick	Democratic	Ambassador to the United Nations	1981–1985	Ronald Reagan	Republican
William Bennett	Democratic	Chair of the National Endowment for the Humanities	1981–1985	Ronald Reagan	Republican
William Bennett	Democratic	Secretary of Education	1985–1988	Ronald Reagan	Republican
R. James Woolsey Jr.	Democratic	Delegate at Large to the U.S.-Soviet Strategic Arms Reduction Talks	1983–1986	Ronald Reagan	Republican
R. James Woolsey Jr.	Democratic	Delegate to the Nuclear and Space Arms Talks	1986–1987	Ronald Reagan	Republican
Paul Nitze	Democratic	Chief Negotiator of the Intermediate-Range Nuclear Forces Treaty	1981–1984	Ronald Reagan	Republican
Eric J. Fygi	Democratic	Deputy General Counsel of the Department of Energy	1981–1989‡	Ronald Reagan	Republican
Max Kampelman	Democratic	Ambassador to the Conference on Security and Cooperation in Europe	1981–1983‡	Ronald Reagan	Republican
Max Kampelman	Democratic	Delegation to the Negotiations with the Soviet Union on Nuclear and Space Arms in Geneva	1985–1989	Ronald Reagan	Republican
Max Kampelman	Democratic	Counselor to the Department of State	1987–1989	Ronald Reagan	Republican
Richard Stone	Democratic	Ambassadors-at-large and Special Envoy to Central America	1983–1984	Ronald Reagan	Republican
Preston Robert Tisch	Democratic	Postmaster General	1986–1988	Ronald Reagan	Republican
John P. LaWare	Democratic	Federal Reserve Board of Governors	1988–1989	Ronald Reagan	Republican
Lauro Cavazos	Democratic	Secretary of Education	1988–1990	Ronald Reagan	Republican
Lauro Cavazos	Democratic	Secretary of Education	1988–1990	George H. W. Bush	Republican
Dennis B. Ross	Democratic	Director of the State Department's Policy Planning Staff	1989–1992	George H. W. Bush	Republican
Eric J. Fygi	Democratic	Deputy General Counsel of the Department of Energy	1989–1993‡	George H. W. Bush	Republican
Griffin Bell	Democratic	Commission on Federal Ethics Law Reform	1989	George H. W. Bush	Republican
William Hathaway	Democratic	Federal Maritime Commissioner	1990–1993	George H. W. Bush	Republican
Robert Strauss	Democratic	Ambassador to Soviet Union/Russia	1991–1992	George H. W. Bush	Republican
Diane Ravitch	Democratic	Assistant Secretary of Education	1991–1993	George H. W. Bush	Republican
Richard Stone	Democratic	Ambassador to Denmark	1992–1993	George H. W. Bush	Republican
Michael Chertoff	Republican	Attorney for the District of New Jersey	1993–1994‡	Bill Clinton	Democratic
William S. Sessions	Republican	Director of the Federal Bureau of Investigation	1993‡	Bill Clinton	Democratic
David Gergen	Republican	Counselor to the President	1993–1993	Bill Clinton	Democratic
Sheila Bair	Republican	Chair of the Commodity Futures Trading Commission Acting	1993	Bill Clinton	Democratic
Roger W. Johnson	Republican	GSA Administrator	1993–1996	Bill Clinton	Democratic
Louis Freeh	Republican	Director of the Federal Bureau of Investigation	1993–2001	Bill Clinton	Democratic
John Negroponte	Republican	Ambassador to the Philippines	1993–1996	Bill Clinton	Democratic
William J. Crowe	Republican	Chair of the President's Intelligence Advisory Board	1993–1994	Bill Clinton	Democratic
William J. Crowe	Republican	Ambassador to the United Kingdom	1994–1997	Bill Clinton	Democratic
Julie Belaga	Republican	Board of Directors of the Export Import Bank	1994–1999	Bill Clinton	Democratic
Marc L. Marks	Republican	Federal Mine Safety and Health Review Commissioner	1994–2000	Bill Clinton	Democratic
John Hamre	Republican	Comptroller of the Department of Defense	1994–1997	Bill Clinton	Democratic
John Hamre	Republican	Deputy Secretary of Defense	1997–2000	Bill Clinton	Democratic
Alan Greenspan	Republican	Chairman of the Federal Reserve	1995–2001‡	Bill Clinton	Democratic
William Cohen	Republican	Secretary of Defense	1997–2001	Bill Clinton	Democratic
Robert Mueller	Republican	Attorney for the Northern District of California	1998–2001	Bill Clinton	Democratic
David M. Walker	Republican	Comptroller General of the United States	1998–2001	Bill Clinton	Democratic
John DiIulio	Democratic	Director of the Office of Faith-Based and Community Initiatives	2001	George W. Bush	Republican
George McGovern	Democratic	Ambassador to the United Nations Agencies for Food and Agriculture	2001‡	George W. Bush	Republican
Richard Swett	Democratic	Ambassador to Denmark	2001‡	George W. Bush	Republican
John Marburger	Democratic	Director of the Office of Science and Technology Policy	2001–2009	George W. Bush	Republican
Tom Schieffer	Democratic	Ambassador to Australia	2001–2005	George W. Bush	Republican
Tom Schieffer	Democratic	Ambassador to Japan	2005–2009	George W. Bush	Republican
Eric J. Fygi	Democratic	Deputy General Counsel of the Department of Energy	2001–2009‡	George W. Bush	Republican
Norman Mineta	Democratic	Secretary of Transportation	2001–2006	George W. Bush	Republican
Richard Carmona	Democratic	Surgeon General	2002–2006	George W. Bush	Republican
Tony P. Hall	Democratic	Ambassador to the United Nations Agencies for Food and Agriculture	2002–2006	George W. Bush	Republican
Paul McHale	Democratic	Assistant Secretary of Defense for Homeland Defense	2003–2009	George W. Bush	Republican
Gracia Hillman	Democratic	Election Assistance Commissioner	2003–2009	George W. Bush	Republican
Pam Iovino	Democratic	Assistant VA Secretary for Congressional and Legislative Affairs	2004–2005	George W. Bush	Republican
Joseph E. Brennan	Democratic	Federal Maritime Commissioner	2004–2009‡	George W. Bush	Republican
Christine Griffin	Democratic	Equal Employment Opportunity Commissioner	2005–2009	George W. Bush	Republican
R. David Paulison	Democratic	Federal Emergency Management Agency	2005–2009	George W. Bush	Republican
Pete Geren	Democratic	Acting Secretary of the Air Force	2005	George W. Bush	Republican
Pete Geren	Democratic	Secretary of the Army	2006–2009	George W. Bush	Republican
Zell Miller	Democratic	American Battle Monuments Commission member	2005–2009	George W. Bush	Republican
Lanny Davis	Democratic	Privacy and Civil Liberties Oversight Board	2006–2007	George W. Bush	Republican
Diane Farrell	Democratic	Board of Directors of the Export Import Bank	2007–2009	George W. Bush	Republican
Lois Lerner	Democratic	Director Exempt Organizations	2006–2009	George W. Bush	Republican
Neel Kashkari	Republican	Assistant Secretary of the Treasury for Financial Stability	2009‡	Barack Obama	Democratic
Michael B. Donley	Republican	Secretary of the Air Force	2009–2013‡	Barack Obama	Democratic
Robert Mueller	Republican	Director of the Federal Bureau of Investigation	2009–2013‡	Barack Obama	Democratic
Ray LaHood	Republican	Secretary of Transportation	2009–2013	Barack Obama	Democratic
Robert Gates	Republican	Secretary of Defense	2009–2011‡	Barack Obama	Democratic
Jon Huntsman Jr.	Republican	Ambassador to China	2009–2011	Barack Obama	Democratic
Dan Rooney	Republican	Ambassador to Ireland	2009–2012	Barack Obama	Democratic
Douglas Kmiec	Republican	Ambassador to Malta	2009–2011	Barack Obama	Democratic
John M. McHugh	Republican	Secretary of the Army	2009–2015	Barack Obama	Democratic
Jim Leach	Republican	Chair of the National Endowment for the Humanities	2009–2013	Barack Obama	Democratic
Chuck Hagel	Republican	Co-chair of President's Intelligence Advisory Board	2009–2013	Barack Obama	Democratic
Chuck Hagel	Republican	Secretary of Defense	2013–2015	Barack Obama	Democratic
Larry Pressler	Republican	U.S. Commission for the Preservation of America's Heritage Abroad	2009–2014	Barack Obama	Democratic
Ben Bernanke	Republican	Chairman of the Federal Reserve	2009–2014‡	Barack Obama	Democratic
Connie Morella	Republican	American Battle Monuments Commission member	2010–2017	Barack Obama	Democratic
Jeff Immelt	Republican	Chairperson of the President's Council on Jobs and Competitiveness	2011–2013	Barack Obama	Democratic
Jerome Powell	Republican	Federal Reserve Board of Governors	2012–2017	Barack Obama	Democratic
James Comey	Republican	Director of the Federal Bureau of Investigation	2013–2017	Barack Obama	Democratic
Sloan D. Gibson	Republican	United States Deputy Secretary of Veterans Affairs	2014–2017	Barack Obama	Democratic
Robert A. McDonald	Republican	Secretary of Veterans Affairs	2014–2017	Barack Obama	Democratic
Michael Flynn	Democratic	National Security Advisor	2017	Donald Trump	Republican
Gary Cohn	Democratic	Director of the National Economic Council	2017–2018	Donald Trump	Republican
Ivanka Trump	Democratic	Advisor to the President	2017–2021	Donald Trump	Republican
Peter Navarro	Democratic	Director of the National Trade Council	2017	Donald Trump	Republican
Peter Navarro	Democratic	Director of the Office of Trade and Manufacturing Policy	2017–2021	Donald Trump	Republican
Robert O. Work	Democratic	Deputy Secretary of Defense	2017‡	Donald Trump	Republican
Eric J. Fygi	Democratic	Deputy General Counsel of the Department of Energy	2017–2021‡	Donald Trump	Republican
Dan Maffei	Democratic	Federal Maritime Commissioner	2019–2021‡	Donald Trump	Republican
Christopher A. Wray	Republican	Director of the Federal Bureau of Investigation	2021–2025‡	Joe Biden	Democratic
David Norquist	Republican	United States Deputy Secretary of Defense	2021‡	Joe Biden	Democratic
David Pekoske	Republican	Administrator Transportation Security Administration	2021–2025‡	Joe Biden	Democratic
Zalmay Khalilzad	Republican	U.S. Special Representative for Afghanistan Reconciliation	2021‡	Joe Biden	Democratic
John J. Sullivan	Republican	Ambassador to Russia	2021–2022‡	Joe Biden	Democratic
Jeff Flake	Republican	Ambassador to Turkey	2022–2024	Joe Biden	Democratic
Cindy McCain	Republican	Ambassador to the United Nations Agencies for Food and Agriculture	2021–2023	Joe Biden	Democratic
Jerome Powell	Republican	Chairman of the Federal Reserve	2021–2026‡	Joe Biden	Democratic
Meg Whitman	Republican	Ambassador to Kenya	2022–2024	Joe Biden	Democratic
Michael B. Donley	Republican	Director of Administration and Management	2021–2023	Joe Biden	Democratic

‡ Person was an appointee of the previous administration and was reappointed or retained by the President.

== Other notable appointments that crossed party lines ==
- President Thomas Jefferson, a Democratic-Republican, appointed William Cranch, a Federalist, as Chief Judge of the United States Circuit Court of the District of Columbia.
- President Thomas Jefferson, a Democratic-Republican, asked Charles Lee, a Federalist, to be appointed Associate Justice of the Supreme Court of the United States.
- President John Quincy Adams, a Democratic-Republican, appointed Joseph Hopkinson, a Federalist, as a U.S. federal judge on the United States District Court for the Eastern District of Pennsylvania.
- President Franklin Pierce, a Democrat, appointed Isaac Blackford, a Whig, as a judge on the United States Court of Claims.
- President Abraham Lincoln, a Republican, appointed Stephen Field, a Democrat, as Associate Justice of the Supreme Court of the United States.
- President Andrew Johnson, a Democrat, appointed Samuel Blatchford, a Republican, as Judge on the United States District Court for the Southern District of New York.
- President Andrew Johnson, a Democrat, appointed Daniel Clark, a Republican, as Judge on the United States District Court for the District of New Hampshire.
- President Rutherford B. Hayes, a Republican, appointed David M. Key, a Democrat, as Judge on the United States District Courts for the Eastern and Middle Districts of Tennessee.
- President Benjamin Harrison, a Republican, appointed Howell Edmunds Jackson, a Democrat, as Associate Justice of the Supreme Court of the United States.
- President William Howard Taft, a Republican, appointed Horace Harmon Lurton, a Democrat, as Associate Justice of the Supreme Court of the United States.
- President William Howard Taft, a Republican, appointed Edward Douglass White, a Democrat, as Chief Justice of the United States.
- President William Howard Taft, a Republican, appointed Joseph Rucker Lamar, a Democrat, as Associate Justice of the Supreme Court of the United States.
- President Warren G. Harding, a Republican, appointed Pierce Butler, a Democrat, as Associate Justice of the Supreme Court of the United States.
- President Calvin Coolidge, a Republican, appointed John Ellis Martineau, a Democrat, as Judge on the United States District Court for the Eastern District of Arkansas.
- President Herbert Hoover, a Republican, appointed Benjamin N. Cardozo, a prominent Democrat, as Associate Justice of the Supreme Court of the United States.
- President Herbert Hoover, a Republican, appointed Eugene Black, a Democrat, as a member of the U.S. Board of Tax Appeals.
- President Franklin D. Roosevelt, a Democrat, appointed Harlan F. Stone, a Republican, as Chief Justice of the United States.
- President Franklin D. Roosevelt, a Democrat, appointed Robert P. Patterson, a Republican, as Judge of the United States Court of Appeals for the Second Circuit.
- President Franklin D. Roosevelt, a Democrat, appointed William Clark, a Republican, as Judge of the United States Court of Appeals for the Third Circuit.
- President Franklin D. Roosevelt, a Democrat, appointed Duncan Lawrence Groner, a Republican, as Chief Justice of the United States Court of Appeals for the District of Columbia Circuit.
- President Harry S. Truman, a Democrat, appointed U.S. Senator Harold Hitz Burton, a Republican, as Associate Justice of the Supreme Court of the United States.
- President Harry S. Truman, a Democrat, appointed Ernest W. Gibson Jr., a Republican, as a U.S. federal judge on the United States District Court for the District of Vermont.
- President Dwight D. Eisenhower, a Republican, appointed William J. Brennan Jr., a Democrat, as Associate Justice of the Supreme Court of the United States.
- President Dwight D. Eisenhower, a Republican, appointed J. Joseph Smith, a Democrat, as a judge of the United States Court of Appeals for the Second Circuit.
- President Dwight D. Eisenhower, a Republican, appointed Clement Haynsworth, a Democrat, as a judge of the United States Court of Appeals for the Fourth Circuit.
- President Dwight D. Eisenhower, a Republican, appointed Eugene Worley, a Democrat, as chief judge of the United States Court of Customs and Patent Appeals.
- President John F. Kennedy, a Democrat, appointed Harold R. Tyler Jr., a Republican, as a U.S. federal judge on the United States District Court for the Southern District of New York.
- President Richard Nixon, a Republican, appointed Donald S. Russell, a former U.S. senator and Democrat, as judge of the United States Court of Appeals for the Fourth Circuit.
- President Richard Nixon, a Republican, appointed Walter R. Mansfield, a Democrat, as judge of the United States Court of Appeals for the Second Circuit.
- President Richard Nixon, a Republican, appointed Charles Clark, a Democrat, as judge of the United States Court of Appeals for the Fifth Circuit.
- President Richard Nixon, a Republican, nominated Clement Haynsworth, a Democrat, as Associate Justice of the Supreme Court of the United States.
- President Richard Nixon, a Republican, appointed Lewis F. Powell Jr., a lifelong Democrat, as Associate Justice of the Supreme Court of the United States.
- President Gerald Ford, a Republican, appointed Terry Shell, a Democrat, as Judge on the United States District Courts for the Eastern and Western Districts of Arkansas.
- President Jimmy Carter, a Democrat, appointed Frank Minis Johnson, a Republican, as judge of the United States Court of Appeals for the Fifth Circuit.
- President Jimmy Carter, a Democrat, appointed Cornelia Groefsema Kennedy, a Republican, as judge of the United States Court of Appeals for the Sixth Circuit.
- President Jimmy Carter, a Democrat, appointed Otto Richard Skopil Jr., a Republican, as judge of the United States Court of Appeals for the Ninth Circuit.
- President Ronald Reagan, a Republican, appointed U.S. Representative Sam B. Hall Jr., a Democrat, as Judge on the United States District Court for the Eastern District of Texas.
- President Ronald Reagan, a Republican, appointed Kimba Wood, a Democrat, as Judge on the United States District Court for the Southern District of New York.
- President George H. W. Bush, a Republican, appointed Sonia Sotomayor, a Democrat, as Judge on the United States District Court for the Southern District of New York.
- President Bill Clinton, a Democrat, appointed Maryanne Trump Barry, a Republican, as judge of the United States Court of Appeals for the Third Circuit.
- President Bill Clinton, a Democrat, appointed Richard C. Tallman, a Republican, as judge of the United States Court of Appeals for the Ninth Circuit.
- President Bill Clinton, a Democrat, appointed Stanley Marcus, a Republican, as judge of the United States Court of Appeals for the Eleventh Circuit.
- President Bill Clinton, a Democrat, appointed Yvette Kane, a Republican, as a U.S. federal judge on the United States District Court for the Middle District of Pennsylvania.
- President Bill Clinton, a Democrat, appointed Richard Barclay Surrick, a Republican, as a U.S. federal judge on the United States District Court for the Eastern District of Pennsylvania.
- President Bill Clinton, a Democrat, nominated Admiral Bobby Ray Inman, a Republican, as Secretary of Defense.
- President Bill Clinton, a Democrat, nominated Governor of Massachusetts William Weld, a Republican, as United States ambassador to Mexico.
- President George W. Bush, a Republican, appointed Philip Ray Martinez, a Democrat, as a U.S. federal judge on the United States District Court for the Western District of Texas.
- President George W. Bush, a Republican, appointed C. Darnell Jones II, a Democrat, as a U.S. federal judge on the United States District Court for the Eastern District of Pennsylvania.
- President George W. Bush, a Republican, appointed Legrome D. Davis, a Democrat, as a U.S. federal judge on the United States District Court for the Eastern District of Pennsylvania.
- President George W. Bush, a Republican, appointed Timothy J. Savage, a Democrat, as a U.S. federal judge on the United States District Court for the Eastern District of Pennsylvania.
- President George W. Bush, a Republican, appointed David S. Cercone, a Democrat, as a U.S. federal judge on the United States District Court for the Western District of Pennsylvania.
- President George W. Bush, a Republican, appointed Freda L. Wolfson, a Democrat, as a U.S. federal judge on the United States District Court for the District of New Jersey.
- President Barack Obama, a Democrat, nominated U.S. Senator Judd Gregg, a Republican, as United States Secretary of Commerce.
- President Barack Obama, a Democrat, appointed Matthew W. Brann, a Republican, as a U.S. federal judge on the United States District Court for the Middle District of Pennsylvania.
- President Barack Obama, a Democrat, appointed Gregory N. Stivers, a Republican, as a U.S. federal judge on the United States District Court for the Western District of Kentucky.
- President Barack Obama, a Democrat, appointed Thomas M. Durkin, a Republican, as a U.S. federal judge on the United States District Court for the Northern District of Illinois.
- President Barack Obama, a Democrat, appointed John Robert Blakey, a Republican, as a U.S. federal judge on the United States District Court for the Northern District of Illinois.
- President Barack Obama, a Democrat, appointed Jeffrey L. Schmehl, a Republican, as a U.S. federal judge on the United States District Court for the Eastern District of Pennsylvania.
- President Barack Obama, a Democrat, appointed Edward G. Smith, a Republican, as a U.S. federal judge on the United States District Court for the Eastern District of Pennsylvania.
- President Barack Obama, a Democrat, appointed Jerry Pappert, a Republican, as a U.S. federal judge on the United States District Court for the Eastern District of Pennsylvania.
- President Barack Obama, a Democrat, appointed Rebecca Goodgame Ebinger, a Republican, as a U.S. federal judge on the United States District Court for the Southern District of Iowa.
- President Barack Obama, a Democrat, appointed John Tharp, a Republican, as a U.S. federal judge on the United States District Court for the Northern District of Illinois.
- President Barack Obama, a Democrat, appointed David Barlow, a Republican, as United States Attorney for the United States District Court for the District of Utah.
- President Barack Obama, a Democrat, nominated William F. Jung, a Republican, as a U.S. federal judge on the United States District Court for the Middle District of Florida.
- President Barack Obama, a Democrat, nominated Karen Gren Scholer, a Republican, as a U.S. federal judge on the United States District Court for the Eastern District of Texas.
- President Barack Obama, a Democrat, nominated Marilyn Horan, a Republican, as a U.S. federal judge on the United States District Court for the Western District of Pennsylvania.
- President Donald Trump, a Republican, nominated Nellie Liang, a Democrat, to the Federal Reserve Board of Governors.
- President Donald Trump, a Republican, appointed Susan Paradise Baxter, a Democrat, as a U.S. federal judge on the United States District Court for the Western District of Pennsylvania.
- President Donald Trump, a Republican, appointed Robert J. Colville, a Democrat, as a U.S. federal judge on the United States District Court for the Western District of Pennsylvania.
- President Donald Trump, a Republican, appointed John Milton Younge, a Democrat, as a U.S. federal judge on the United States District Court for the Eastern District of Pennsylvania.
- President Donald Trump, a Republican, appointed Lewis J. Liman, a Democrat, as a U.S. federal judge on the United States District Court for the Southern District of New York.
- President Donald Trump, a Republican, appointed Mary S. McElroy, a Democrat, as a U.S. federal judge on the United States District Court for the District of Rhode Island.
- President Donald Trump, a Republican, appointed Maryellen Noreika, a Democrat, as a U.S. federal judge on the United States District Court for the District of Delaware.
- President Donald Trump, a Republican, appointed Stephanie D. Davis, a Democrat, as a U.S. federal judge on the United States District Court for the Eastern District of Michigan.
- President Donald Trump, a Republican, nominated Hector Gonzalez, a Democrat, as a U.S. federal judge on the United States District Court for the Eastern District of New York.
- President Donald Trump, a Republican, nominated Jennifer H. Rearden, a Democrat, as a U.S. federal judge on the United States District Court for the Southern District of New York.
- President Joe Biden, a Democrat, appointed Kim Wyman, a Republican, to the Cybersecurity and Infrastructure Security Agency.
- President Joe Biden, a Democrat, appointed Kelly H. Rankin, a Republican, as a U.S. federal judge on the United States District Court for the District of Wyoming.
- President Joe Biden, a Democrat, appointed Camela C. Theeler, a Republican, as a U.S. federal judge on the United States District Court for the District of South Dakota.

== Key ==
Key to party colors and abbreviations for members of the U.S. Congress and other politicians or officials
Alaskan Independence (AKIP) Know Nothing (KN) American Labor (AL) Anti-Jacksonian (Anti-J); National Republican (NR) Anti-Administration (AA) Anti-Masonic (Anti-M) Conservative (Con) Covenant (Cov)	Democratic (D) Democratic–Farmer–Labor (DFL) Democratic–NPL (D-NPL) Dixiecrat (Dix), States' Rights (SR) Democratic-Republican (DR) Farmer–Labor (FL) Federalist (F); Pro-Administration (PA)	Free Soil (FS) Fusion (Fus) Greenback (GB) Independence (IPM) Jacksonian (J) Liberal (Lib) Libertarian (L) National Union (NU)	Nonpartisan League (NPL) Nullifier (N) Opposition Northern (O); Opposition Southern (O) Populist (Pop) Progressive (Prog) Prohibition (Proh) Readjuster (Rea)	Republican (R) Silver (Sv) Silver Republican (SvR) Socialist (Soc) Union (U) Unconditional Union (UU) Vermont Progressive (VP) Whig (W)	Independent (I) Nonpartisan (NP)
