= Slotnick =

Slotnick is a surname. Notable people with the surname include:

- Barry Slotnick (born 1939), American attorney
- Daniel Slotnick (1931–1985), American mathematician and computer architect
- Joey Slotnick (born 1968), American actor
- Stuart Slotnick (born 1969), American attorney
- Michael Slotnick (born 1982), American math teacher
