= Judge Burns =

Judge Burns may refer to:

- Ellen Bree Burns (1923–2019), judge of the United States District Court for the District of Connecticut
- James M. Burns (judge) (1924–2001), judge of the United States District Court for the District of Oregon
- Larry Alan Burns (born 1954), judge of the United States District Court for the Southern District of California
- Louis Henry Burns (1878–1928), judge of the United States District Court for the Eastern District of Louisiana
- Owen McIntosh Burns (1892–1952), judge of the United States District Court for the Western District of Pennsylvania
- Tara Burns (fl. 1990s–2020s), judge of the High Court of Ireland
- Waller Thomas Burns (1858–1917), judge of the United States District Court for the Southern District of Texas
