= Judge Conti =

Judge Conti may refer to:

- Joy Flowers Conti (born 1948), judge of the United States District Court for the Western District of Pennsylvania
- Samuel Conti (1922–2018), judge of the United States District Court for the Northern District of California

== See also ==
- Leroy John Contie Jr. (1920–2001), judge of the United States Court of Appeals for the Sixth Circuit
