= Judge Snyder =

Judge Snyder may refer to:

- Christina A. Snyder (born 1947), judge of the United States District Court for the Central District of California
- Daniel John Snyder Jr. (1916–1980), judge of the United States District Court for the Western District of Pennsylvania
- Harry G. Snyder (born 1938), judge of the Wisconsin Court of Appeals
- Leslie Crocker Snyder (born 1942), judge of the Criminal Court of the City of New York and later of the New York Court of Claims
- Judge Roy Snyder, fictional judge on The Simpsons
