= Cathy Bissoon =

American judge (born 1968)

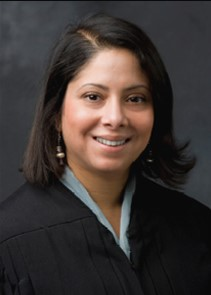

Chief Judge of the United States District Court for the Western District of Pennsylvania
- Incumbent
- Assumed office December 7, 2025
- Preceded by: Mark R. Hornak

Judge of the United States District Court for the Western District of Pennsylvania
- Incumbent
- Assumed office October 19, 2011
- Appointed by: Barack Obama
- Preceded by: Thomas Hardiman

Personal details
- Born: Cathy Castro; May 16, 1968 (age 58) New York City, New York, U.S.
- Education: Alfred University (BA); Harvard University (JD)

Cathy Bissoon (née Castro; born May 16, 1968) is the chief United States district judge of the United States District Court for the Western District of Pennsylvania. Previously, she was a United States magistrate judge of the same court. She was appointed a district judge by President Barack Obama and was confirmed by the United States Senate in October 2011.

== Early life and education ==
Bissoon was born on May 16, 1968, in Brooklyn, New York. Bissoon's father was from Puerto Rico and her mother from Trinidad. When Bissoon was four years old, her father was killed in a stabbing close to the family home in the Williamsburg neighborhood of Brooklyn. Bissoon's mother later remarried and the family moved to Queens, New York. Bissoon attended Alfred University in New York, where she graduated summa cum laude with a Bachelor of Arts in political science in 1990. She earned her Juris Doctor from Harvard Law School in 1993.

== Career ==
After completing law school, Bissoon joined the Pittsburgh, Pennsylvania, office of Reed Smith, practicing in the firm's labor and employment group. While at Reed Smith, Bissoon took a one-year leave of absence to serve as a law clerk for Judge Gary L. Lancaster of the United States District Court for the Western District of Pennsylvania. In 2007, Bissoon joined the Pittsburgh law firm of Cohen & Grigsby where she was the Director of the firm's Labor & Employment Group.

=== Federal judicial service ===
In July 2008, Bissoon was selected to serve as a United States magistrate judge of the United States District Court for the Western District of Pennsylvania, replacing Judge Francis X. Caiazza. She joined the bench on August 1, 2008, and is the first woman of color to sit on the federal bench in Pittsburgh. Bissoon, who is Hispanic and Indian, is also the first woman of Indian descent to sit on a federal court in the United States.

During the 111th Congress, Senators Arlen Specter and Bob Casey Jr. recommended Bissoon for a seat on the Western District of Pennsylvania. On November 17, 2010, President Barack Obama formally nominated Bissoon to be a United States district judge, to replace Judge Thomas Hardiman, who was elevated to the United States Court of Appeals for the Third Circuit on April 2, 2007. On October 17, 2011, the United States Senate confirmed Bissoon by an 82–3 vote. She received her commission on October 19, 2011. With her appointment, Bissoon became the first Hispanic female Article III judge in Pennsylvania and the first Asian American Article III judge in Pennsylvania. She became chief judge of the court on December 7, 2025.

== Awards and recognition ==
Bissoon was honored as one of five finalists for the 2010 Athena Award. The award honors female leaders in the region who demonstrate excellence, creativity and initiative in business, who provide time and energy to improve the quality of life of others and who actively assist other women in realizing their full leadership potential.

In 2010, Bissoon also was honored by Pittsburgh Professional Women as one of their 2010 Women of Integrity. The award is given to women who have distinguished themselves as leaders who balance career and civic responsibilities, while sharing their success by mentoring others and supporting their communities.

== See also ==
- List of Asian American jurists
- List of first women lawyers and judges in Pennsylvania
- List of first women lawyers and judges in the United States
- List of Hispanic and Latino American jurists
- List of Puerto Ricans
- List of Indian Americans

Legal offices
Preceded by Thomas Hardiman	Judge of the United States District Court for the Western District of Pennsylvania; 2011–present	Incumbent
Preceded by Mark R. Hornak	Chief Judge of the United States District Court for the Western District of Pennsylvania; 2025–present	Incumbent
