= Joseph F. Weis Jr. =

American judge (1923–2014)

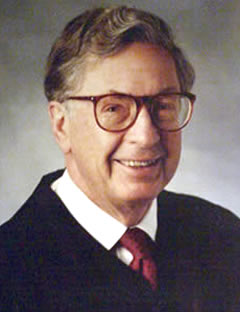

Senior Judge of the United States Court of Appeals for the Third Circuit
- In office April 1, 1988 – March 19, 2014

Judge of the United States Court of Appeals for the Third Circuit
- In office March 15, 1973 – April 1, 1988
- Appointed by: Richard Nixon
- Preceded by: Abraham Lincoln Freedman
- Succeeded by: Richard Lowell Nygaard

Judge of the United States District Court for the Western District of Pennsylvania
- In office April 24, 1970 – March 27, 1973
- Appointed by: Richard Nixon
- Preceded by: Joseph Putnam Willson
- Succeeded by: Daniel John Snyder Jr.

Personal details
- Born: Joseph F. Weis Jr. March 12, 1923 Pittsburgh, Pennsylvania
- Died: March 19, 2014 (aged 91) Fox Chapel, Pennsylvania
- Education: Duquesne University (BA); University of Pittsburgh School of Law (JD)

Joseph Francis Weis Jr. (March 12, 1923 – March 19, 2014) was a United States circuit judge of the United States Court of Appeals for the Third Circuit and previously was a United States district judge of the United States District Court for the Western District of Pennsylvania.

== Education and career ==
Born March 12, 1923, in Pittsburgh, Pennsylvania, Weis received a Bachelor of Arts degree in 1947 from Duquesne University and a Juris Doctor in 1950 from the University of Pittsburgh School of Law. He served in the United States Army as a Captain from 1943 to 1948. He was in private practice in Pittsburgh from 1950 to 1968. He was a Judge of the Court of Common Pleas in Allegheny County, Pennsylvania from 1968 to 1970.

== Federal judicial service ==
Weis was nominated by President Richard Nixon on March 11, 1970, to a seat on the United States District Court for the Western District of Pennsylvania vacated by Judge Joseph Putnam Willson. He was confirmed by the United States Senate on April 23, 1970, and received his commission on April 24, 1970. His service terminated on March 27, 1973, due to elevation to the Third Circuit.

Weis was nominated by President Nixon on February 13, 1973, to a seat on the United States Court of Appeals for the Third Circuit vacated by Judge Abraham Lincoln Freedman. He was confirmed by the Senate on March 14, 1973, and received his commission on March 15, 1973. He assumed senior status on April 1, 1988. His service terminated on March 19, 2014, due to his death.

Concurrent with his federal judicial service, Weis was an adjunct professor at the University of Pittsburgh School of Law starting in 1986.

== Death ==
Weis died at Fox Chapel, Pennsylvania on March 19, 2014, and was buried alongside his wife Margaret at Arlington National Cemetery on September 12, 2014.

== Awards and achievements ==
Bronze Star for Valor; Purple Heart with oak leaf cluster; Edward J. Devitt Distinguished Service to Justice Award; History Makers Award, Historical Society of Western Pennsylvania; Award for Judicial Leadership and Excellence; Legion of Honour, President of the French Republic.

In 2015 the United States Courthouse on Grant Street in Weis's hometown of Pittsburgh was renamed in his honor after the passage of federal legislation and the signature of President Barack Obama. The building, named the Joseph F. Weis Jr. United States Courthouse, serves the Western Pennsylvania District Court and the United States Court of Appeals for the Third Circuit.

== See also ==
- List of United States federal judges by longevity of service

== Sources ==
Legal offices
| Preceded by Joseph Putnam Willson | Judge of the United States District Court for the Western District of Pennsylvania; 1970–1973 | Succeeded by Daniel John Snyder Jr. |
| Preceded by Abraham Lincoln Freedman | Judge of the United States Court of Appeals for the Third Circuit; 1973–1988 | Succeeded by Richard Lowell Nygaard |
