= Susan Paradise Baxter =

American judge (born 1956)

Susan Baxter
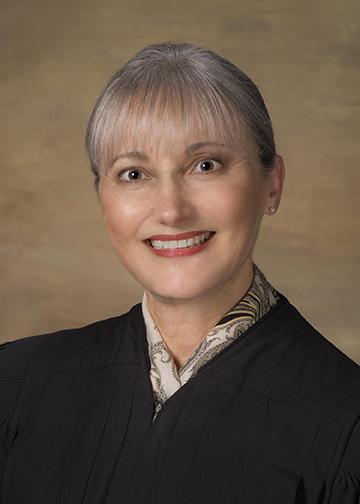

Judge of the United States District Court for the Western District of Pennsylvania
- Incumbent
- Assumed office September 10, 2018
- Appointed by: Donald Trump
- Preceded by: Sean J. McLaughlin

Chief Magistrate Judge of the United States District Court for the Western District of Pennsylvania
- In office 2005–2009

Magistrate Judge of the United States District Court for the Western District of Pennsylvania
- In office January 20, 1995 – September 10, 2018
- Succeeded by: Richard A. Lanzillo

Personal details
- Born: Susan Rose Paradise; September 20, 1956 (age 69) Latrobe, Pennsylvania, U.S.
- Party: Democratic
- Education: Pennsylvania State University (BS); Temple University (MEd, JD)

Susan Rose Paradise Baxter (née Paradise; born September 20, 1956) is a United States district judge of the United States District Court for the Western District of Pennsylvania. She was formerly a United States magistrate judge of the same court.

== Early life and education ==
Susan Paradise Baxter was born September 20, 1956, in Latrobe, Pennsylvania. She received her Bachelor of Science from Pennsylvania State University in 1978, her Master of Education from Temple University in 1980, and her Juris Doctor from the Temple University Beasley School of Law in 1983.

== Professional career ==
She began her practice in Washington, D.C., as an associate at the firm of Cole, Raywid and Braverman, now Davis Wright Tremaine, where she became a partner in 1989. Her practice consisted of commercial law, antitrust litigation and contract law.

In 1992, she served as the Court Solicitor for the Erie County Court of Common Pleas, representing the judges on the court.

== Federal judicial service ==
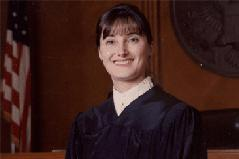
Baxter as Chief Magistrate Judge

She became a United States magistrate judge for the United States District Court for the Western District of Pennsylvania on January 20, 1995. Later in 1996, she was elected the Director-At-Large of the Federal Magistrate Judges Association. She became the chief magistrate judge in June 2005 and served until 2009. Her tenure as a magistrate judge ended on September 10, 2018, when she became a district judge.

=== Expired district court nomination under Obama ===
On July 30, 2015, President Barack Obama nominated Baxter to serve as a United States District Judge of the United States District Court for the Western District of Pennsylvania, to the seat vacated by Sean J. McLaughlin, who resigned on August 16, 2013. She received a hearing before the Senate Judiciary Committee on December 9, 2015 and her nomination generated no controversy. On January 28, 2016, her nomination was reported out of committee by voice vote. Her nomination expired on January 3, 2017, with the end of the 114th Congress.

=== Renomination to district court under Trump ===
On December 20, 2017, her renomination by President Donald Trump was announced and sent to the Senate as part of a bipartisan package of nominees which included Marilyn Horan and Chad Kenney. She was renominated to the same seat. On February 15, 2018, the Senate Judiciary Committee reported her nomination by voice vote. On August 28, 2018, her nomination was confirmed by voice vote. She received her judicial commission on September 10, 2018.

== Notable cases ==
- In Pennsylvania General Energy Company, LLC v. Grant Township in 2015, she found against Grant Township, Pennsylvania and in favor of Pennsylvania General Energy, LLC (PGE) in its claim that the Township's prohibition on injection wells violated the corporation's constitutional rights. The Township was represented by the Community Environmental Legal Defense Fund in the case, which was profiled in Rolling Stone magazine in May 2017.

== Personal life ==
She is married to Donald L. Baxter Jr. and has two children.

Legal offices
Preceded by Sean J. McLaughlin	Judge of the United States District Court for the Western District of Pennsylvania; 2018–present	Incumbent
