= Thomas Hardiman =

American judge (born 1965)

- Official portrait, 2015

Judge of the United States Court of Appeals for the Third Circuit
- Incumbent
- Assumed office April 2, 2007
- Appointed by: George W. Bush
- Preceded by: Richard Lowell Nygaard

Judge of the United States District Court for the Western District of Pennsylvania
- In office October 27, 2003 – April 5, 2007
- Appointed by: George W. Bush
- Preceded by: William Lloyd Standish
- Succeeded by: Cathy Bissoon

Personal details
- Born: Thomas Michael Hardiman; 1965 (age 60–61) Winchester, Massachusetts, U.S.
- Party: Republican
- Spouse: Lori Zappala
- Children: 3
- Education: University of Notre Dame (BA); Georgetown University (JD)

Thomas Michael Hardiman (born 1965) is a United States circuit judge of the United States Court of Appeals for the Third Circuit. Nominated by President George W. Bush, he began active service on April 2, 2007. He maintains chambers in Pittsburgh, Pennsylvania, and was previously a United States district judge.

In 2017, Hardiman was a finalist to succeed Antonin Scalia as an Associate Justice of the Supreme Court of the United States, alongside the eventual nominee, Neil Gorsuch. The next year, after Justice Anthony Kennedy had announced his retirement from the Supreme Court, Hardiman was once again considered to be a frontrunner to fill the vacant seat, though it was eventually filled by Brett Kavanaugh.

== Early life and education ==
Hardiman was born in 1965 in Winchester, Massachusetts, and was raised in Waltham. His father, Robert, owned and operated a taxicab and school transportation business and his mother, Judith (née' Kohler), was a homemaker and bookkeeper for the family business.

As a teenager, Hardiman began working part-time as a taxi driver, which he continued to do throughout high school and college. In 1983, he graduated from Waltham High School.

He was the first person in his family to graduate from college, receiving a Bachelor of Arts degree from the University of Notre Dame on an academic scholarship and graduating with honors in 1987. He then studied law at Georgetown University Law Center, where he served as an editor of the Georgetown Law Journal and made the semi-finals of the Robert J. Beaudry Moot Court Competition, while working at law firms during the summers and academic terms to help pay his tuition. He received a Juris Doctor with honors in 1990.

== Early career ==
After graduation, Hardiman joined the Washington, DC, office of the law firm Skadden, Arps, Slate, Meagher & Flom, where he was an associate in the litigation department from 1989 to 1992. From 1992 to 1999, he practiced with the Pittsburgh law firm of Titus & McConomy as an associate and then from 1996 to 1999 as a partner. From 1999 to 2003, he was a partner in the litigation department at law firm of Reed Smith, also in Pittsburgh. His practice consisted mainly of civil and white-collar criminal litigation.

== Federal judicial service ==
=== District court service ===
Hardiman was appointed by President George W. Bush to be a judge of the United States District Court for the Western District of Pennsylvania. He was nominated to a seat on April 9, 2003, and was confirmed by a voice vote on October 22, 2003. He received his commission on October 27, 2003, and took the bench on November 1, 2003. His service as a district court judge was terminated on April 5, 2007, when he was elevated to the court of appeals.

=== Court of appeals service ===
Hardiman was subsequently nominated to the Third Circuit by President Bush on January 9, 2007, to fill a seat vacated by Judge Richard Lowell Nygaard, who assumed senior status in 2005. Hardiman was confirmed by the Senate on March 15, 2007, by a 95–0 vote. He received his commission on April 2, 2007.

== Notable rulings ==
=== Police and prison powers ===
In Florence v. Board of Chosen Freeholders (2010), Hardiman held that a jail policy of strip-searching everyone who is arrested does not violate the prohibition of unreasonable searches and seizures in the Fourth Amendment. The Supreme Court affirmed the decision in 2012.

In Barkes v. First Correctional Medical, Inc. (2014), Hardiman dissented from a ruling that two Delaware prison officials could be sued for failing to provide adequate suicide prevention protocols after a mentally-ill inmate committed suicide. The Supreme Court agreed and unanimously reversed in Taylor v. Barkes.

=== Capital punishment ===
Hardiman has generally voted in favor of the state and against inmates when he decided on cases that centered on capital punishment. Most of the cases that he has encountered involved disputes surrounding the Antiterrorism and Effective Death Penalty Act, a 1996 US law limiting an inmates' ability to seek habeas corpus relief from their conviction. He often affirms his belief that the Act places a high standard on inmates that they usually cannot reach. However, he joined the majority in favor of State of Delaware in Jackson III vs Danberg that was written by D. Michael Fisher, which warned Delaware that the decision “should in no way be construed as license for Delaware to stay the worrisome course it appears to have taken at times under its former protocol" and that "[t]he record before us reflects an occasional blitheness on Delaware's part that, while perhaps not unconstitutional, gives us great pause. We remind Delaware not only of its constitutional obligation to ensure that the implementation of its new protocol does not run afoul of the Eighth Amendment's proscription of cruel and unusual punishment, but also of its moral obligation to carry out executions with the degree of seriousness and respect that the state-administered termination of human life demands."

=== Criminal sentencing ===
In two cases, Hardiman has ruled in favor of longer criminal sentences. In United States v. Abbott (2009), Hardiman held that a defendant's mandatory minimum sentence is not affected by the imposition of another mandatory minimum for a different offense. The panel held that the trial court judge had not erred in allowing the prosecutor to present evidence that the defendant had a prior conviction for a different charge, where such information is typically barred by Federal Rules of Evidence. It also upheld mandatory minimum sentences to be run consecutively, rather than concurrently, such that the defendant would serve 30 years rather than the mandatory minimum of 15 years. The Supreme Court affirmed the decision in 2010, in Abbott v. United States.

In United States v. Fisher (2007), Hardiman ruled that a judge could find facts to enhance a criminal sentence according to the preponderance of the evidence standard.

=== Religious freedom ===
In Busch v. Marple Newtown School District (2008), Hardiman wrote a dissenting opinion in favor of parents who described themselves as Evangelical Christians and were barred from reading from the Bible during a kindergarten "show and tell" presentation. Hardiman wrote that "the school went too far in this case in limiting participation in ‘All About Me’ week to nonreligious perspectives," which "plainly constituted" discrimination. Hardiman wrote that "the majority's desire to protect young children from potentially influential speech in the classroom is understandable," but that students cannot be barred from expressing "what is most important" about themselves. However, in August 2019, Hardiman wrote a majority opinion overturning a lower court decision that required the removal of a Christian cross from the Lehigh County Seal because its inclusion served no secular purpose and a reasonable person would see the use of a religious symbol as endorsement of a religion by the government. Hardiman, however, argued that the plaintiffs did not show evidence of a specific intent to discriminate or disrespect other religious viewpoints when the cross and no other religious symbols had been added to the seal in 1944: "more than seven decades after its adoption, the seal has become a familiar, embedded feature of Lehigh County, attaining a broader meaning than any one of its many symbols." The other symbols, including a grain silo, were not controversial. When Commissioner Harry Hertzog designed and proposed adoption of the seal in 1944, he said that the cross signified "the God-fearing people which are the foundation of our county."

In Groff v. Dejoy (2022), Hardiman wrote a dissenting opinion in favor of a postal worker who sued the U.S. Postal Service for failing to accommodate his religious observance of the Sabbath, as required by Title VII of the Civil Rights Act of 1964. Hardiman questioned a 1977 Supreme Court precedent interpreting Title VII not to require such accommodations when they would impose more than a "de minimis cost" on employers. The Supreme Court granted review and reversed in an opinion by Justice Samuel Alito, rejecting the "de minimis" standard and remanding the case to the Third Circuit.

=== Gun rights ===
In United States vs. Barton (2011), Hardiman rejected a challenge to the federal law that bans felons from owning firearms. However, in Binderup v. Attorney General (2016), he held that such a prohibition could cover only dangerous persons who are likely to use firearms for illicit purposes. He wrote that "the most cogent principle that can be drawn from traditional limitations on the right to keep and bear arms is that dangerous persons likely to use firearms for illicit purposes were not understood to be protected by the Second Amendment."

In the 2013 case Drake v. Filko, Hardiman filed a dissenting opinion that argued that the New Jersey requirement for gun owners to show a "justifiable need" to carry a handgun was unconstitutional. Hardiman cited District of Columbia v. Heller and wrote that based on the Heller ruling, the Second Amendment "protects an inherent right to self-defense."

In Range v. Attorney General (2023), Hardiman wrote the majority opinion for the en banc Third Circuit holding that the federal law barring firearm possession by felons was unconstitutional under the Second Amendment as applied to a man who had been convicted of making false statements to obtain food stamps.

=== Free speech ===
In United States v. Stevens (2008), Hardiman voted to strike down a federal law that criminalized videos depicting animal cruelty.

In Kelly v. Borough of Carlisle (2010), Hardiman ruled that a police officer had qualified immunity because there was no clearly-established First Amendment right to videotape police officers during traffic stops.

In B.H. ex rel. Hawk v. Easton Area School District (2013), Hardiman dissented from the court's holding that a public school violated the First Amendment by banning middle-school students from wearing bracelets inscribed "I [love] boobies!" sold by a breast cancer awareness group.

In Lodge No. 5 of Fraternal Order of Police v. City of Philadelphia (2014), Hardiman struck down a city charter provision barring police officers from donating to their union's political action committee, under the First Amendment to the United States Constitution.

In Northeastern Pennsylvania Freethought Society v. County of Lackawanna Transit System, Hardiman struck down the application of a county provision barring religious speech on public buses because the policy was viewpoint discriminatory against religious organizations.

=== Immigration ===
In Valdiviezo-Galdamez v. Attorney General (2010), Hardiman ruled in favor of a man from Honduras who was seeking asylum in the United States to avoid being recruited into a violent gang.

In Di Li Li v. Attorney General (2015), Hardiman decided that the Board of Immigration Appeals had to reopen a case when an asylum seeker from China converted to Christianity and argued that "conditions have worsened over time" for Christians in China.

In Cazun v. Attorney General (2017), Hardiman concurred in the judgment to explain that the Immigration and Nationality Act unambiguously forbids aliens subject to reinstated removal orders from applying for asylum and that the court should have held so without resorting to Chevron deference.

=== LGBT issues ===
In Brian D. Prowel v. Wise Business Forms, INC., Hardiman "wrote for the court in allowing a gender-stereotyping claim by a gay man who described himself as 'effeminate' to go forward, reversing the district court’s grant of summary judgment in favor of the company where the man worked, and which ultimately fired him." Hardiman determined that Prowel's case could move forward because Prowel may argue that he faced discrimination for not conforming to the company's vision of gender norms.

=== Commerce ===
In United States v. Pendleton (2011), Thomas Pendleton, a man who sexually molested a 15-year-old boy in Germany was convicted and sentenced in Delaware under the PROTECT Act of 2003. The defendant argued that the PROTECT Act was unconstitutional based on the Foreign Commerce Clause. Hardiman ruled that the PROTECT Act was valid because of an "express connection" to the channels of foreign commerce.

In 2018, Hardiman held for the en banc court in Rotkiske v. Klemm that despite the decisions of the Fourth and the Ninth Circuits, the statute of limitations under the Fair Debt Collection Practices Act begins to run when a violation of the Act occurs, not when the violation is later discovered.

== Affiliations and recognition ==
Before becoming a judge, Hardiman was a member of the bars of Pennsylvania, Massachusetts, and the District of Columbia. Since 2013, Hardiman has served as chair of the Committee on Information Technology of the Judicial Conference of the United States. As of January 2017, he was a member of the American Law Institute, a master of the Edward M. Sell University of Pittsburgh Chapter of the American Inns of Court, and a fellow in the Academy of Trial Lawyers of Allegheny County.

In 2010 Hardiman received the Georgetown University Law Center's Paul R. Dean Award recognizing distinguished alumni.

== Personal life ==
Hardiman married Lori Hardiman (née Zappala), an attorney and real estate professional, in 1992. The Zappala family, which includes Stephen Zappala and Stephen Zappala Sr., are prominent Democrats. Hardiman is the father of three children. Hardiman is Roman Catholic.

As a student, Hardiman participated in an exchange program in Mexico, and he later volunteered with the Ayuda immigration legal aid office in Washington, D.C., representing immigrants.

Hardiman is a board member and former president of Big Brothers Big Sisters of Greater Pittsburgh.

== See also ==
- Donald Trump Supreme Court candidates

Legal offices
Preceded by William Lloyd Standish	Judge of the United States District Court for the Western District of Pennsylvania; 2003–2007	Succeeded by Cathy Bissoon
Preceded by Richard Lowell Nygaard	Judge of the United States Court of Appeals for the Third Circuit; 2007–present	Incumbent
