= Richard Lowell Nygaard =

American judge (born 1940)

Richard Nygaard

Senior Judge of the United States Court of Appeals for the Third Circuit
- Incumbent
- Assumed office July 9, 2005

Judge of the United States Court of Appeals for the Third Circuit
- In office October 17, 1988 – July 9, 2005
- Appointed by: Ronald Reagan
- Preceded by: Joseph F. Weis Jr.
- Succeeded by: Thomas Hardiman

Personal details
- Born: Richard Lowell Nygaard; July 9, 1940 (age 86) Thief River Falls, Minnesota, U.S.
- Education: University of Southern California (BS); University of Michigan (JD)

Richard Lowell Nygaard (born July 9, 1940) is a Senior United States circuit judge of the United States Court of Appeals for the Third Circuit.

== Education and career ==
Richard Lowell Nygaard was born in Thief River Falls, Minnesota, on July 9, 1940. He received a Bachelor of Science degree cum laude from the University of Southern California in 1969 and a Juris Doctor from the University of Michigan Law School in 1971. He was a Petty Officer Second Class in the United States Naval Reserve from 1958 to 1964. He was in private practice in North East, Pennsylvania from 1972 to 1980. He was a judge on the Court of Common Pleas, Sixth District of Pennsylvania, Erie, Pennsylvania from 1981 to 1988.

== Federal judicial service ==
Nygaard was nominated by President Ronald Reagan on May 25, 1988, to a seat on the United States Court of Appeals for the Third Circuit vacated when Judge Joseph F. Weis Jr. assumed senior status. He was confirmed by the United States Senate on October 14, 1988, and received his commission on October 17, 1988. He assumed senior status on July 9, 2005. In 2017, Judge Nygaard partially dissented when the majority granted qualified immunity to police officers who prevented bystanders from recording video of them.

== Sources ==
Legal offices
Preceded by Joseph F. Weis Jr.	Judge of the United States Court of Appeals for the Third Circuit; 1988–2005	Succeeded by Thomas Hardiman
