= Charlton Beattie =

American judge

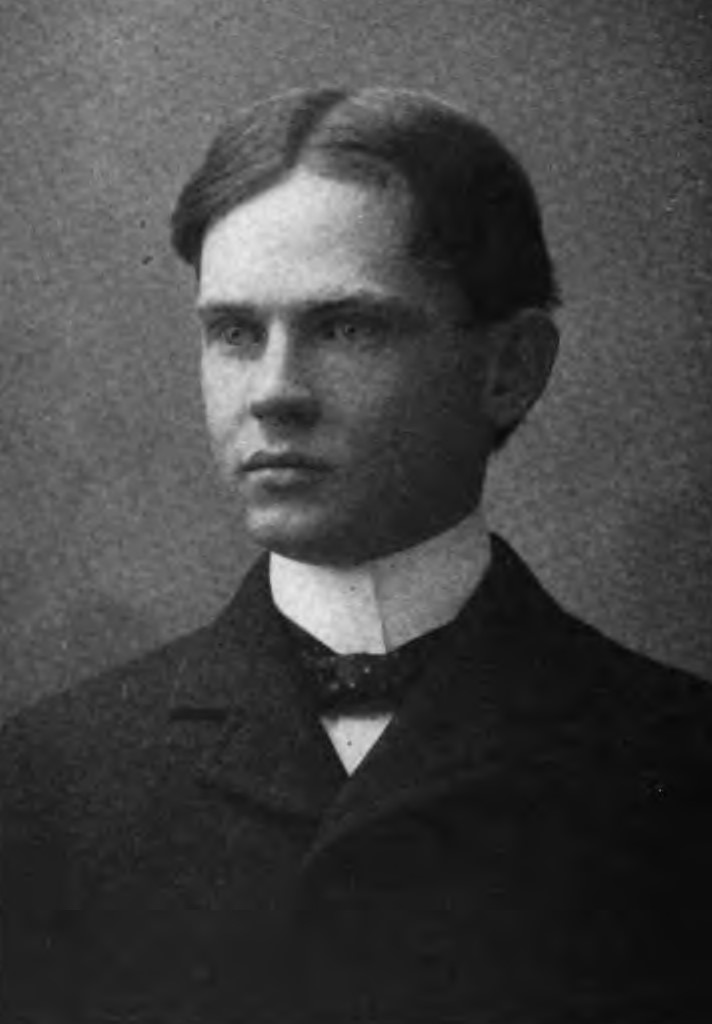

Judge of the United States District Court for the Eastern District of Louisiana
- In office January 21, 1925 – August 23, 1925
- Appointed by: Calvin Coolidge
- Preceded by: Rufus Edward Foster
- Succeeded by: Louis Henry Burns

Personal details
- Born: Charlton Reid Beattie; April 22, 1869 Assumption Parish, Louisiana
- Died: August 23, 1925 (aged 56) Thibodaux, Louisiana
- Education: University of Virginia; University of Virginia School of Law (LL.B.)

Charlton Reid Beattie (April 22, 1869 – August 23, 1925) was a United States district judge of the United States District Court for the Eastern District of Louisiana. He was the son of Confederate Army officer, judge, and Republican Party politician Taylor Beattie.

== Education and career ==
Born in Assumption Parish, Louisiana, Beattie was the son of Louisiana politician and judge Taylor Beattie. Like his father, Beattie graduated from the University of Virginia in 1889 and received a Bachelor of Laws from the University of Virginia School of Law in 1891. He was in private practice in Thibodaux, Louisiana from 1892 to 1913, and in New Orleans, Louisiana in 1913. He was also the United States Attorney for the Eastern District of Louisiana from 1909 to 1913. He served on the faculty at Tulane University Law School.

== Federal judicial service ==
On January 13, 1925, Beattie was nominated by President Calvin Coolidge to a seat on the United States District Court for the Eastern District of Louisiana vacated by Judge Rufus Edward Foster. Beattie was confirmed by the United States Senate on January 19, 1925, and received his commission on January 21, 1925. Beattie served in that capacity until his death on August 23, 1925, in Thibodaux.

== Sources ==
Legal offices
Preceded by Rufus Edward Foster	Judge of the United States District Court for the Eastern District of Louisiana; 1925	Succeeded by Louis Henry Burns
