= Joseph Putnam Willson =

American judge (1902–1998)

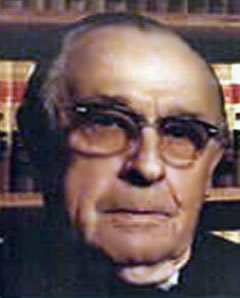

Senior Judge of the United States District Court for the Western District of Pennsylvania
- In office October 18, 1968 – August 3, 1998

Judge of the United States District Court for the Western District of Pennsylvania
- In office July 14, 1953 – October 18, 1968
- Appointed by: Dwight D. Eisenhower
- Preceded by: Owen McIntosh Burns
- Succeeded by: Joseph F. Weis Jr.

Personal details
- Born: Joseph Putnam Willson; January 7, 1902 Bath, New York
- Died: August 3, 1998 (aged 96) Smethport, Pennsylvania
- Education: University of Pennsylvania (B.S.); Temple University Beasley School of Law (LL.B.)

Joseph Putnam Willson (January 7, 1902 – August 3, 1998) was a United States district judge of the United States District Court for the Western District of Pennsylvania.

== Education and career ==
Born in Bath, New York, Willson received a Bachelor of Science degree from the University of Pennsylvania in 1926 and a Bachelor of Laws from the Temple University Beasley School of Law in 1931. At received a football scholarship at Penn and played as a tackle for the Penn Quakers. He was elected captain of the 1925 Penn Quakers football team.

Willson was in private practice in Smethport, Pennsylvania from 1931 to 1953. He served in the United States Naval Reserve during World War II, from 1942 to 1945. He was a member of the Pennsylvania Game Commission from 1948 to 1953, and was a Special Master for the Supreme Court of the United States from 1964 to 1972.

== Federal judicial service ==
On June 8, 1953, Willson was nominated by President Dwight D. Eisenhower to a seat on the United States District Court for the Western District of Pennsylvania vacated by Judge Owen McIntosh Burns. Willson was confirmed by the United States Senate on July 14, 1953, and received his commission the same day. He assumed senior status on October 18, 1968, serving in that capacity until his death on August 3, 1998, in Smethport.

== See also ==
- List of United States federal judges by longevity of service

Legal offices
| Preceded by Owen McIntosh Burns | Judge of the United States District Court for the Western District of Pennsylvania; 1953–1968 | Succeeded by Joseph F. Weis Jr. |
