= Mark R. Hornak =

American judge (born 1956)

Mark Hornak
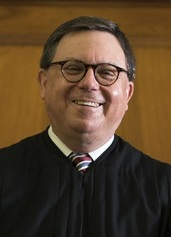

Chief Judge of the United States District Court for the Western District of Pennsylvania
- In office December 7, 2018 – December 7, 2025
- Preceded by: Joy Flowers Conti
- Succeeded by: Cathy Bissoon

Judge of the United States District Court for the Western District of Pennsylvania
- Incumbent
- Assumed office October 19, 2011
- Appointed by: Barack Obama
- Preceded by: Donetta Ambrose

Personal details
- Born: Mark Raymond Hornak; March 31, 1956 (age 70) Homestead, Pennsylvania, U.S.
- Education: University of Pittsburgh (BA, JD)

Mark Raymond Hornak (born March 31, 1956) is a United States district judge of the United States District Court for the Western District of Pennsylvania.

== Early life and education ==
Born on March 31, 1956, in Homestead, Pennsylvania, Hornak earned a Bachelor of Arts degree in 1978 from the University of Pittsburgh and a Juris Doctor in 1981 from the University of Pittsburgh School of Law.

== Career ==
From 1981 until 1982, he served as a law clerk to Judge James Marshall Sprouse of the United States Court of Appeals for the Fourth Circuit, in Charleston, West Virginia. From 1982 until 1988, Hornak served as an associate at the Pittsburgh law firm Buchanan, Ingersoll & Rooney. From 1988 until his federal judicial confirmation, he was a partner with the firm, specializing in civil litigation, labor and employment law, media defense, and governmental representation. For 15 years, he also was solicitor of the Sports & Exhibition Authority of Pittsburgh and Allegheny County. From 1989 to 1993, he was an adjunct professor at the University of Pittsburgh School of Law.

=== Federal judicial service ===
On December 1, 2010, President Obama nominated Hornak to fill a judicial vacancy on the United States District Court for the Western District of Pennsylvania that had been created by the transition to senior status in November 2010 by Judge Donetta Ambrose. The United States Senate confirmed Hornak in a voice vote on October 19, 2011. He received his commission that same day. He became chief judge on December 7, 2018.

== Personal ==
Hornak has been married since 1981. He has five children.

Legal offices
Preceded by Donetta Ambrose	Judge of the United States District Court for the Western District of Pennsylvania; 2011–present	Incumbent
Preceded by Joy Flowers Conti	Chief Judge of the United States District Court for the Western District of Pennsylvania; 2018–2025	Succeeded by Cathy Bissoon
