= Stuart Slotnick =

American attorney

- Born: June 8, 1969 (age 57); New York City, New York, U.S.
- Education: Brandeis University; New York University
- Occupation: Attorney
- Organization: Buchanan Ingersoll & Rooney
- Title: Partner
- Spouse: Amy Albert
- Father: Barry Slotnick

Stuart Slotnick (born June 8, 1969) is a New York City trial attorney and a partner at national law firm, Buchanan Ingersoll & Rooney. His practice includes commercial and business litigation, white-collar defense, government investigations, and other civil litigation matters. Slotnick's clients include casino magnate, Steve Wynn, first lady, Melania Trump and Godfather actor, Gianni Russo.

He currently serves as chair of the New York City Bar Association Judiciary Committee. The committee is responsible for evaluating candidates for election, appointment, reelection, and reappointment, to justice administration offices in New York State courts.

== Career ==
Slotnick graduated from Brandeis University, cum laude, and attended New York University School of Law. He began his career in government service, working in the Kings County District Attorney's Office, where he served as a senior trial attorney and supervising senior assistant district attorney. He prosecuted a broad range of criminal cases, including homicide cases and conducted hundreds of grand-jury investigations.

He currently serves as the managing shareholder of Buchanan's New York office. Prior to joining Buchanan, he served as a special counsel at a New York litigation boutique.

Slotnick is known for defending several soldiers against the Army's stop-loss policy. In 2004, he successfully defended Jay Ferriola, a retired Army Captain who was ordered to redeploy to Iraq after completing eight years of service, under the grounds that the Army violated his due process rights. The case was the first to challenge the Army's stop-loss policy, which had affected tens of thousands of soldiers since the start of the Iraq War. Slotnick went on to successfully try four more similar cases.

Slotnick also serves as corporate counsel to billionaire casino magnate, Steve Wynn, in litigation matters that have resulted in successful dismissal of claims and positive settlements. He has also served as a long-time lawyer for American Apparel. In December 2006, he helped them navigate a $250 million acquisition deal with Endeavour Acquisition Corp. He later represented American Apparel when they were sued by Woody Allen for using Allen's image without permission. The suit was settled before trial by American Apparel paying Allen $5 million.

Slotnick represented Donald Schupak of Renaissance Art Investors in their case against Salander-O'Reilly art galleries. Slotnick went on to secure hundreds of works from Salander for Renaissance Art Galleries. He represented Weitz Communications in a suit against Capital Play over an allegedly unpaid consulting fee. He won a $2 million suit for a woman who had permanent liver damage from the diabetes drug Rezulin. Slotnick worked for Harvard Law Professor Alan Dershowitz and was acknowledged for his work in the New York Times bestselling book Chutzpah.

Most recently, Slotnick attained a settlement for Sportingbet in a case against the United States Attorney of the Southern District of New York. Sportingbet, a publicly traded company on the London Stock Exchange (LON: SBT), entered into a non-prosecution agreement and forfeiture of $33 million. The settlement was viewed as a positive one for Sportingbet, as a competitor, Partygaming PLC, settled similar charges in 2009 for $105 million.

== Professional Recognition ==
Slotnick has been recognized by Super Lawyers, having been selected to its New York Metro list from 2013 through 2026. He has also received an AV Preeminent peer-review rating from Martindale-Hubbell.

== Personal life ==
In 2006, Slotnick married Amy Albert, a counsel to New York law firm Weiss & Hiller. His father is prominent defense attorney, Barry Slotnick, well known for defending Bernard Goetz, John Gotti, Joe Colombo, and Manuel Noriega. He was the subject of James Patterson's 2021 best seller, "The Defense Lawyer".
