= Donetta Ambrose =

American judge (born 1945)

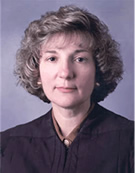

Senior Judge of the United States District Court for the Western District of Pennsylvania
- Incumbent
- Assumed office November 5, 2010

Chief Judge of the United States District Court for the Western District of Pennsylvania
- In office 2002–2009
- Preceded by: D. Brooks Smith
- Succeeded by: Gary L. Lancaster

Judge of the United States District Court for the Western District of Pennsylvania
- In office November 24, 1993 – November 5, 2010
- Appointed by: Bill Clinton
- Preceded by: Gerald Joseph Weber
- Succeeded by: Mark R. Hornak

Personal details
- Born: Donetta Wypiski; November 5, 1945 (age 80) New Kensington, Pennsylvania, U.S.
- Education: Duquesne University (BA, JD)

Donetta Wypiski Ambrose (born November 5, 1945) is a senior United States district judge of the United States District Court for the Western District of Pennsylvania.

== Early life and education ==
Ambrose was born in New Kensington, Pennsylvania. Her father, Chester Wypiski, worked at the Alcoa mill.

She received a Bachelor of Arts degree from Duquesne University in 1967 and a Juris Doctor from Duquesne University School of Law in 1970.

== Career as lawyer and state judge ==
She was a law clerk to Louis Manderino of Commonwealth Court of Pennsylvania from 1970 to 1971. She was an assistant attorney general of Pennsylvania Department of Justice from 1972 to 1974, thereafter entering private practice in New Kensington until 1981. For a time in the mid-1970s, Ambrose was the only woman practicing law in Westmoreland County.

She was an assistant district attorney in the Westmoreland County District Attorney's Office from 1977 to 1981, a part-time role. As a prosecutor, she was part of the team handling the "Kill for Thrill" case against John Lesko and Michael Travaglia, who were convicted of slaying four people in Western Pennsylvania in 1979 and 1980.

She was a judge of the Westmoreland County Court of Common Pleas from 1982 to 1993. As a state judge, she worked on hundreds of asbestos cases, fashioning a formula that helped settle most of the county's asbestos litigation. She left the state court to accept an appointment to the federal bench.

== Federal judicial service ==
On October 25, 1993, Ambrose was nominated by President Bill Clinton to a seat on the U.S. District Court for the Western District of Pennsylvania vacated by Gerald Joseph Weber. She was confirmed by the United States Senate on November 20, 1993, and received her commission on November 24, 1993. Upon the elevation of D. Brooks Smith to the Third Circuit Court of Appeals, Judge Ambrose became Chief Judge for the U.S. District Court for the Western District of Pennsylvania, and served in that capacity until 2009.

While on the federal bench, Ambrose presided over the civil trial against Atlantic Richfield and Babcock & Wilcox, and others, alleging that radioactive emissions from its nuclear-fuel facility in Apollo caused a cancer cluster in the surrounding area. The case was one of the longest-running cases in the history of the U.S. District Court of Western Pennsylvania, running for 14 years and ultimately settling for $52.5 million.

In 2022, Ambrose presided over pretrial hearings in the federal death penalty case against Robert Bowers, who was indicted on charges of murdering 11 congregants in a gun massacre at a Pittsburgh synagogue.

Ambrose assumed senior status (semi-retirement) on November 5, 2010. Ambrose retired (assumed inactive senior status) on February 1, 2022, after 28 years on the federal bench. The Bowers case was randomly reassigned to a different judge upon her retirement.

== Personal life ==
In her early years on the federal bench, Ambrose lived in Lower Burrell; Ambrose later moved to Oakmont.

Legal offices
Preceded by Gerald Joseph Weber	Judge of the United States District Court for the Western District of Pennsylvania; 1993–2010	Succeeded by Mark R. Hornak
Preceded by D. Brooks Smith	Chief Judge of the United States District Court for the Western District of Pennsylvania; 2002–2009	Succeeded by Gary L. Lancaster
