= Barron Patterson McCune =

American judge (1915–2008)

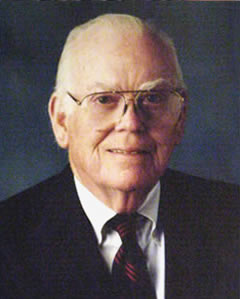

Senior Judge of the United States District Court for the Western District of Pennsylvania
- In office April 1, 1985 – September 10, 2008

Judge of the United States District Court for the Western District of Pennsylvania
- In office December 18, 1970 – April 1, 1985
- Appointed by: Richard Nixon
- Preceded by: Seat established by 84 Stat. 294
- Succeeded by: William Lloyd Standish

Personal details
- Born: Barron Patterson McCune; February 19, 1915 West Newton, Pennsylvania
- Died: September 10, 2008 (aged 93) Washington, Pennsylvania
- Party: Republican
- Education: Washington & Jefferson College (A.B.); University of Pennsylvania Law School (LL.B.)

Barron Patterson McCune (February 19, 1915 – September 10, 2008) was a United States district judge of the United States District Court for the Western District of Pennsylvania.

== Education and career ==
McCune was born in West Newton, Pennsylvania, in 1915 and attended Washington & Jefferson College in Washington, Pennsylvania. As a student, he submitted jokes told by history professor Dr. Alfred Sweet to Judge magazine, splitting the $2 check from the publication. He was a member of Lambda Chi Alpha fraternity, as well as the Buskin Club, a theater organization. McCune received an Artium Baccalaureus degree from Washington & Jefferson College in 1935. As McCune then took a job with Firestone Tire and Rubber Company in Akron, Ohio, his father encouraged him to study law. He entered University of Pennsylvania Law School and earned a Bachelor of Laws in 1938. After graduation, he rejected a job offer in Philadelphia, but he felt that the $1,800 salary wasn't enough to live on. He returned to Washington in 1939 to work in his own private practice, serving in the United States Naval Reserve as a gunnery officer from 1942 to 1948. In 1964, he became a judge of the Court of Common Pleas in Washington County, Pennsylvania.

== Federal judicial service ==
On December 8, 1970, President Richard Nixon nominated McCune to serve as a United States District Judge for the Western District of Pennsylvania. His appointment was to a newly established seat authorized by 84 Stat. 294. The United States Senate confirmed his nomination on December 16, 1970, and he received his commission on December 18, 1970.

He assumed senior status on April 1, 1985, and later transitioned to inactive senior status in 1995. His judicial service concluded on September 10, 2008, upon his death.

== Notable cases ==
During McCune's tenure on the court, he heard a wide variety of cases, including a case involving cocaine trafficking in Major League Baseball and an insurance law case determining whether certain women with breast cancer had insurance coverage for bone marrow transplants. He held in favor of Allegheny County in a challenge by the American Civil Liberties Union to a display of the Nativity scene at the Allegheny County Courthouse. (Note: The United States Supreme Court overruled him in the case of County of Allegheny v. ACLU.)

== Other service ==
McCune was active with his alma mater, Washington & Jefferson College, serving on the board of trustees for 40 years, including a time as president of the board from 1976 to 1983. He was an avid fan of the Washington & Jefferson football team, attending every home game until the age of 92.

== Personal ==
McCune was married to his wife, Edna Markey, from 1943 until her death in 1999. They had three sons. He was a member of the Church of the Covenant. He was known for being a large man, standing 6 feet 4 inches and weighing 215 pounds, and his judicial demeanor was marked by his "one-liners, an imposing demeanor, and a penchant for cigars." He died on September 10, 2008, in Washington, Pennsylvania.

He always reminded me of a country philosopher sitting on the front porch of a general store. He had such a quirky view on things.

— Senior U.S. District Judge Maurice Cohill,

== Sources ==
Legal offices
Preceded by Seat established by 84 Stat. 294	Judge of the United States District Court for the Western District of Pennsylvania; 1970–1985	Succeeded by William Lloyd Standish
