= William Lloyd Standish =

American judge (1930–2015)

William Lloyd Standish IV
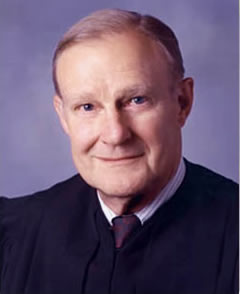

Senior Judge of the United States District Court for the Western District of Pennsylvania
- In office March 1, 2002 – January 1, 2015

Judge of the United States District Court for the Western District of Pennsylvania
- In office November 6, 1987 – March 1, 2002
- Appointed by: Ronald Reagan
- Preceded by: Barron Patterson McCune
- Succeeded by: Thomas Hardiman

Personal details
- Born: William Lloyd Standish IV; February 16, 1930 Pittsburgh, Pennsylvania
- Died: January 1, 2015 (aged 84) Sewickley, Pennsylvania
- Education: Yale University (B.A.); University of Virginia School of Law (LL.B.)

William Lloyd Standish IV (February 16, 1930 – January 1, 2015) was a United States district judge of the United States District Court for the Western District of Pennsylvania.

== Education and career ==
Standish was born in Pittsburgh, Pennsylvania in 1930. He received a Bachelor of Arts degree from Yale University in 1953. He received a Bachelor of Laws from the University of Virginia School of Law in 1956. He was in private practice in Pittsburgh from 1956 to 1980. He was a judge of the Court of Common Pleas in the Fifth Judicial District of Pennsylvania from 1980 to 1987.

== Federal judicial service ==
Standish was nominated by President Ronald Reagan on July 1, 1987, to a seat on the United States District Court for the Western District of Pennsylvania vacated by Judge Barron Patterson McCune. He was confirmed by the United States Senate on November 5, 1987, and received his commission on November 6, 1987. He assumed senior status on March 1, 2002, and stopped hearing cases in 2012, but remained in inactive senior status until his death.

== Death ==
Standish died on January 1, 2015, in Sewickley, Pennsylvania, following a lengthy undisclosed illness. He was 84.

== Sources ==
Legal offices
Preceded by Barron Patterson McCune	Judge of the United States District Court for the Western District of Pennsylvania; 1987–2002	Succeeded by Thomas Hardiman
