= Sean J. McLaughlin =

American judge (born 1955)

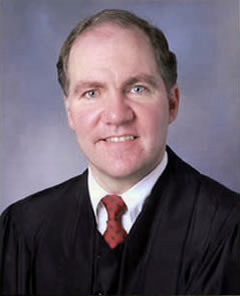

Chief Judge of the United States District Court for the Western District of Pennsylvania
- In office April 25, 2013 – August 16, 2013
- Preceded by: Gary L. Lancaster
- Succeeded by: Joy Flowers Conti

Judge of the United States District Court for the Western District of Pennsylvania
- In office October 13, 1994 – August 16, 2013
- Appointed by: Bill Clinton
- Preceded by: Glenn E. Mencer
- Succeeded by: Susan Paradise Baxter

Personal details
- Born: January 4, 1955 (age 71) Erie, Pennsylvania, U.S.
- Education: Georgetown University (AB); Georgetown University Law Center (JD)

Sean Joseph McLaughlin (born January 4, 1955) is a former United States district judge of the United States District Court for the Western District of Pennsylvania.

== Education and career ==
Born in Erie, Pennsylvania, McLaughlin received an Artium Baccalaureus degree from Georgetown University in 1977, followed by a Juris Doctor from the Georgetown University Law Center in 1980. He served as a law clerk for three different judges on the United States District Court for the Western District of Pennsylvania—William W. Knox, in 1980; Gerald Joseph Weber, from 1980 to 1981; and Maurice Blanchard Cohill, in 1981. McLaughlin then entered private practice at the law firm Knox McLaughlin Gornall & Sennett, P.C. until 1994.

== Federal judicial service ==
McLaughlin was nominated by President Bill Clinton on August 12, 1994, to a seat on the same court where he had clerked, which had been vacated by Glenn E. Mencer. McLaughlin was confirmed by the United States Senate on October 7, 1994, received his commission on October 11, 1994 and sworn in on October 13, 1994. Among the more notable cases presided over by McLaughlin was the criminal conviction of the conspirators in the murder of Brian Douglas Wells, a highly publicized case involving a bizarre and complex bank robbery scheme. He became Chief Judge on April 25, 2013, upon the sudden death of former Chief Judge Gary L. Lancaster. McLaughlin resigned in 2013 after being hired as General Counsel and Vice President of the Erie Insurance Group, with his final day on the bench being August 16, 2013. In January 2019, he returned to a different position at Knox McLaughlin Gornall & Sennett.

== Sources ==
Legal offices
Preceded by Glenn E. Mencer	Judge of the United States District Court for the Western District of Pennsylvania; 1994–2013	Succeeded by Susan Paradise Baxter
Preceded by Gary L. Lancaster	Chief Judge of the United States District Court for the Western District of Pennsylvania; 2013	Succeeded by Joy Flowers Conti
