= William S. Stickman IV =

American judge (born 1979)

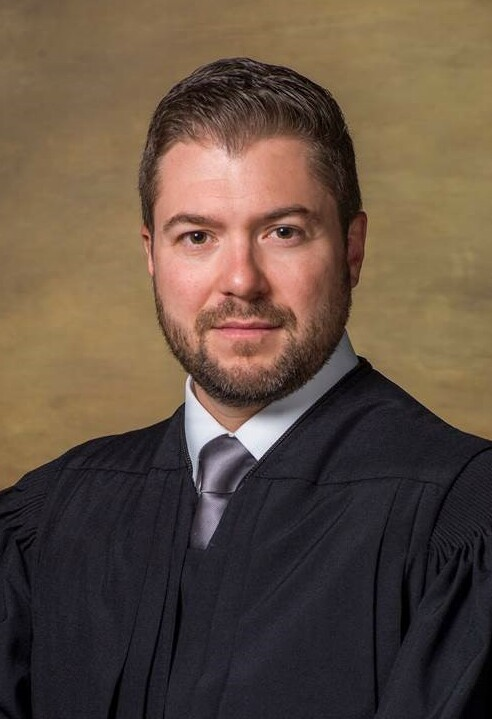

Judge of the United States District Court for the Western District of Pennsylvania
- Incumbent
- Assumed office August 5, 2019
- Appointed by: Donald Trump
- Preceded by: Joy Flowers Conti

Personal details
- Born: William Shaw Stickman IV; 1979 (age 46–47) Pittsburgh, Pennsylvania, U.S.
- Education: Duquesne University (BA, JD)

William Shaw Stickman IV (born 1979) is a United States district judge of the United States District Court for the Western District of Pennsylvania.

== Education ==
Stickman earned his Bachelor of Arts, summa cum laude, in 2002 and his Juris Doctor in 2005 from Duquesne University in Pittsburgh, Pennsylvania. He was a member of the Duquesne Law Review during law school.

== Legal career ==
From 2006 to 2007, Stickman served as a law clerk to Chief Justice Ralph Cappy of the Pennsylvania Supreme Court. He was then hired as an associate with Del Sole Cavanaugh Stroyd LLC in 2007 and became a partner in 2013, where his practice focused on commercial litigation, appellate matters, and personal injury law. From 2011 to 2017, he served on the Pennsylvania Civil Procedural Rules Committee.

== Federal judicial service ==
On May 3, 2019, President Donald Trump announced his intent to nominate Stickman to serve as a United States district judge for the United States District Court for the Western District of Pennsylvania. On May 13, 2019, President Trump nominated Stickman to the seat vacated by Judge Joy Flowers Conti, who assumed senior status on December 6, 2018. On June 5, 2019, a hearing on his nomination was held before the Senate Judiciary Committee. On June 27, 2019, his nomination was reported out of committee by a 12–10 vote. On July 30, 2019, the United States Senate invoked cloture on his nomination by a 57–31 vote. On July 31, 2019, his nomination was confirmed by a 56–34 vote. He received his judicial commission on August 5, 2019.

=== Notable ruling ===
- On September 14, 2020, Stickman ruled that the stay at home order issued by Pennsylvania Governor Tom Wolf amidst the coronavirus pandemic was unconstitutional, violating the right to freedom of assembly guaranteed by the First Amendment. The Wolf administration filed an appeal for a stay of the ruling. On October 1, 2020, Stickman's ruling was stayed by the United States Court of Appeals for the Third Circuit, pending appeal.

Legal offices
Preceded by Joy Flowers Conti	Judge of the United States District Court for the Western District of Pennsylvania; 2019–present	Incumbent
