= Glenn E. Mencer =

American judge

Glenn Everell Mencer
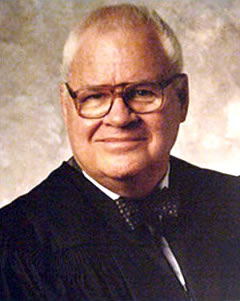

Senior Judge of the United States District Court for the Western District of Pennsylvania
- In office April 18, 1994 – April 17, 2007

Judge of the United States District Court for the Western District of Pennsylvania
- In office March 19, 1982 – April 18, 1994
- Appointed by: Ronald Reagan
- Preceded by: Daniel John Snyder Jr.
- Succeeded by: Sean J. McLaughlin

Personal details
- Born: Glenn Everell Mencer; May 18, 1925 Smethport, Pennsylvania
- Died: April 17, 2007 (aged 81) Bradford, Pennsylvania
- Education: University of Michigan (B.B.A.); University of Michigan Law School (J.D.)

Glenn Everell Mencer (May 18, 1925 – April 17, 2007) was a United States district judge of the United States District Court for the Western District of Pennsylvania.

== Education and career ==
Mencer was born in Smethport, Pennsylvania. He received his Bachelor of Business Administration from University of Michigan's Ross School of Business in 1949 and his Juris Doctor from University of Michigan Law School in 1952. He served in the United States Army from 1943 to 1945. He was in private practice of law in Eldred, Pennsylvania from 1953 to 1964. He served as district attorney of McKean County, Pennsylvania from 1956 to 1964. He was the presiding judge of the McKean County Court of Common Pleas, 48th Judicial District of Pennsylvania from 1964 to 1970. He was a judge of the Commonwealth Court of Pennsylvania in Harrisburg from 1970 to 1982.

== Federal judicial service ==
Mencer was nominated by President Ronald Reagan on February 19, 1982, to a seat on the United States District Court for the Western District of Pennsylvania vacated by Judge Daniel John Snyder Jr. He was confirmed by the United States Senate on March 18, 1982, and received his commission the next day. He assumed senior status on April 18, 1994. His service on the bench was terminated on April 17, 2007, due to death.

== Death ==
Mencer died on April 17, 2007, aged 81, at Bradford Regional Medical Center, McKean County, Pennsylvania, days after suffering a stroke.

== Sources ==
Legal offices
Preceded by Daniel John Snyder Jr.	Judge of the United States District Court for the Western District of Pennsylvania; 1982–1994	Succeeded by Sean J. McLaughlin
