= Louis Henry Burns =

American judge (1878–1928)

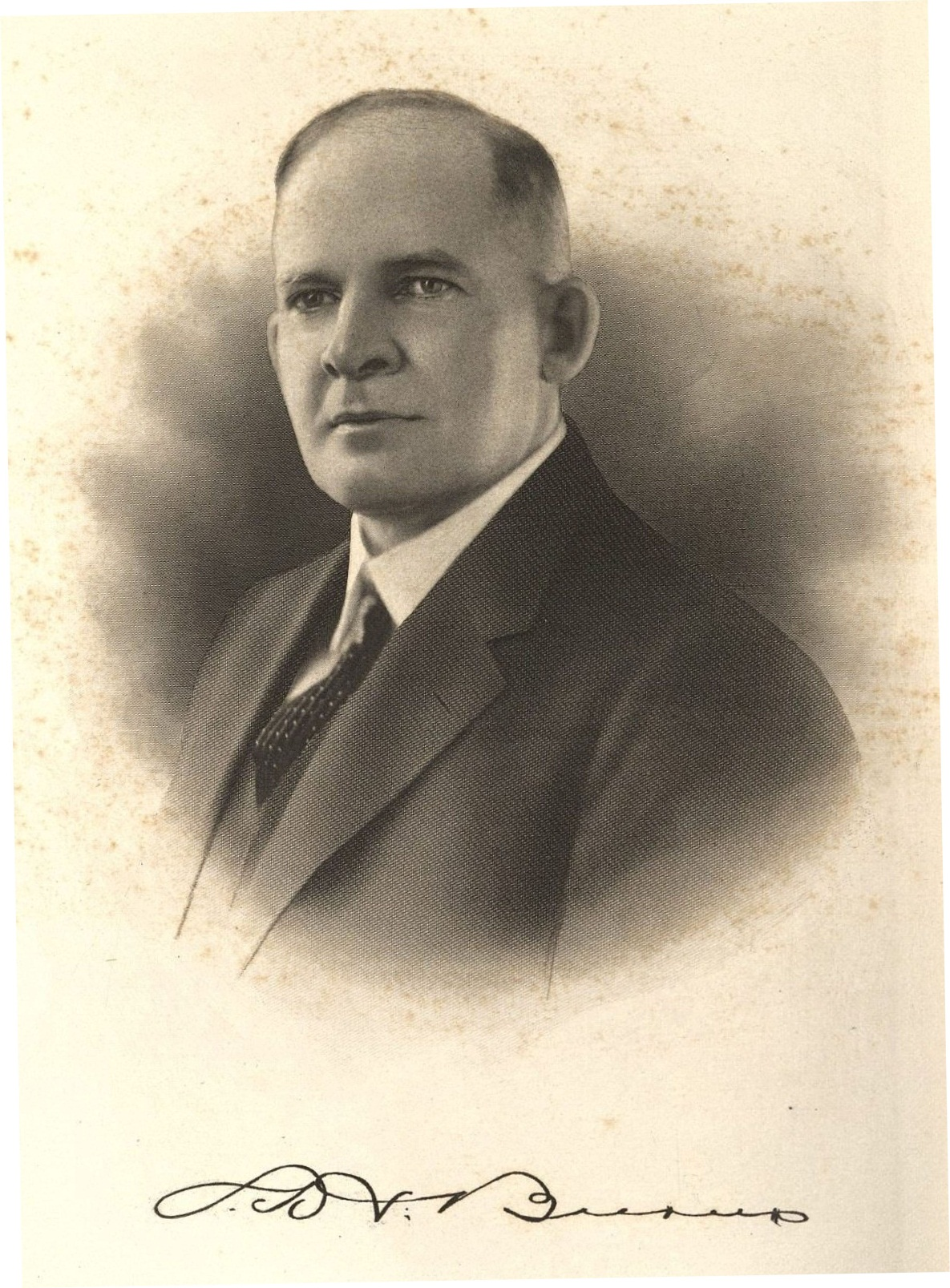

Judge of the United States District Court for the Eastern District of Louisiana
- In office October 3, 1925 – June 9, 1928
- Appointed by: Calvin Coolidge
- Preceded by: Charlton Beattie
- Succeeded by: Wayne G. Borah

Personal details
- Born: Louis Henry Burns; May 11, 1878 New Orleans, Louisiana
- Died: June 9, 1928 (aged 50) New Orleans, Louisiana
- Spouse: Julia W. Schillinger (m. 1900)
- Education: Tulane University Law School (LL.B.)

Louis Henry Burns (May 11, 1878 – June 9, 1928) was a United States district judge of the United States District Court for the Eastern District of Louisiana.

== Early life ==
Burns was born on May 11, 1878, in New Orleans, Louisiana, to Emily Nebraska (née Brockett) and Louis Burns. His father worked as a cooper. Burns grew up in New Orleans with nine younger siblings.

Burns married Julia W. Schillinger on November 29, 1900, in New Orleans. They were 22 and 24 years old, respectively.

== Education and career ==
Burns received a Bachelor of Laws from Tulane University Law School in 1904. He was in private practice in New Orleans from 1904 to 1911, and again from 1913 to 1921, serving as an Assistant United States Attorney of the Eastern District of Louisiana from 1911 to 1913, and later as the United States Attorney for that district from 1921 to 1925.

== Federal judicial service ==
Burns received a recess appointment from President Calvin Coolidge on October 3, 1925, to a seat on the United States District Court for the Eastern District of Louisiana vacated by Judge Charlton Beattie. He was nominated to the same position by President Coolidge on December 8, 1925. He was confirmed by the United States Senate on December 21, 1925, and received his commission the same day. His service terminated on June 9, 1928, due to his death.

He died in New Orleans on June 9, 1928.

== Sources ==
Legal offices
| Preceded by Charlton Beattie | Judge of the United States District Court for the Eastern District of Louisiana; 1925–1928 | Succeeded by Wayne G. Borah |
