= Daniel John Snyder Jr. =

American judge

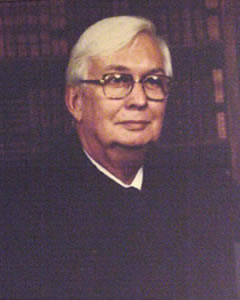

Judge of the United States District Court for the Western District of Pennsylvania
- In office April 17, 1973 – May 11, 1980
- Appointed by: Richard Nixon
- Preceded by: Joseph F. Weis Jr.
- Succeeded by: Glenn E. Mencer

Personal details
- Born: May 2, 1916 Greensburg, Pennsylvania
- Died: May 11, 1980 (aged 64)
- Education: College of Wooster (A.B.); University of Pittsburgh School of Law (LL.B.)

Daniel John Snyder Jr. (May 2, 1916 – May 11, 1980) was a United States district judge of the United States District Court for the Western District of Pennsylvania.

== Education and career ==
Born in Greensburg, Pennsylvania, Snyder received an Artium Baccalaureus degree from College of Wooster in 1937 and a Bachelor of Laws from the University of Pittsburgh School of Law in 1940. He was an associate professor at the University of Pittsburgh from 1940 to 1941. He enlisted in the United States Army October 27, 1942, and served as a Warrant Officer until December 1945. He was in private practice in Greensburg from 1946 to 1958. He was an Assistant United States Attorney of the Western District of Pennsylvania from 1958 to 1961. He was in private practice in Greensburg from 1961 to 1973.

== Federal judicial service ==
Snyder was nominated by President Richard Nixon on March 6, 1973, to a seat on the United States District Court for the Western District of Pennsylvania vacated by Judge Joseph F. Weis Jr. He was confirmed by the United States Senate on April 10, 1973, and received his commission on April 17, 1973. Snyder served in that capacity until his death on May 11, 1980.

== Sources ==
Legal offices
Preceded by Joseph F. Weis Jr.	Judge of the United States District Court for the Western District of Pennsylvania; 1973–1980	Succeeded by Glenn E. Mencer
