= Gary L. Lancaster =

American judge (1949–2013)

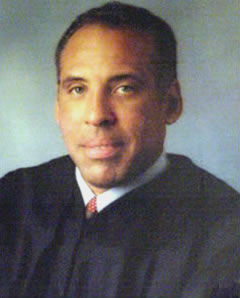

Chief Judge of the United States District Court for the Western District of Pennsylvania
- In office 2009–2013
- Preceded by: Donetta Ambrose
- Succeeded by: Sean J. McLaughlin

Judge of the United States District Court for the Western District of Pennsylvania
- In office November 24, 1993 – April 24, 2013
- Appointed by: Bill Clinton
- Preceded by: Timothy K. Lewis
- Succeeded by: Marilyn Horan

Magistrate Judge of the United States District Court for the Western District of Pennsylvania
- In office 1987–1993

Personal details
- Born: August 14, 1949 Brownsville, Pennsylvania
- Died: April 24, 2013 (aged 63) Pittsburgh, Pennsylvania
- Education: Slippery Rock State College (BS); University of Pittsburgh School of Law (JD)

Gary Lee Lancaster (August 14, 1949 – April 24, 2013) was a United States district judge of the United States District Court for the Western District of Pennsylvania.

== Early years ==
Born in Brownsville, Pennsylvania, Lancaster received a Bachelor of Science degree in secondary education from Slippery Rock State College in 1971 and a Juris Doctor from the University of Pittsburgh School of Law in 1974.

== Early career ==
From 1974 to 1978, Lancaster served as Regional Counsel to the Pennsylvania Human Relations Commission as well as an Assistant District Attorney in Allegheny County. He entered private practice in Pittsburgh, Pennsylvania in 1978, where he focused mostly on criminal litigation.

== Federal judicial service ==
=== United States magistrate judge service ===
In 1987, Lancaster was selected to serve as a United States magistrate judge for the United States District Court for the Western District of Pennsylvania.

=== United States district court service ===
He was nominated to be a district judge by President Bill Clinton on October 25, 1993, to the seat vacated by Timothy K. Lewis, who had been elevated to a newly created seat on the United States Court of Appeals for the Third Circuit. Lancaster was confirmed by the United States Senate on November 20, 1993, and received his commission the following day.

While on the bench, Lancaster served on the committee responsible for drafting the Third Circuit's Model Civil Jury Instructions, and was also appointed by Chief Justice William H. Rehnquist to serve on the Judicial Conference of the United States Committee on Judicial Resources. He was also responsible for overseeing the renovation of the district's historic New Deal-era federal courthouse in downtown Pittsburgh.

In 2009, Lancaster became the first African-American to serve as Chief Judge of the United States District Court for the Western District of Pennsylvania, succeeding Donetta Ambrose. During his tenure as Chief Judge, Lancaster was instrumental in the court's involvement in the Patent Pilot Program, a national initiative designed to enhance the expertise of federal judges in patent litigation. As of 2013, the United States District Court for the Western District of Pennsylvania remains one of the few judicial districts in the country to have Local Patent Rules.

== Death ==
Lancaster died suddenly on April 24, 2013, at his home in Pittsburgh. He was still on the bench and was expected to serve on active status through at least 2014. In announcing his death, the Pittsburgh Tribune-Review heralded him as a judge known for "being able to handle any case." He was succeeded as Chief Judge by Sean J. McLaughlin.

== See also ==
- List of African-American federal judges
- List of African-American jurists
- List of first minority male lawyers and judges in Pennsylvania

== Sources ==
Legal offices
Preceded by Timothy K. Lewis	Judge of the United States District Court for the Western District of Pennsylvania; 1993–2013	Succeeded by Marilyn Horan
Preceded by Donetta Ambrose	Chief Judge of the United States District Court for the Western District of Pennsylvania; 2009–2013	Succeeded by Sean J. McLaughlin
