= Owen McIntosh Burns =

American judge

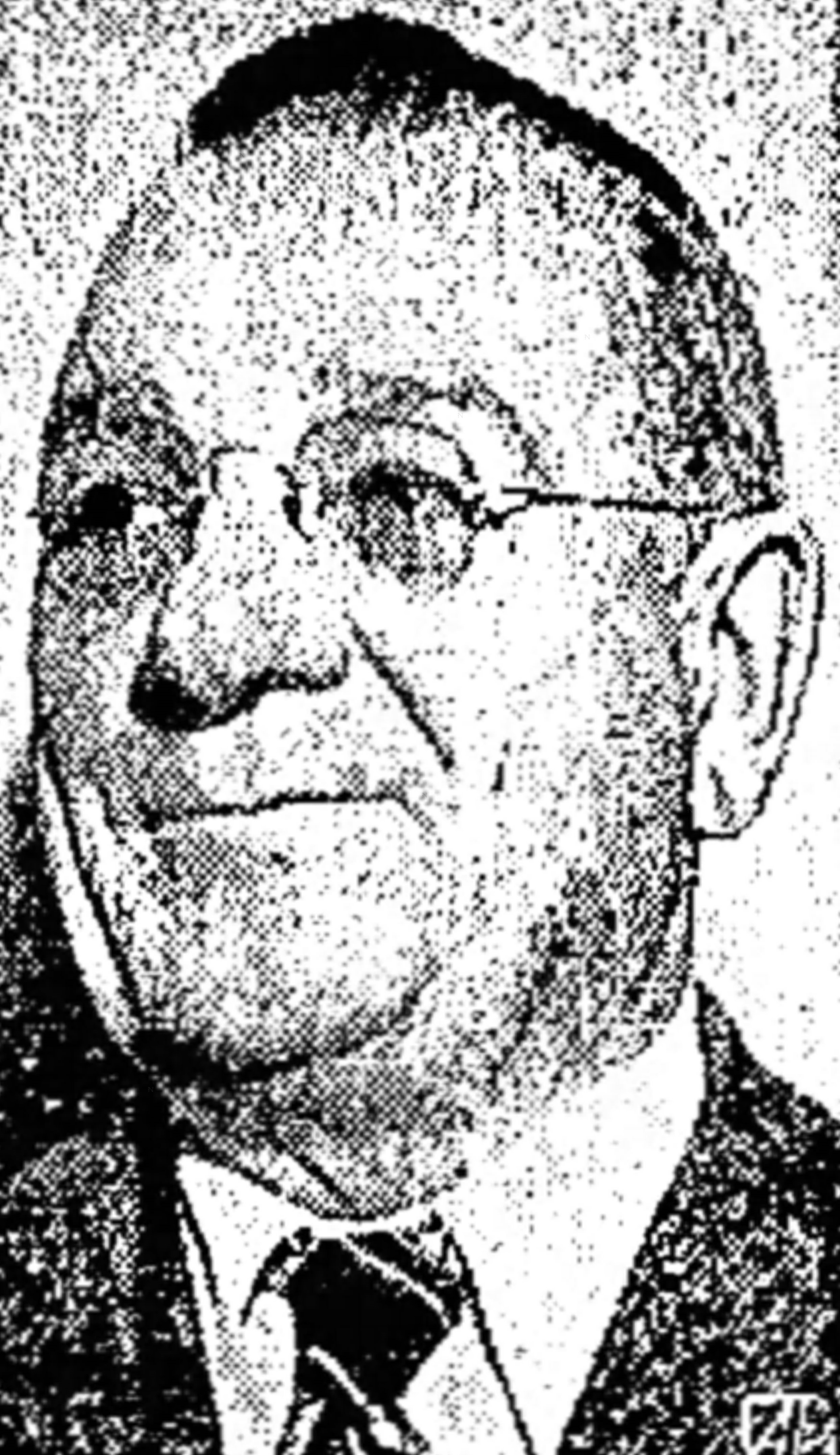

Judge of the United States District Court for the Western District of Pennsylvania
- In office October 21, 1949 – October 26, 1952
- Appointed by: Harry S. Truman
- Preceded by: Seat established by 63 Stat. 493
- Succeeded by: Joseph Putnam Willson

Personal details
- Born: Owen McIntosh Burns; September 6, 1892 Danville, Illinois
- Died: October 26, 1952 (aged 60)
- Education: University of Illinois at Urbana–Champaign (A.B.); University of Illinois College of Law (LL.B.)

Owen McIntosh Burns (September 6, 1892 – October 26, 1952) was a United States district judge of the United States District Court for the Western District of Pennsylvania.

== Education and career ==
Born in Danville, Illinois, Burns received an Artium Baccalaureus degree from the University of Illinois at Urbana–Champaign in 1916. During World War I he served in the United States Army infantry, holding the rank of captain. He received a Bachelor of Laws from the University of Illinois College of Law in 1921. He was in private practice in Erie, Pennsylvania from 1921 until 1947, when he became United States Attorney for the Western District of Pennsylvania, a position he held until 1949.

== Federal judicial service ==
Burns received a recess appointment from President Harry S. Truman on October 21, 1949, to the United States District Court for the Western District of Pennsylvania, to a new seat authorized by 63 Stat. 493. He was nominated to the same position by President Truman on January 5, 1950. He was confirmed by the United States Senate on March 8, 1950, and received his commission on March 9, 1950. His service terminated on October 26, 1952, due to his death.

== Sources ==
Legal offices
Preceded by Seat established by 63 Stat. 493	Judge of the United States District Court for the Western District of Pennsylvania; 1949–1952	Succeeded by Joseph Putnam Willson
