= Barry Slotnick =

American attorney (1948–2025)

Barry I. Slotnick
- Born: June 18, 1939; Bronx, New York, U.S.
- Education: City College of New York; New York University Law School
- Occupation: Attorney
- Spouse: Donna Slotnick
- Children: 4, including Stuart Slotnick

Barry I. Slotnick (June 18, 1939) is an American defense attorney. Slotnick is well known for defending infamous Mafia crime boss, John Gotti and New York City subway shooter, Bernhard Goetz. Along with his son Stuart, he negotiated First Lady Melania Trump's pre-nuptial agreement with Donald Trump. In 2021, he was the subject of a New York Times best seller, The Defense Lawyer, written by author James Patterson, chronicling Slotnick's life.

== Early life ==
Slotnick was born in The Bronx in 1939 to Orthodox Jewish Russian immigrants. He graduated with a B.A. from City College of the City University of New York, a J.D. from New York University Law School, and was admitted to the bar at age 21. After graduating from law school, Slotnick established his own practice in Manhattan. Slotnick specialized in criminal defense, and found clients by sitting in the front row of a court, waiting until the judges would say "Slotnick, the next client is yours." From there, he started his own "boutique law firm" that eventually became Slotnick, Shapiro & Crocker.

== Bernhard Goetz trial ==
In 1985, Slotnick defended Bernhard Goetz, who shot four young black men on a New York City subway. Goetz was charged with attempted murder, assault, reckless endangerment and several firearms offenses. Goetz maintained that he acted in self defense. The trial received national attention. A Manhattan jury found Goetz not guilty of all charges, except an illegal firearms possession count, for which he served two-thirds of a one-year sentence.

The jury decision was based primarily on bullet wounds and shooting witnesses. The New York Times attributed the victory to Slotnick's "clever courtroom tactics," stating that he "turned out to be a shrewder, more accomplished performer than the prosecutor, Gregory Waples." In particular Slotnick's aggressive questioning of James Ramseur, one of the four shot by Goetz, caused Ramseur to react explosively, which resulted in Ramseur's entire testimony being stricken from the record including negative statements Ramseur made about Goetz. This outburst, along with Ramseur's rape conviction and admission of staging his kidnapping by Goetz's agents, greatly influenced the jury.

When later talking about the case, Slotnick said "I've had greater victories and I've had much more difficult cases to try, but for the public perception, for the public need, Goetz was important. Goetz was my public service case."

== Career ==
Originally an appellate attorney, Slotnick eventually began doing high-profile criminal cases that garnered national media attention. In his early 30s, Slotnick defended Mafia boss Joe Colombo in front of the United States Supreme Court and won. Ultimately, the New York Court of Appeals declared New York's contempt statute unconstitutional. He would later be a lead counsel in the first John Gotti trial, which resulted in an acquittal for Gotti and his associates.

Slotnick also represented former Democratic Congressman Mario Biaggi, as well as Vyacheslav Kirillovich Ivankov, who was accused by the United States Department of Justice of being a major boss of the Russian mafia. He then represented casino magnate Steve Wynn, Panamanian dictator Manuel Noriega, and Rabbi Meir Kahane. He also handled the divorce proceedings on behalf of actor Anthony Quinn and of June Gumbel—wife of television personality Bryant Gumbel. Slotnick also represented Tim Richmond during his attempted comeback in 1988, when NASCAR suspended Richmond for testing positive for banned substances.

In 2004, Slotnick worked with his son Stuart to defend retired Army Captain Jay Ferriola pro-bono. Ferriola had been ordered to redeploy to Iraq after completing eight years of service, and then sued the Army on the grounds that they violated his due process rights. The Department of Defense later allowed Ferriola to retire from the Army. The case was the first to challenge the Army's stop-loss policy, which had affected tens of thousands of soldiers since the start of the Iraq War. Slotnick then successfully tried four similar cases.

With his son, Stuart, Slotnick also obtained a settlement for publicly traded company Sportingbet with the U.S. Government's Department of Justice for $30 million and a non-prosecution agreement. This amount was a quarter of what competing site PartyGaming paid in a similar lawsuit. Pursuant to the non prosecution agreement, Sportingbet will not be indicted for their criminal acts in the United States.

During 2005, he merged Slotnick Shapiro & Crocker with Buchanan Ingersoll & Rooney, with which he is currently a partner and shareholder.

Slotnick was a member of the New York Governor's Judicial Selection Committee, Chairman of the New York State Bar Association's Committee on Capital Crimes, and a former Special Deputy Attorney General.

== Personal life ==
Slotnick is married to Donna Slotnick and has four children, one of whom is attorney Stuart Slotnick, best known for defending the company American Apparel.

He once had a 12-year winning streak, and had said that his favorite client was Winnie the Pooh, whom he represented adverse to Disneyland. He received the American Lawyer's AMMY Award as the best defense lawyer in America, was named to the New York Super Lawyer List during 2006, 2007, and 2009, and was included in the American Trial Lawyers Association Top 100 Trial Lawyers of 2009.

== In popular culture ==
Slotnick and his defense of Bernhard Goetz in the 1984 New York City Subway shooting was mentioned in the song Rising to the Top by rappers Sean Price and Agallah.
