= Buchanan Ingersoll & Rooney =

Law firm

Buchanan Ingersoll & Rooney PC
- Headquarters: Union Trust Building; Pittsburgh, Pennsylvania
- No. of offices: 18
- No. of attorneys: approximately 525
- Major practice areas: Lobbying, general practice
- Key people: Joseph A. Dougherty, CEO
- Date founded: 1850 in Pittsburgh
- Founder: Moses Hampton
- Company type: Professional corporation except in California, where it is organized as an LLP
- Website: bipc.com

Buchanan Ingersoll & Rooney PC is an American law firm and lobbying group based in Pittsburgh, Pennsylvania. The firm has more than 500 lawyers in offices in 15 U.S. cities. As of 2022, Buchanan Ingersoll is the third-largest law firm in Pittsburgh by number of attorneys in its Pittsburgh office.

== History ==
The firm was founded in 1850 by Congressman Moses Hampton and his son, John. When Moses Hampton became chief judge of Allegheny County, William C. Moreland was brought in as an additional partner in 1868 and the firm was renamed Hampton & Moreland. The firm continued to grow and went through several name changes before incorporating in 1980. The firm shortened its name to Buchanan Ingersoll P.C. in 1983, and acquired two other firms during the 2000s: Burns, Doane, Swecker & Mathis in 2005, and Klett Rooney Lieber & Schorling PC in 2006, leaving the firm with its current name, Buchanan Ingersoll & Rooney.

In December 2016, the firm announced a strategic affiliation with former Florida governor and presidential candidate Jeb Bush in order to boost the firm's practice in Florida, where it has six offices.

== Practice areas ==
Buchanan Ingersoll & Rooney has 17 law practices in areas including corporate, energy, Marcellus Shale, financial services, health care, intellectual property, labor and employment, immigration, bankruptcy and creditors' rights, tax, real estate, and litigation. The firm also has the largest state-government lobbying practice in Pennsylvania and one of the top 20 federal lobbying practices nationwide.

== Notable lawyers and alumni ==
- Art Rooney II, President of the Pittsburgh Steelers
- David J. Porter, judge on the United States Court of Appeals for the Third Circuit
- Barry Slotnick, New York City defense attorney
- John Dalzell, former U.S. Representative from Pennsylvania
- Moses Hampton, Whig member of the U.S. House of Representatives from Pennsylvania
- Joy Flowers Conti, Chief Judge of the United States District Court for the Western District of Pennsylvania
- Mark R. Hornak, United States District Judge for the Western District of Pennsylvania
- Ralph J. Cappy, former Chief Justice of the Supreme Court of Pennsylvania
- David W. Sweet, former member of the Pennsylvania House of Representatives.

== Offices ==
Headquarters: Pittsburgh, Pennsylvania (Union Trust Building)

- San Diego, California
- Washington, DC
- Wilmington, Delaware
- Fort Lauderdale, Florida
- Miami, Florida
- Tampa, Florida
- Tallahassee, Florida
- Newark, New Jersey
- Princeton, New Jersey
- New York, New York
- Charlotte, North Carolina
- Harrisburg, Pennsylvania
- Philadelphia, Pennsylvania
- Alexandria, Virginia
- Chicago, Illinois
- King of Prussia, Pennsylvania
