= Eric J. Fygi =

American civil servant and lawyer (born 1941)

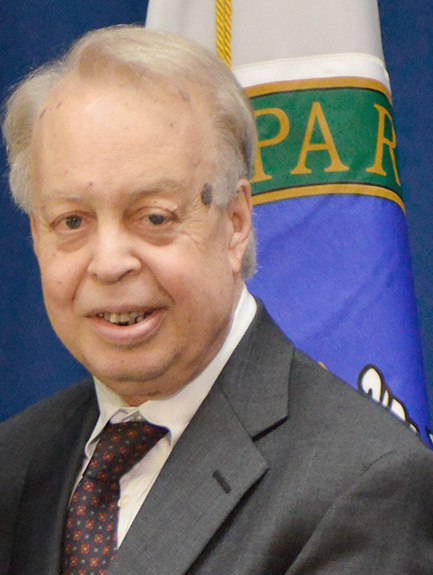

Deputy General Counsel of the Department of Energy
- In office October 1, 1977 – May 18, 2022
- President: See list: Jimmy Carter Ronald Reagan George H. W. Bush Bill Clinton George W. Bush Barack Obama Donald Trump Joe Biden
- Preceded by: Position established

Personal details
- Born: Eric Jan Fygi; October 16, 1941 (age 84) La Jolla, California, U.S.
- Education: Virginia Military Institute (BA); University of California, Hastings College of the Law (JD)

Eric Jan Fygi (born October 16, 1941) is an American civil servant, lawyer, and political aide. He served as the Deputy General Counsel for the United States Department of Energy from the department's founding in October 1977 until 2022, serving for every President of the United States between Jimmy Carter and Joe Biden.

== Early life and education ==
Born in La Jolla, California, Fygi received his Bachelor of Arts in history from the Virginia Military Institute in 1963 and his Juris Doctor from the University of California, Hastings College of Law. He served on the Hastings Law Journal, was the editor-in-chief of the Hastings Voir Dire newspaper, and was president of the student body association.

== Career ==
Previously, Fygi served as the department's Acting General Counsel and worked for the United States Department of Health and Human Services before working in the Department of Energy.

Fygi was responsible for emergency executive actions taken by Presidents Bill Clinton and George W. Bush that, in 2001, prevented the simultaneous collapse of natural gas and electricity service throughout Northern California, following the bankruptcy of the region's major utility. As a result, Fygi testified before the United States Senate Committee on Banking, Housing, and Urban Affairs for the re-authorization of the Defense Production Act of 1950.
