= Joy Flowers Conti =

American judge (born 1948)

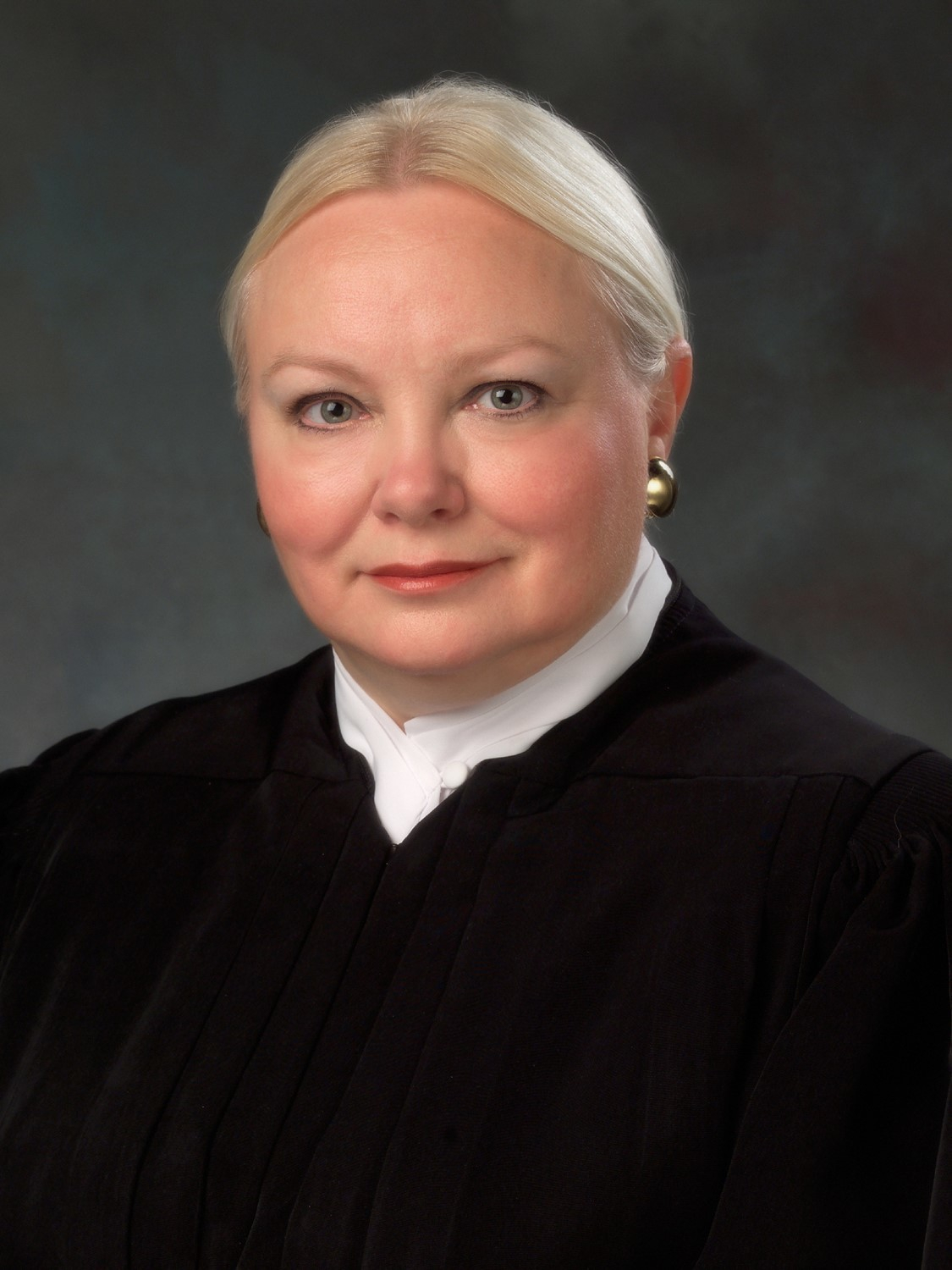

Senior Judge of the United States District Court for the Western District of Pennsylvania
- Incumbent
- Assumed office December 6, 2018

Chief Judge of the United States District Court for the Western District of Pennsylvania
- In office August 17, 2013 – December 6, 2018
- Preceded by: Sean J. McLaughlin
- Succeeded by: Mark R. Hornak

Judge of the United States District Court for the Western District of Pennsylvania
- In office July 31, 2002 – December 6, 2018
- Appointed by: George W. Bush
- Preceded by: Alan N. Bloch
- Succeeded by: William S. Stickman IV

Personal details
- Born: 1948 (age 77–78) Kane, Pennsylvania, U.S.
- Education: Duquesne University (BA, JD)

Joy Flowers Conti (born 1948) is a senior United States district judge of the United States District Court for the Western District of Pennsylvania.

== Early life and education ==
Born in Kane, Pennsylvania, Conti grew up in an army family and graduated from high school in Germany. Conti graduated from Duquesne University with her Bachelor of Arts degree in 1970 where she was a member of Alpha Phi. She later graduated from Duquesne University School of Law with a Juris Doctor in 1973, where she was editor-in-chief of the Duquesne Law Review.

== Legal career ==
Conti began her legal career working as a law clerk for Justice Louis L. Manderino, Supreme Court of Pennsylvania from 1973 to 1974. She was in private practice in Pennsylvania from 1974 to 1976 and again from 1982 to 2002. In 1974, Conti was the first female lawyer hired by Kirkpatrick, Lockhart, Johnson & Hutchinson, now known as K&L Gates, LLP. Conti was a professor of law at Duquesne University School of Law from 1976 to 1982. She was a Hearing examiner (part-time) for the Bureau of Occupational and Professional Affairs, Department of State in Pennsylvania from 1978 to 1982. She returned to Kirkpatrick & Lockhart in 1982. In 1996, she joined Buchanan Ingersoll & Rooney concentrating her practice on bankruptcy, healthcare, general corporate, and nonprofit corporation law.

== Federal judicial career ==
In 2002, Conti was nominated to the United States District Court for the Western District of Pennsylvania by President George W. Bush on January 23, 2002 to a seat vacated by Alan N. Bloch. Conti was confirmed by the Senate on July 29, 2002 on a Senate vote and received her commission on July 31, 2002. She served as chief judge from 2013, upon the resignation of Sean J. McLaughlin, till 2018. She assumed senior status on December 6, 2018.

Legal offices
Preceded by Alan N. Bloch	Judge of the United States District Court for the Western District of Pennsylvania; 2002–2018	Succeeded by William S. Stickman IV
Preceded by Sean J. McLaughlin	Chief Judge of the United States District Court for the Western District of Pennsylvania; 2013–2018	Succeeded by Mark R. Hornak
