= Marilyn Horan =

American judge (born 1954)

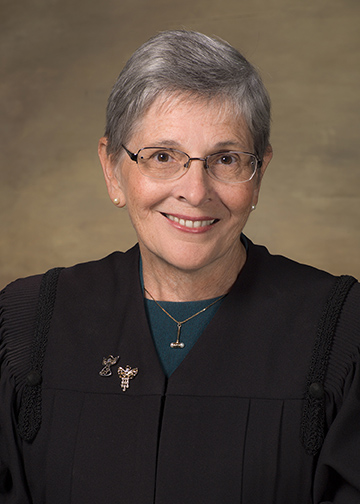

Judge of the United States District Court for the Western District of Pennsylvania
- Incumbent
- Assumed office September 19, 2018
- Appointed by: Donald Trump
- Preceded by: Gary L. Lancaster

Judge of the Court of Common Pleas for Butler County
- In office June 1996 – September 19, 2018
- Appointed by: Tom Ridge

Personal details
- Born: September 13, 1954 (age 71) Butler, Pennsylvania, U.S.
- Party: Republican
- Education: Pennsylvania State University (BA); University of Pittsburgh; School of Law (JD)

Marilyn Jean Horan (born September 13, 1954) is a United States district judge of the United States District Court for the Western District of Pennsylvania.

== Biography ==
Horan received a Bachelor of Arts, magna cum laude, from the Pennsylvania State University in 1976 and her Juris Doctor from the University of Pittsburgh School of Law in 1979. From 1979 to 1996, Horan worked at the Butler, Pennsylvania law firm of Murrin, Taylor, Flach and Horan, where she was elevated to partner, in 1982. From 1996 to 2018, Horan served as a judge of the Butler County Court of Common Pleas in the civil division. During her tenure on the state bench, she also presided over civil and family law cases.

== Federal judicial service ==
=== Expired district court nomination under Obama ===
On July 30, 2015, President Obama nominated Horan to serve as a United States District Judge of the United States District Court for the Western District of Pennsylvania, to the seat vacated by Judge Terrence F. McVerry, who assumed senior status on September 30, 2013. She received a hearing before the Senate Judiciary Committee on December 9, 2015. On January 28, 2016, her nomination was reported out of committee by voice vote. Her nomination expired on January 3, 2017, with the end of the 114th Congress.

=== Renomination to district court under Trump ===
On December 20, 2017, her renomination by President Donald Trump was announced and sent to the United States Senate. Horan was nominated to the seat vacated by Gary L. Lancaster, who died on April 24, 2013. On February 15, 2018, the Senate Judiciary Committee voted to report her nomination by voice vote. On September 6, 2018, her nomination was confirmed by voice vote. She received her judicial commission on September 19, 2018.

== Electoral history ==
1997

Butler County Court of Common Pleas – two positions, November 4, 1997
Party	Candidate	Votes	%
Republican/Democratic	Marilyn Horan	35,408	56.28%
Republican/Democratic	George H. Hancher	27,510	43.72%
Total votes		62,918	100.00%

2007

Butler County Court of Common Pleas – Retain Marilyn Jean Horan, November 6, 2007
Party	Candidate	Votes	%
Nonpartisan	Yes	22,017	71.50%
Nonpartisan	No	8,774	28.50%
Majority		13,243	43.00%
Total votes		30,791	100.00%

2017

Butler County Court of Common Pleas – Retain Marilyn Jean Horan, November 7, 2017
Party	Candidate	Votes	%	±%
Nonpartisan	Yes	17,346	69.44%	−2.06%
Nonpartisan	No	7,634	30.56%	+2.06%
Majority		9,712	38.88%	−4.12%
Total votes		24,980	100.00%	−18.87%

Legal offices
Preceded by Gary L. Lancaster	Judge of the United States District Court for the Western District of Pennsylvania; 2018–present	Incumbent
