= Robert Temple Emmet =

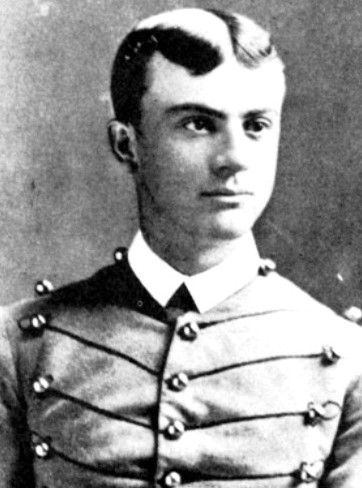
- Born: December 13, 1854; New York City
- Died: October 25, 1936 (aged 81); Ashfield, Massachusetts
- Burial place: Beechwoods Cemetery, New Rochelle, Westchester County, New York
- Military career
- Allegiance: United States
- Branch: United States Army; New York National Guard
- Service years: 1877–1891, 1898–1899 (Army); 1899–1905 (National Guard)
- Rank: Major (Army); Colonel (National Guard)
- Unit: 9th Cavalry Regiment
- Conflicts: American Indian Wars
- Awards: Medal of Honor

Robert Temple Emmet (December 13, 1854 – October 25, 1936) was a United States Army colonel who was a recipient of the Medal of Honor for actions while surrounded by a much larger force. An 1877 graduate of West Point, he served in numerous campaigns on the Western Frontier.

== Education and army career ==
Coat of Arms of Temple Emmet

Emmet was born in New York City to William Jenkins Emmet and Julia Colt Pierson. He is the great-grandson of Thomas Addis Emmet, a lawyer, who was an elder brother of executed Irish Republican Robert Emmet. His father's parents were Robert Emmet and Rosina Hubley. His mother's parents were Josiah G. Pierson and Julia Colt.

He had a twin sister named Rosina Emmet Sherwood and had two other sisters, Lydia Field Emmet and Jane Emmet de Glehn. All three of his sisters were noted portrait artists.

In addition his brothers included, United States Army colonel William Le Roy Emmet; C. Temple Emmet, an attorney and sportsman who was a graduate of the Yale Forest School Class of 1902; William LeRoy Emmet, a graduate of the United States Naval Academy, Class of 1881; Devereux Emmet, who became a prominent golf course architect; and Richard Stockton Emmet. His uncle, John Emmet, attended West Point from 1814 to 1817. His first cousin was portrait artist Ellen Emmet Rand.

Robert Temple Emmet was married to Helena Van Courtlandt Phelps, who died on February 27, 1920, in New York.

He graduated from West Point in 1877 and was commissioned Second Lieutenant, in the 9th Cavalry Regiment of the Buffalo Soldiers upon graduation.

== Medal of Honor citation ==
Emmet received the Medal of Honor for actions at the Battle of Las Animas Canyon, New Mexico in 1879.

Citation: "Lt. Emmet was in G Troop which was sent to relieve a detachment of soldiers under attack by hostile Apaches During a flank attack on the Indian camp, made to divert the hostiles Lt. Emmet and 5 of his men became surrounded when the Indians returned to defend their camp. Finding that the Indians were making for a position from which they could direct their fire on the retreating troop, the Lieutenant held his point with his party until the soldiers reached the safety of a canyon. Lt. Emmet then continued to hold his position while his party recovered their horses. The enemy force consisted of approximately 200."
