= C. Temple Emmet =

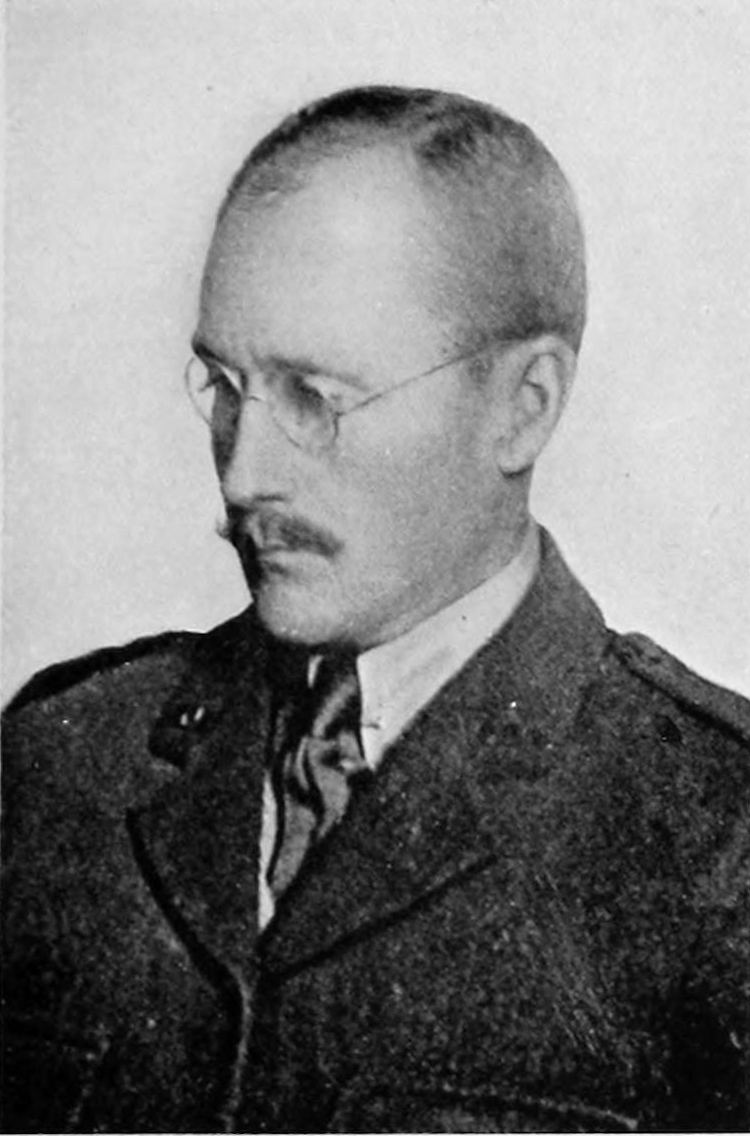
- Born: Christopher Temple Emmet; July 8, 1868; Pelham, New York, U.S.
- Died: July 22, 1957 (aged 89); Stony Brook, New York, U.S.
- Education: Bishop's College School; Yale Forestry School; Stevens Institute of Technology
- Spouse: Alida Beekman Chanler (m. 1896)
- Children: 9
- Parent(s): William Jenkins Emmet; Julia Pierson Emmet
- Relatives: Robert Temple Emmet (brother); Rosina Emmet Sherwood (sister); William LeRoy Emmet (brother); Devereux Emmet (brother); Lydia Field Emmet (sister); Jane Emmet de Glehn (sister); Richard S. Emmet Jr. (uncle); Ellen Emmet Rand (cousin); Edwin D. Morgan III (grandson)

Christopher Temple Emmet (July 8, 1868 – July 22, 1957) was an American attorney and sportsman.

== Early life ==
Coat of Arms of C. Temple Emmet

Emmet was born on July 8, 1868, in Pelham, New York. He was one of ten children born to William Jenkins Emmet (1826–1905) and Julia Colt (née Pierson) Emmet (1829–1908). His siblings included Robert Temple Emmet, who was awarded the Medal of Honor; Rosina Hubley Emmet, a painter who was the mother of playwright Robert E. Sherwood; William LeRoy Emmet, an electrical engineer; Devereux Emmet, a pioneering golf course architect; Richard Stockton Emmet; Lydia Field Emmet, a prominent portraitist; and Jane Erin Emmet, also a prominent portraitist who married British impressionist painter Wilfrid de Glehn.

His maternal grandparents were Josiah Gilbert Pierson and Julia Boudinot (née Colt) Pierson and his paternal grandparents were Judge Robert Emmet and Rosina (née Hubley) Emmet. His father was a grandson of New York Attorney General Thomas Addis Emmet. Two of his uncles, Richard Stockton Emmet and Christopher Temple Emmet, were married to sisters, Katharine "Kitty" Temple and Ellen James "Bay" Temple, both first cousins of British author Henry James.

After preparing at Bishop's College School in Lennoxville, Quebec, and Stevens High School, Emmet attended the Yale Forestry School and the Stevens Institute of Technology, where he graduated from with a M.E. degree in 1891.

== Career ==
After taking a law degree, he practiced law for a short period of time before travelling to Europe, later spending much of his time there. He served during the Spanish–American War, and during World War I, he was a Red Cross official and training officer. He was also a member of Squadron A of the New York National Guard.

At a time when skiing was relatively unknown in the United States, Emmet was one of the first Americans to go skiing in Norway and Switzerland. He was also one of the first members of the Racquet and Tennis Club in New York City, and the Academy of Sciences, the American Geographical Society, the National Geographic Society, the New York Zoological Society, the American Museum of Natural History, the American Forestry Association, the Metropolitan Museum of Art, the Audubon Society, the Knickerbocker Club, the St. Anthony Club of New York, the Tobique Salmon Club, and the Ore Hill Shooting Club.

=== Residence ===
The Emmets lived at The Mallows, an estate located in Stony Brook, New York, at Head of the Harbor in Suffolk County, New York. The Colonial revival home was designed in 1906 by architect Charles A. Platt, finished in stucco with wooden detailing at the principal doorways, roof cornice and porch. At the Mallows, he "engaged in farming."

== Personal life ==
On October 27, 1896, Emmet was married to Alida Beekman Chanler (1873–1969) at Red Hook, New York, by the Bishop of New York. Alida was the daughter of former U.S. Representative John Winthrop Chanler and Margaret Astor (née Ward) Chanler. Among Alida's siblings were John Armstrong Chaloner, Winthrop Astor Chanler; Elizabeth Astor Winthrop Chanler (wife of John Jay Chapman); William Astor Chanler (who married Beatrice Ashley); Lewis Stuyvesant Chanler (who married Julia Lynch Olin); Margaret Livingston Chanler (who married Richard Aldrich) and Robert Winthrop Chanler (who married Lina Cavalieri). Together, they were the parents of nine children, including:

- Elizabeth Winthrop Emmet (1897–1934), who married Edwin D. Morgan Jr. (1890–1954), a descendant of Edwin D. Morgan, the 21st Governor of New York, a U.S. Senator, and the longest-serving chairman of the Republican National Committee.
- Margaret Chanler Emmet (1899–c. 1970), who married Francis Harrison Kinnicutt (1875–1939). After his death, she married John Benton Prosser in 1941.
- Christopher Temple Emmet Jr. (1900–1974)
- Hester Alida Emmet (1901–1965), who married architect John Louis Bancel LaFarge, a grandson of artist John La Farge.
- Egerton Chanler Emmet (1907–1907), who died in infancy.
- Jane Erin Emmet (1908–1997)
- Winthrop Stuyvesant Emmet (1910–2001), who married four times.
- William Patten Emmet (1911–1977)
- Thomas Addis Emmet (1915–1990), who lived at Amberley Castle in Sussex, England.

Emmet died on July 22, 1957, at his home in Stony Brook overlooking the Long Island Sound. His widow died on August 31, 1969, and after a mass at St. Philip and James Roman Catholic Church, she was buried at St. Patrick's Cemetery in Hauppauge, New York.

=== Descendants ===
Through his daughter Elizabeth, he was a grandfather of Edwin D. Morgan III (1921–2001), who married Nancy Marie Whitney, the daughter of Cornelius Vanderbilt Whitney and Marie Norton Harriman (the second wife of New York governor W. Averell Harriman). Her paternal grandparents were Harry Payne Whitney and Gertrude Vanderbilt Whitney, an artist and the founder of the Whitney Museum in New York City.
