= Julia Pierson Emmet =

American illustrator and painter

- Portrait of Julia Colt Pierson Emmet; by Rosina Emmet Sherwood
- Born: Julia Colt Pierson; 1829; Ramapo, New York, U.S.
- Died: September 26, 1908 (aged 78–79); New Rochelle, New York, U.S.
- Known for: Painting
- Spouse: William Jenkins Emmet (m. 1854; died 1905)

Julia Colt Pierson Emmet (1829 – September 26, 1908) was an American illustrator and painter.

== Early life ==
Julia was born in Ramapo in Rockland County, New York. She was the daughter of Josiah Gilbert Pierson (1797–1845) and Julia Boudinot (née Colt) Pierson (1795–1830). Among her siblings was Sarah Colt, who was killed with her husband, the Rev. Robert McMullen, in the rebellion in Cawnpore during the 1857 uprising, by order of Nana Sahib. Her father was an inventor who established the ironworks firm of J. G. Pierson & Brothers in Ramapo.

Her maternal grandparents were Hon. Peter Colt, the Connecticut State Treasurer, and Sarah (née Lyman) Colt; and her maternal uncle was Roswell Lyman Colt. Her paternal grandparents were U.S. Representative Jeremiah H. Pierson and Sarah (née Colt) Pierson. Through her father, she was seventh in descent from Abraham Pierson, the first president of Yale University. The first American Pierson, Abraham Pierson the Elder, came to Boston in 1639 from Yorkshire, England and helped found Southampton, New York, Stamford, Connecticut, and Newark, New Jersey. Among her large extended family was uncle Eleazar Lord (wife of her aunt Elizabeth Pierson); her cousins included Brigadier General John Frederick Pierson and Helen Maria Pierson, who married William Gaston Hamilton (son of John Church Hamilton and grandson of first U.S. Treasury Secretary Alexander Hamilton).

== Painting ==
She studied art with Daniel Huntington. Emmet was known as a painter and illustrator.

== Personal life ==
Julia was married to William Jenkins Emmet (1826–1905), a son of Judge Robert Emmet and Rosina (née Hubley) Emmet, and grandson of New York Attorney General Thomas Addis Emmet. Two of Emmet's brothers, Richard Stockton Emmet and Christopher Temple Emmet, were married to sisters, Katharine "Kitty" Temple and Ellen James Temple, both first cousins of Henry James, with whom Julia corresponded. Together, the couple had ten children, including a daughter, Julia Colt Emmet, who died young. Their children who lived beyond infancy were:

- Robert Temple Emmet (1854–1936), who served in the army and was awarded the Medal of Honor.
- Rosina Hubley Emmet (1854–1948), who was a painter and the mother of playwright Robert E. Sherwood.
- William LeRoy Emmet (1858–1941), who was an electrical engineer and the leading advocate of the electrical propulsion of ships by turbine.
- Devereux Emmet (1861–1934), who was a pioneering golf course architect and amateur golfer.
- Richard Stockton Emmet (1863–1961)
- Lydia Field Emmet (1866–1952), who was a prominent portraitist.
- Christopher Temple Emmet (1868–1957), who married Alida Beekman Chanler, daughter of John Winthrop Chanler. They lived at The Mallows.
- Thomas Addis Emmet (1870–1886), who died aged fifteen.
- Jane Erin Emmet (1873–1961), who was also a prominent portraitist and married British impressionist painter Wilfrid de Glehn.

Julia died in New Rochelle, New York on September 26, 1908. Her funeral was held at Christ Church in Pelham Manor, New York.
