= Jane Emmet de Glehn =

American painter

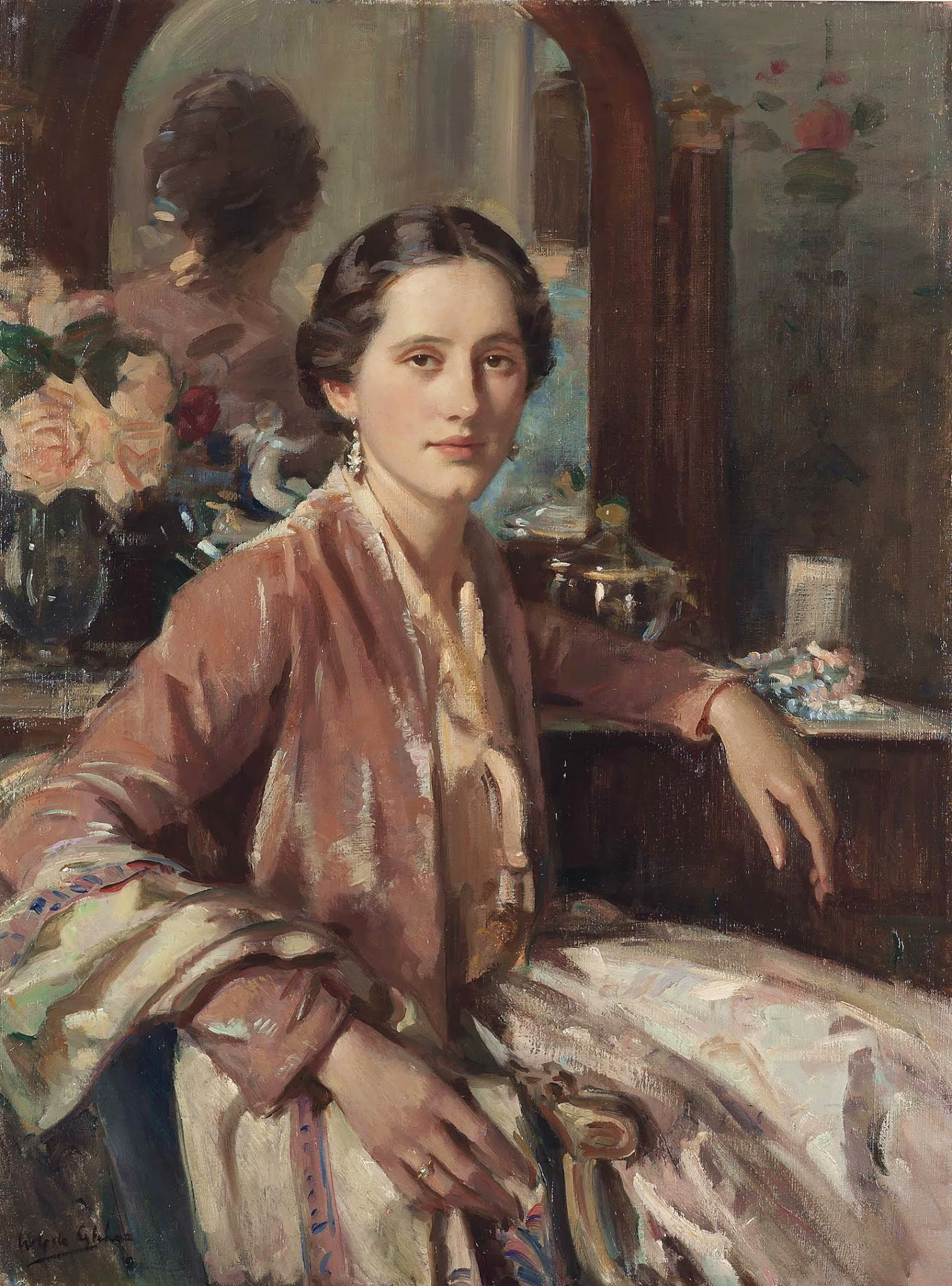
- The Beloved (Jane Emmet de Glehn) by Wilfrid de Glehn c. 1905
- Born: Jane Erin Emmet; 1873; New Rochelle, New York
- Died: 20 February 1961 (aged 87–88)
- Known for: Painting, portraiture
- Spouse: Wilfrid Glehn (m. 1904; died 1951)

Jane Erin Emmet de Glehn (born Jane Erin Emmet; 1873 – 20 February 1961) was an American figure and portrait painter.

== Early life ==
Born in New Rochelle, New York, she was the youngest daughter of ten siblings born to William J. Emmet and the illustrator and painter Julia Colt Pierson Emmet . Her great-great-uncle Robert Emmet was a notable Irish nationalist who was hanged in 1803 for high treason by the British court for his attempt to implement an Irish rebellion. Lydia Field Emmet's great-grandfather Thomas Addis Emmet, Robert's older brother, emigrated to the United States after Robert's execution. Thomas Addis Emmet would later become the New York State Attorney General. His daughter Elizabeth Emmet (b.1794), Jane's great-aunt, would study portraiture under the direction of a steamboat designer and portrait artist named Thomas Fulton.

Both her older sisters Rosina Emmet Sherwood and Lydia Field Emmet would also become successful artists, as well as their first cousin Ellen Emmet "Bay" Rand. Emmet de Glehn's brother, William Le Roy Emmet, was an accomplished engineer employed by General Electric; a graduate of the United States Naval Academy at Annapolis, he was a pioneer in the areas of current electricity and power generation, best known for his work with steam turbines, mercury vapor, and electric ship propulsion. Her brother Robert Temple Emmet was a West Point graduate, and Medal of Honor recipient. Her brother Devereux Emmet was a pioneering American golf course architect who, according to one source, designed more than 150 courses worldwide. Her brother Christopher Temple Emmet was a noted attorney and sportsman. She is the aunt of the American playwright Robert Emmet Sherwood.

== Early career ==
Jane Emmet's career began while studying at the New York's Art Students League and she later studied under Frederick William MacMonnies in Paris. She then travelled in Europe to view the work of the Grand Masters and continue her studies.

== Wilfrid de Glehn and John Singer Sargent ==
After returning to America, she met and married the British impressionist painter Wilfrid de Glehn in 1904 in New Rochelle, New York. Following their marriage, the couple honeymooned in Cornwall, England, vacationed in Paris and Venice, and made a permanent home in Chelsea, London.

In England, Jane continued to draw and paint, exhibiting her work at the New English Art Club, the Royal Academy and the Royal Hibernian Academy. She worked in the mediums of chalk and charcoal as well as oil on board and canvas. The young couple became frequent travelling companions of the American painter John Singer Sargent, whom Jane Emmet de Glehn had met at a performance by the dancer Carmencita in 1890, and between 1905 and 1914 the trio often depicted each other in their works whilst travelling throughout Europe.

When World War I broke out, Jane and Wilfrid joined the staff of a British hospital for French soldiers, Hôpital Temporaire d'Arc-en-Barrois, Haute-Marne, France in January 1915. On their return to England the following year, Wifrid was commissioned and seconded to the Front in Italy in 1917. After the war they returned to England, and Wilfrid held a solo exhibition at the Leicester Galleries and another solo show in New York in 1920. For the next decade, the two would spend summers in Cornwall and winters in France.

== Later life ==
Unlike her sisters, or her cousin Ellen Emmet Rand, or her husband, Jane Emmet de Glehn was not a prolific artist; after 1913, she generally exhibited her work alongside that of her husband. During the 1930s and 1940s, Jane had a studio in New York. In 1940, she shared an exhibition with her sister Lydia Field Emmet, and like her sisters and cousin, preferred to mostly work in portraiture. After her husband's death in 1951, Jane Emmet de Glehn spent much of her time casually sketching her extended family and members of her social circle. She and Wilfrid had no children and she died in 1961.

== Legacy ==
In late April 2007, Arden Galleries in Manhattan held a family exhibit of five generations of the Emmet women's paintings. The 130 exhibits by 14 artists began with nine portraits by Jane Emmet de Glehn's great-aunt Elizabeth Emmet (a.k.a. Elizabeth Emmet LeRoy) and ended with nine sculptures by great-great-grandniece Julia Townsend, aged 22, and with two by Beulah Emmet, aged 18.

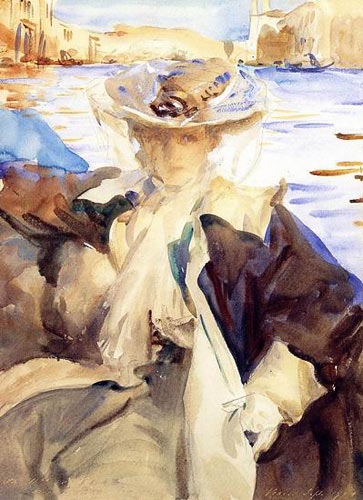
Jane Erin Emmet de Glehn en 1904 à Venise, John Singer Sargent

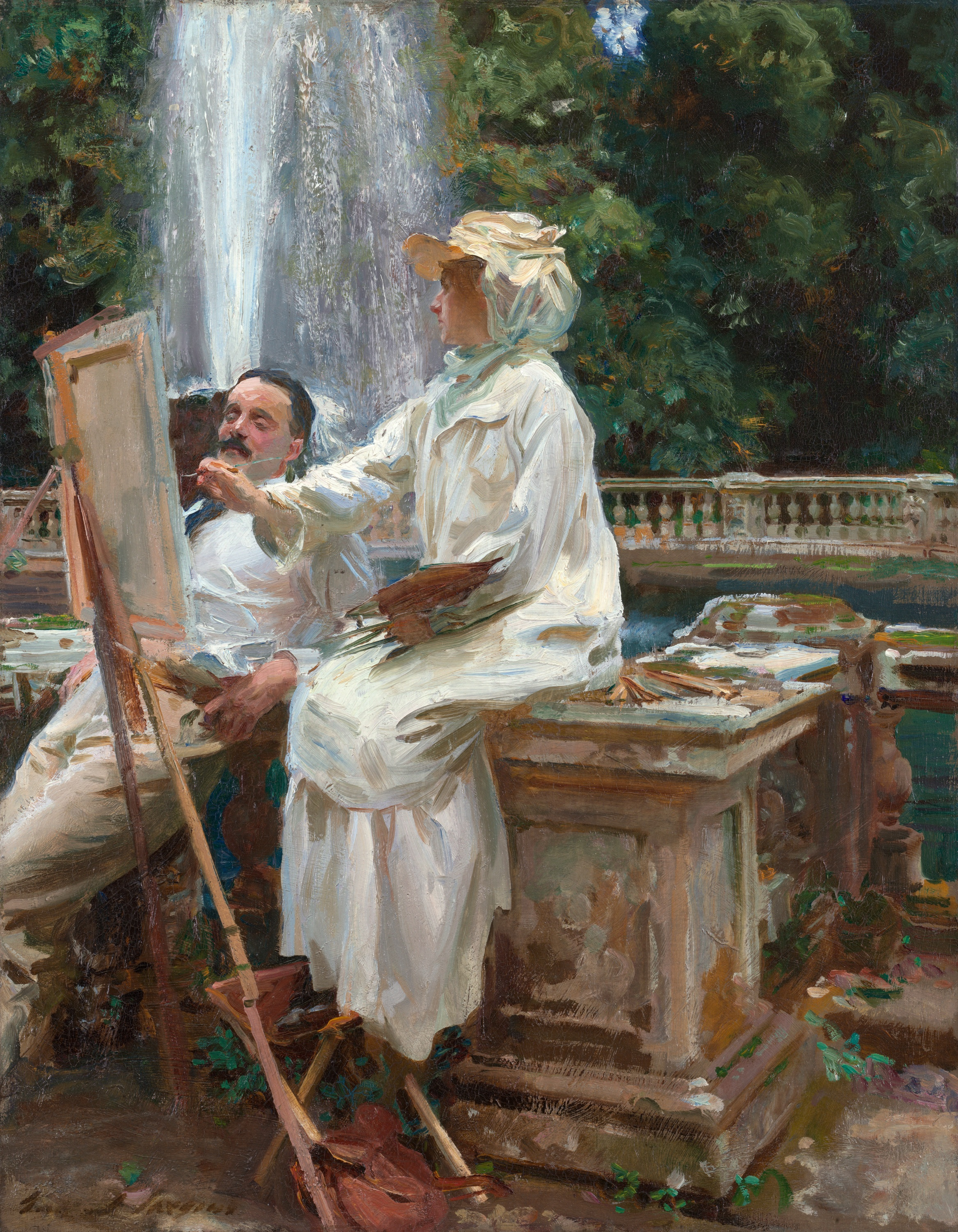
La Fontaine, Villa Torlonia (Frascati), 1907, John Singer Sargent

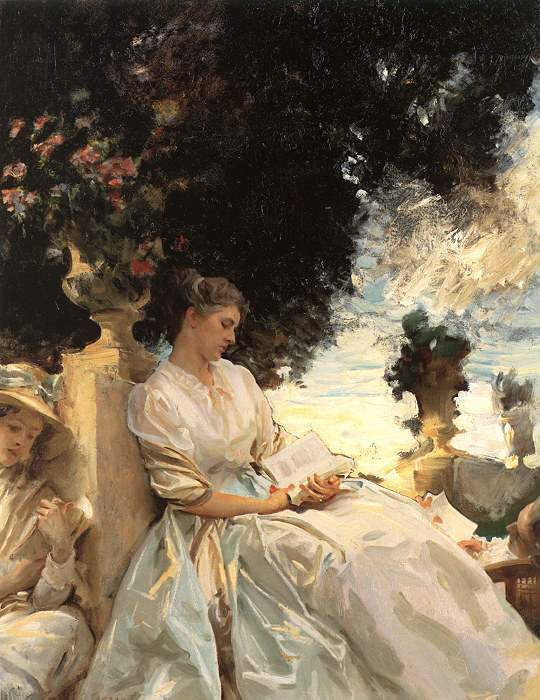
Jane Emmet de Glehn à Corfu, 1909

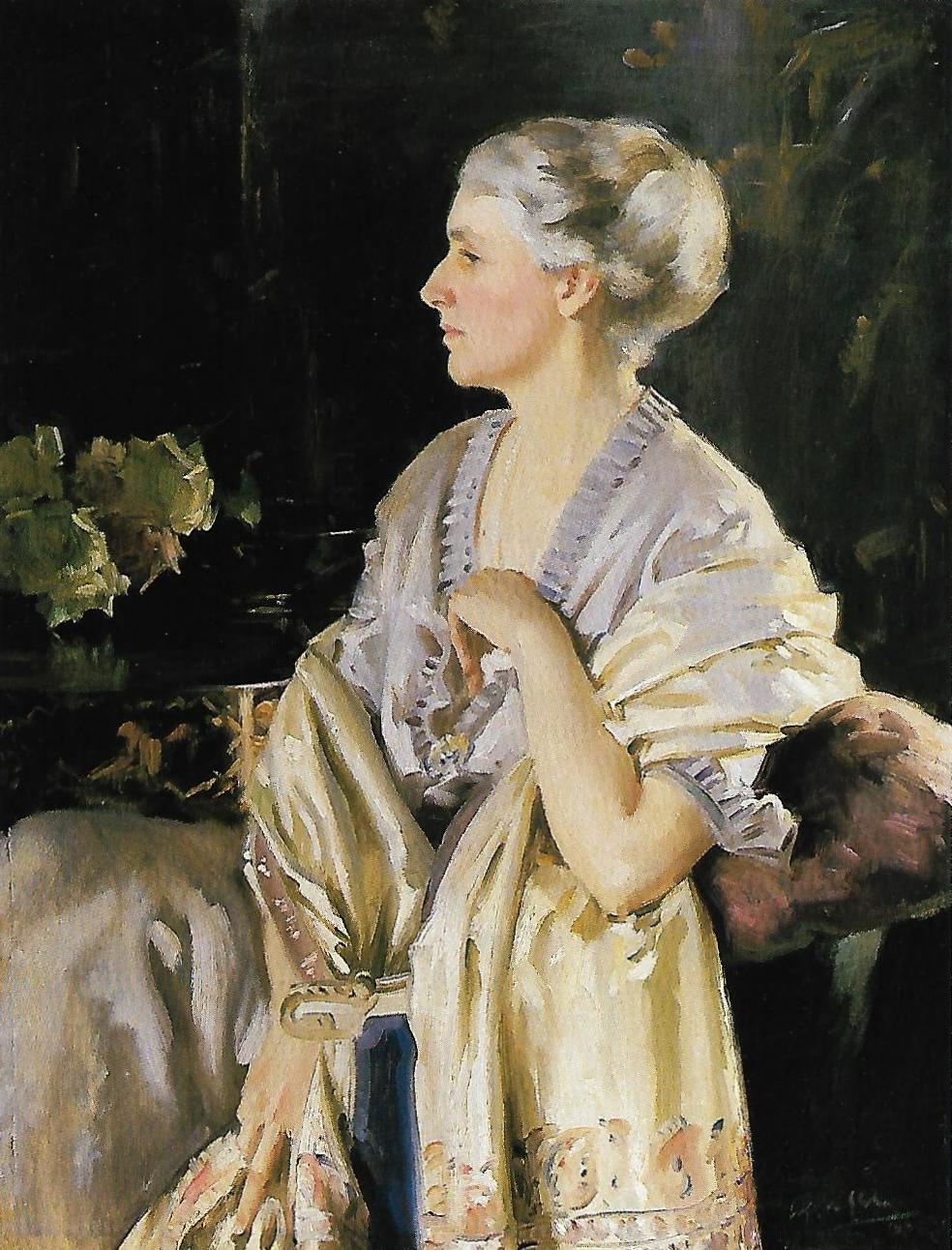
Portrait of Jane Emmet De Glehn, c. 1925, Wilfrid de Glehn
