= Lydia Field Emmet =

American artist (1866–1952)

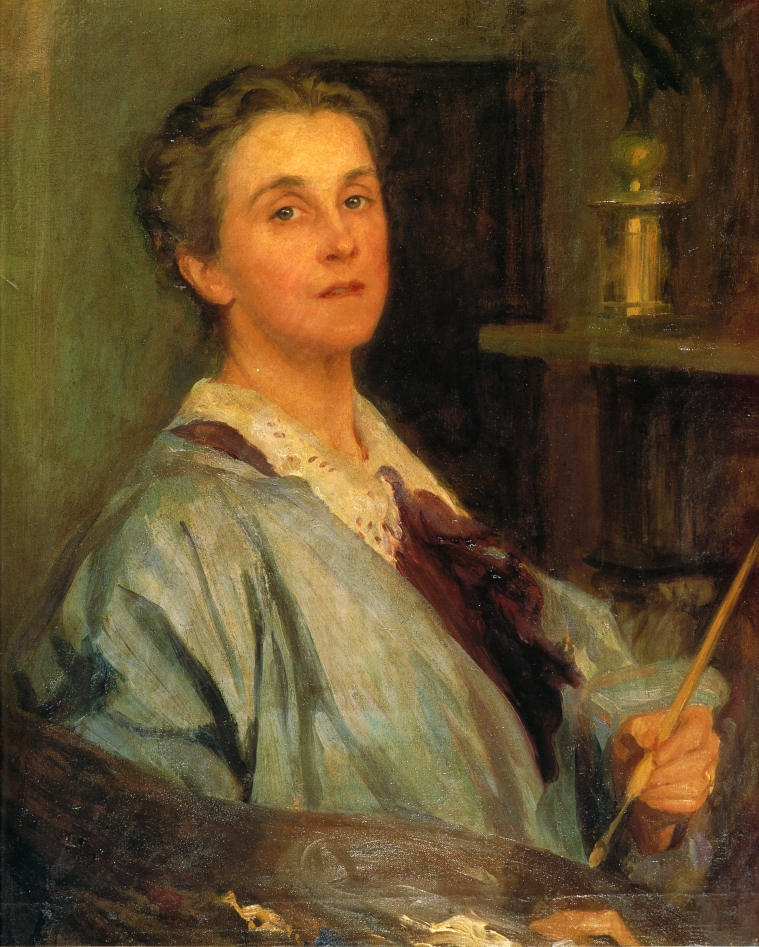
- "Self Portrait". 1912. Oil on canvas
- Born: January 23, 1866; New Rochelle, New York
- Died: August 16, 1952 (aged 86)
- Known for: Painting, Portraiture

Lydia Field Emmet (January 23, 1866 – August 16, 1952) was an American artist best known for her work as a portraitist. She studied with, among others, prominent artists such as William Merritt Chase, Harry Siddons Mowbray, Kenyon Cox and Tony Robert-Fleury. Emmet exhibited widely during her career, and her paintings can now be found hanging in the White House, and many prestigious art galleries, including the Metropolitan Museum of Art.

== Early life and family ==
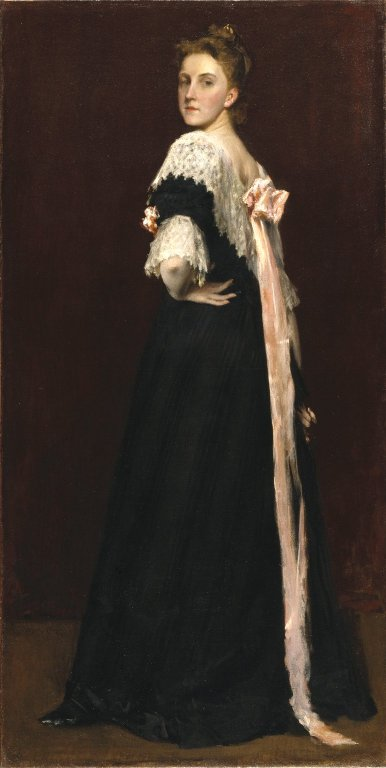
Lydia Field Emmet, portrait by William Merritt Chase

Emmet was born on January 23, 1866, at New Rochelle, New York, the seventh of eight children born to merchant William Jenkins Emmet and illustrator Julia Colt Pierson.

Emmet's paternal great-grandfather, Thomas Addis Emmet, was a prominent lawyer who later served as New York State Attorney General. Thomas was an Irish nationalist who held a pivotal position in the Dublin Society of the United Irishmen after the failure of the Irish Rebellion of 1798. In historical accounts of the period, Thomas is overshadowed by his younger brother Robert Emmet, who was hanged in 1803 for high treason by the British government, for his abortive attempt to implement an Irish rebellion. Thomas immigrated to the United States with his family shortly after the execution of his brother.

Emmet's paternal grandfather, Judge Robert Emmet (1792–1873), married Rosina Hubley, served as the captain of a cavalry regiment in the War of 1812, and followed in his father's footsteps becoming a prominent New York jurist. He retained an interest in Irish politics, and served as president of the Repeal Movement in the United States, "in sympathy with the efforts of Daniel O'Connell to bring about a repeal of the so-termed union with England."

Emmet's maternal grandfather, Josiah G. Pierson, was an inventor who established the firm of J. G. Pierson & Brothers in Ramapo, New York; an iron works that manufactured cut nails. Pierson is believed to have invented the first properly functioning nail-cutting machine, with a patent registered for this device in 1795. Josiah was the son of Congressman Jeremiah Halsey Pierson (1766–1855).

Emmet's two surviving sisters, Rosina Emmet Sherwood (1854–1948) and Jane Emmet de Glehn (1873–1961), also became successful artists, as did their first cousin Ellen Emmet ("Bay") Rand (1876–1941).

One of Emmet's brothers, William LeRoy Emmet, was an accomplished engineer employed by General Electric. A graduate of the United States Naval Academy at Annapolis, he was a pioneer in the areas of current electricity and power generation, best known for his work with steam turbines, mercury vapor, and electric ship propulsion. Another of her brothers was Robert Temple Emmet, a West Point graduate, and Medal of Honor recipient. Her brother Devereux Emmet was a pioneering American golf course architect who, according to one source, designed more than 150 courses worldwide. Her brother Christopher Temple Emmet was a noted attorney and sportsman.

== Education ==
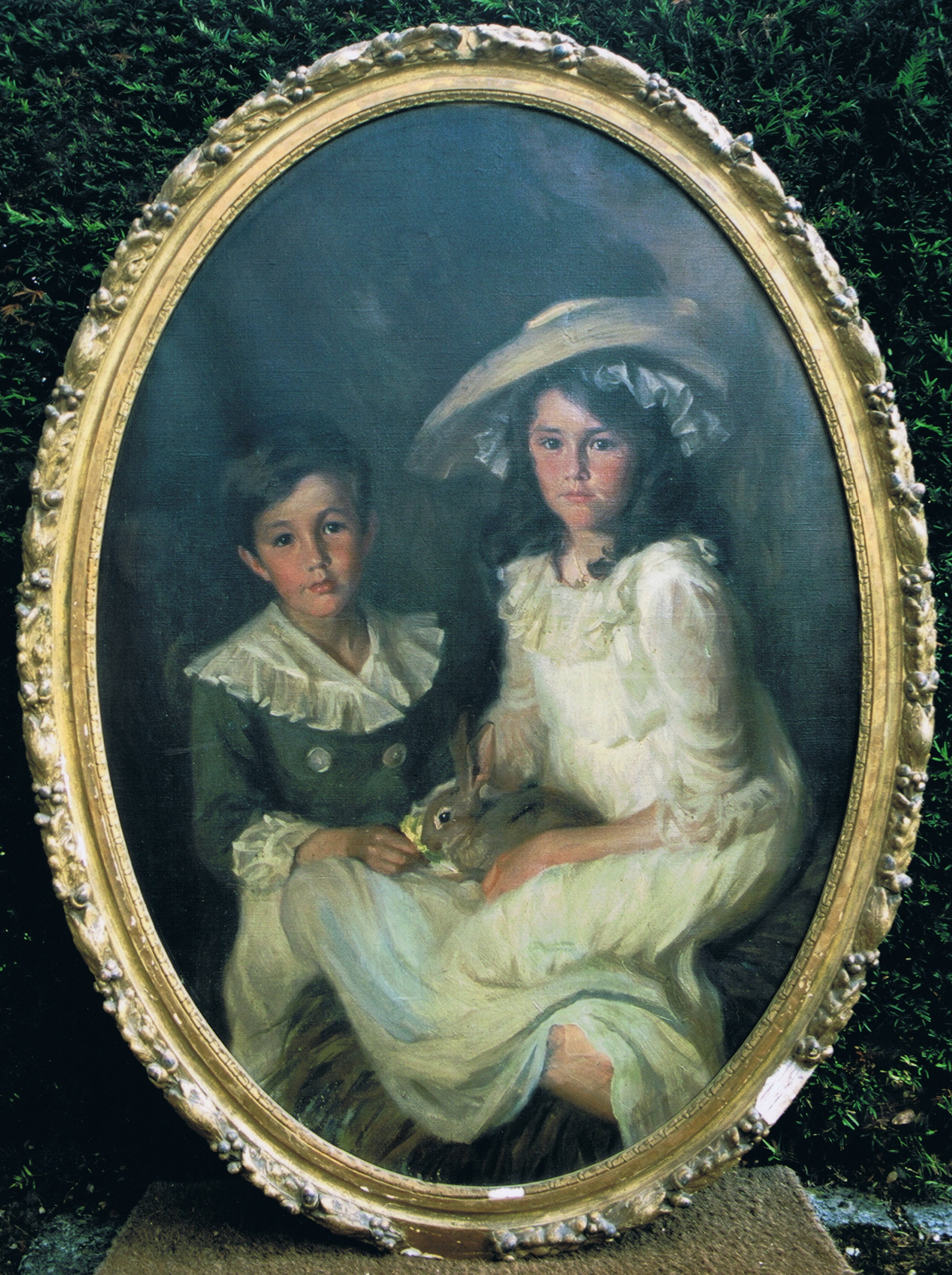
Portrait of two members of the Cross family, Newport, Rhode Island, 1903

Emmet was given her first art lessons as a child by her older sister Rosina. Emmet and Rosina went on to attend the Académie Julian in Paris, France in 1884–1885. The Emmet family had suffered severe economic setbacks in the aftermath of the Civil War. The sisters were able to study abroad only after receiving an inheritance from their cousin, Bache Whitlock. However, the Emmets were disappointed with Julian's, and Rosina commented that the admission standards were "so low that it is not very inspiring. If they (instructors) criticized conscientiously they would punch holes through some of the vile paintings and make them begin from drawing casts." The Emmets did hold a high opinion of at least one of their instructors, Tony Robert-Fleury, whom Lydia found to be "so much brisker and more severe and decided, besides being very inspiring."

After returning to New York, the Emmet sisters, and their cousin Ellen, became students of notable American painter and instructor William Merritt Chase. During her tenure in New York City, Emmet also studied with such artists as: Harry Siddons Mowbray, Kenyon Cox and Robert Reid. She continued her training in Paris with William-Adolphe Bouguereau, Louis-Joseph-Raphaël Collin, Tony Robert-Fleury, and the American sculptor and painter Frederick William MacMonnies. She worked mainly in the mediums of watercolor and oil.

While studying in Europe, Emmet and her cousin Ellen joined a summer colony of American artists, including John Leslie Breck and Theodore Robinson, at Hotel Baudy near Claude Monet's home in Giverny, France.

== Career ==
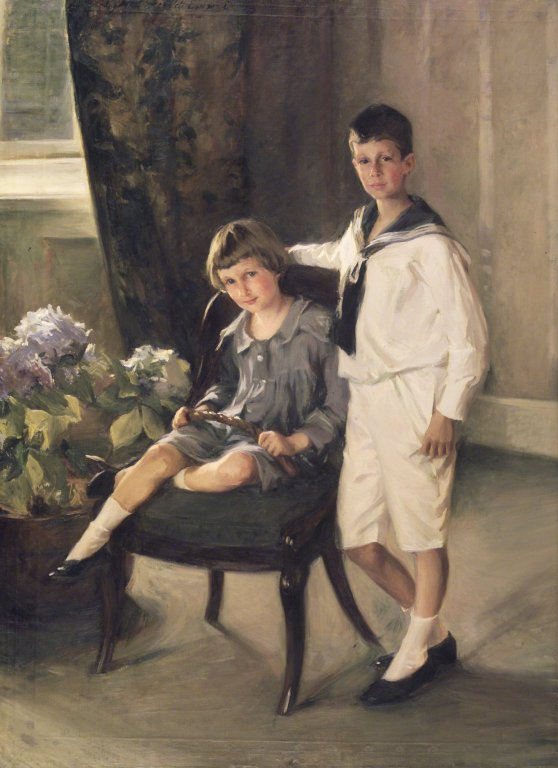
The Brothers, ca. 1909, Brooklyn Museum

One of Emmet's first artistic achievements came in 1883, at the age of sixteen, when she was commissioned to illustrate Henrietta Christian Wright's children's book Little Folk in Green.

In order to supplement her income, Emmet worked during the early 1890s as the assistant of her former instructor, William Merritt Chase, teaching preparatory classes at his Shinnecock Hills Summer School of Art on Long Island, New York.

In 1893, Emmet was selected, along with prominent women American artists such as Mary Cassatt, Mary MacMonnies-Low, Lucia Fairchild Fuller and her sister, Rosina (Emmet) Sherwood, to paint murals in the newly constructed Woman's Building at the World's Columbian Exposition. Emmet's contributions included a painting entitled Seal of the New York State Board and a mural entitled Art, Literature and Imagination.

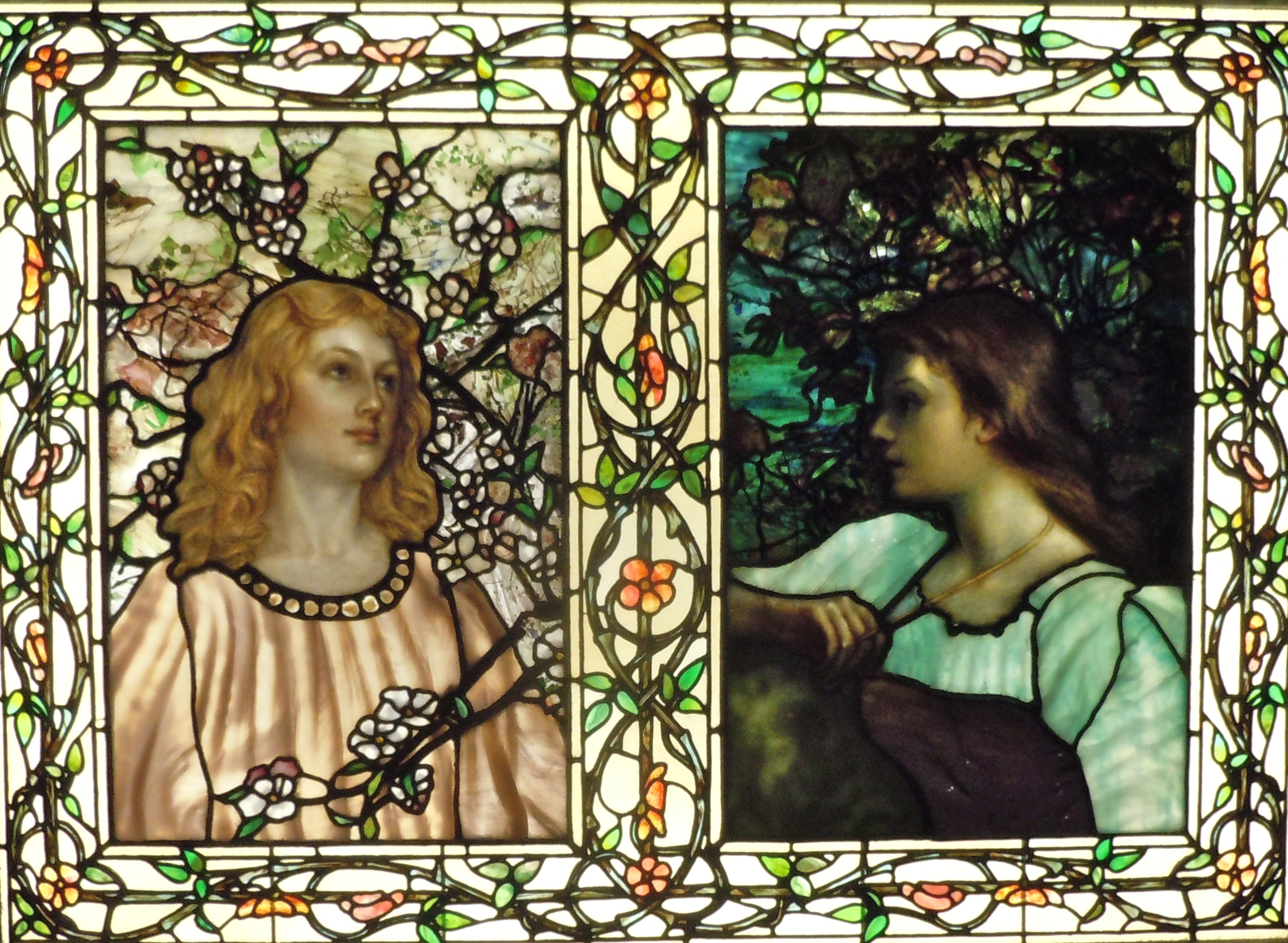
Spring and Autumn stained glass window designed by Lydia Field Emmet for the Samuel Bankcroft House in Wilmington, Delaware. Now at the Delaware Art Museum.

Emmet later designed stained glass windows for Louis Comfort Tiffany and was a prolific illustrator for Harper's Bazaar magazine. She also received commissions from the Associated Artists, and a commission from President Herbert Hoover to paint an official portrait of the First Lady, Lou Henry Hoover, which now hangs in the White House.

In 1896 Field Emmet designed the Cullum Geographical Medal, one of the oldest awards of the American Geographical Society, established in the will of Major General George Washington Cullum (1809–92), the vice president of the Society, and is awarded "to those who distinguish themselves by geographical discoveries or in the advancement of geographical science".

Though best known for her portraits of children, Emmet preferred to paint adult sitters, as she did not consider child portraits to be especially challenging work. One of Emmet's most famous portraits is that of her young nephew, playwright Robert Emmet Sherwood.

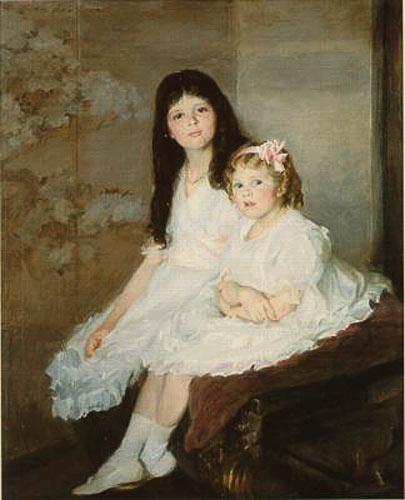
"Miss Ginnie and Polly", ca. 1916

Emmet exhibited her work frequently at the National Academy of Design, and participated in several major international expositions. She was the recipient of prizes at the World's Columbian Exposition (1893), the Atlanta Exposition (1895), the Pan-American Exhibition (1901), the St. Louis Exhibition (1904) and the Carnegie International Exhibition (1912). Emmet was also awarded the Thomas R. Proctor Prize (1907) and the Maynard Prize (1918) from the National Academy of Design; the Newport popular prize (1921, 1923); and the Philadelphia Bok prize (1925). Emmet was made an associate of the National Academy of Design in 1909 and in 1911 was promoted to Academician at the academy.

== Legacy ==
In late April 2007, Arden Galleries in Manhattan held an exhibition of paintings by five generations of women in the Emmet family. It consisted of 130 exhibits by 14 artists, beginning with nine portraits by Lydia Field Emmet's great-aunt Elizabeth Emmet, and ending with sculptures by her great-great-grandnieces Julia Townsend and Beulah Emmet.

== Memberships ==
- American Federation of Arts
- American Society of Miniature Painters (ASMP)
- Art Students League of New York
- Connecticut Academy of Fine Arts
- National Academy of Design
- National Association of Portrait Painters
- National Association of Women Artist
- New York Watercolor Club
- Stockbridge Art Association

== Institutions in possession of works by Lydia Field Emmet ==
- Berkshire Museum, Pittsfield, Massachusetts
- Brooklyn Museum, New York City
- Castle Hill on the Crane Estate, Ipswich, Massachusetts
- Delaware Art Museum, Wilmington, Delaware
- Groton School, Groton, Massachusetts
- Lyme Academy of Fine Arts, Lyme Academy Gallery, Old Lyme, Connecticut
- Metropolitan Museum of Art, New York City
- Museum of the City of New York
- National Academy of Design, New York City, New York
- National Gallery of Art, Washington, D.C.
- National Museum of Women in the Arts, Washington, D.C.
- National Society of Colonial Dames of America, State of Vermont
- New York Historical Society
- Newport Art Museum, Newport, Rhode Island
- Old Westbury Gardens, Old Westbury, New York
- Parrish Art Museum, Southampton, New York
- RISD Museum, Providence, Rhode Island
- United States Military Academy Museum, West Point, New York
- White House, Washington, D.C.
