= Rosina Emmet Sherwood =

American painter

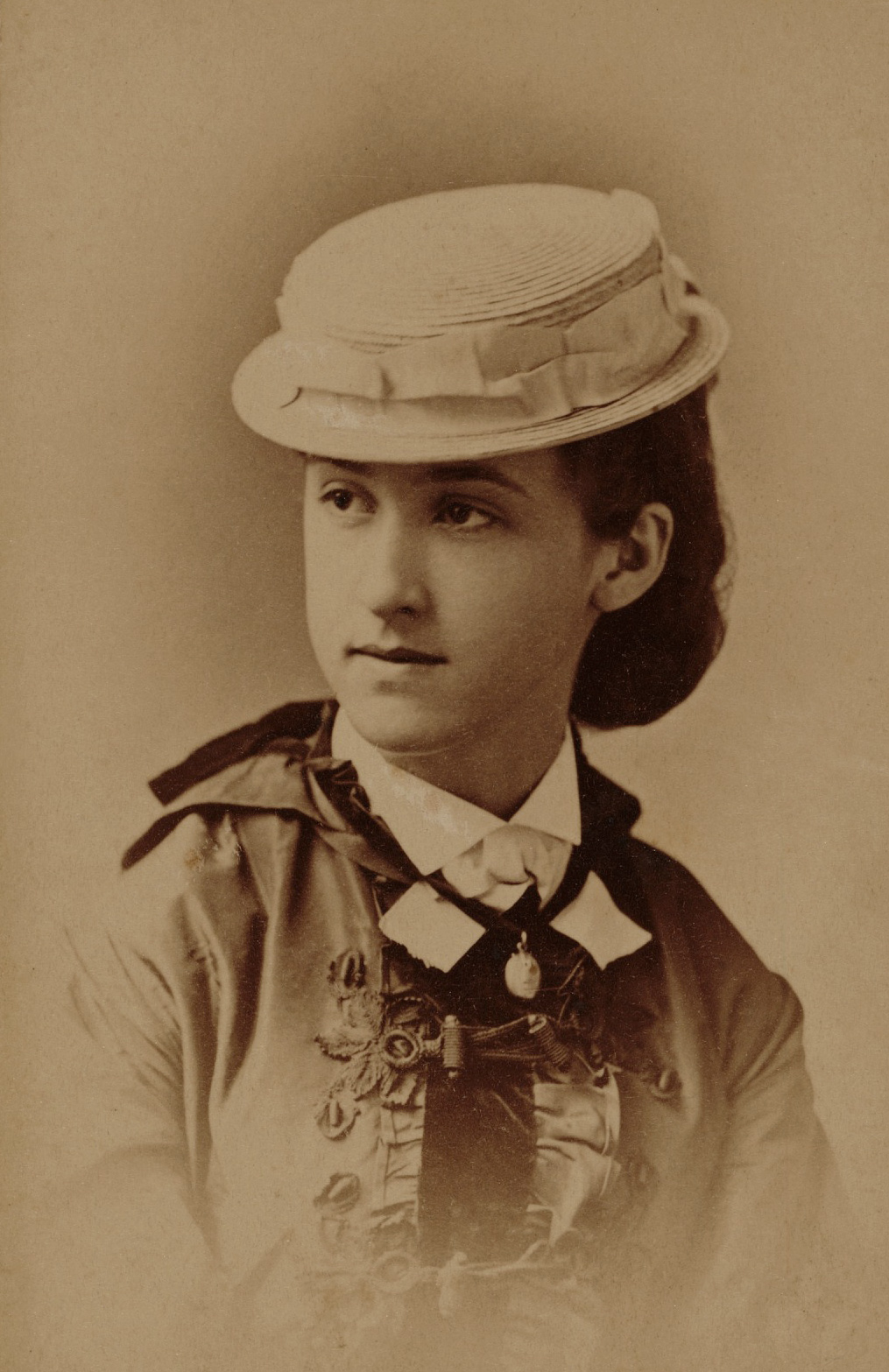
- Rosina Emmet Sherwood c. 1870
- Born: Rosina Emmet; December 13, 1854; New York City, New York
- Died: January 19, 1948 (aged 93)
- Known for: Painting, Portraiture
- Spouse: Arthur Sherwood (m. 1887)

Rosina Emmet Sherwood (13 December 1854 – 19 January 1948) was an American painter.

== Biography ==
Born in New York City on 13 December 1854, she was the daughter of William J. and illustrator and painter Julia Pierson Emmet; her surviving siblings were Robert Temple Emmet (1854–1936), her twin; William LeRoy Emmet (1858–1941); Devereux Emmet (1861–1934); Richard Stockton Emmet (b.1863); Lydia Field Emmet (1866–1952); Jane Emmet de Glehn (1873–1961); Christopher Temple Emmet (1868–1957); and Thomas Addis Emmet (b.1870). Her first cousin was the painter Ellen Emmet Rand.

Sherwood may have received her earliest training in art from her mother; a sketchbook dating to 1873 was in the hands of family members in 1987. Rosina traveled to Europe in 1876–1877, and was presented to Queen Victoria during the trip. Returning to New York, she and her friend Dora Wheeler began study with William Merritt Chase, and by 1881 she took studio space in the Tenth Street Studio Building. Among her earliest works were illustrations for publications such as Harper's Magazine, and in 1880 she won the $1,000 first prize in a competition to design a Christmas card for Louis Prang & Company. Sherwood and Wheeler worked together in the design firm Associated Artists, run by Candace Wheeler, Dora's mother; they designed tapestries, curtains, and wallpaper. Subjects included a variety drawn from American literature. In 1884–1885 the women attended classes at the Académie Julian in Paris; Sherwood's instructor there was Tony Robert-Fleury.

Rosina married, in 1887, Arthur Sherwood, and had five children with him, including future Pulitzer Prize winner Robert E. Sherwood. She continued working after her marriage, often looking to members of her family as her subjects.

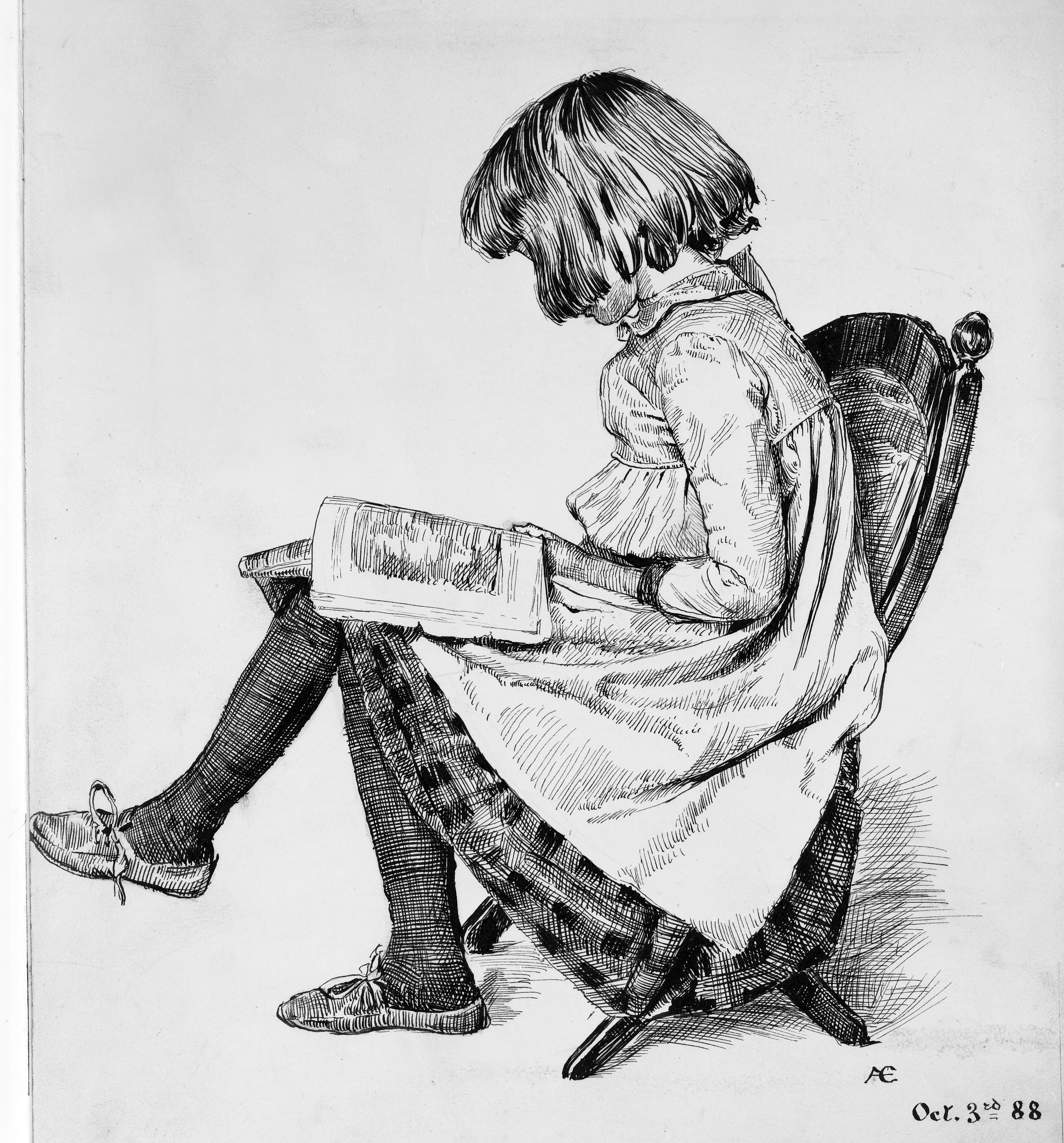
"Disgusted with life, she retired to the society of books", an illustration for a story by Elizabeth Eggleston Seelye in Harper's Young People, April 16, 1889

Elizabeth Eggleston Seelye's story "“The A.O.I.B.R." appeared in Harper's Bazaar in 1889 with Sherwood's illustration of a child reading. The Rockwell Centre for American Visual Studies cites this as a surprisingly early illustration of a girl reading. The subject of a female reading in this sketch is thought as rare (like the examples in Louisa Allcott's Little Women).

A portrait of Archer Huntington, husband of Anna Hyatt Huntington, dated to 1892, is currently owned by the Hispanic Society of America.

In 1893, Sherwood painted the mural The Republic's Welcome to Her Daughters for the Woman's Building of the 1893 World's Fair. Her work was also exhibited in the Palace of Fine Arts at the Fair

She accepted commissions once more in 1918 to provide support for her family, and continued painting watercolors for much of her career. One of these, 1922's San Pedro, Manila, was included in the inaugural exhibition of the National Museum of Women in the Arts, American Women Artists 1830–1930, in 1987.

A drawing by Sherwood is currently in the collection of the Smithsonian American Art Museum.
