= William Le Roy Emmet =

American electrical engineer (1859–1941)

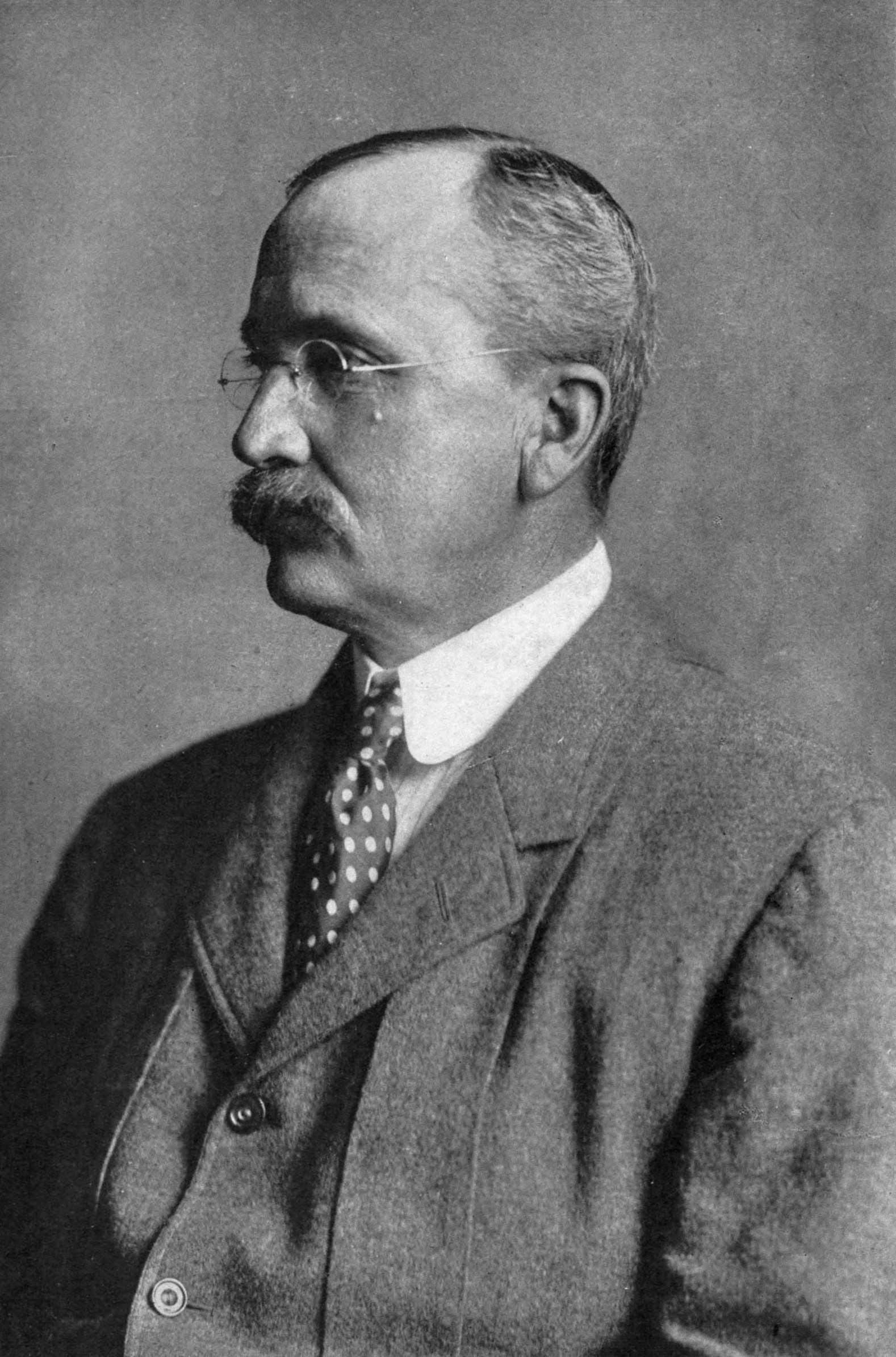
- Born: July 10, 1859; New Rochelle, New York
- Died: September 26, 1941 (aged 82)
- Education: U.S. Naval Academy
- Awards: IEEE Edison Medal (1919); Elliott Cresson Medal (1920)
- Scientific career
- Fields: Electrical engineering
- Workplaces: General Electric Company

William Le Roy Emmet (July 10, 1859 – September 26, 1941) was an electrical engineer who made major contributions to alternating current power systems including the design of large rotary converters.

== Biography ==
Coat of Arms of William Le Roy Emmet

Emmet was born in New Rochelle, New York to William Jenkins Emmet and Julia Colt Pierson. He is the great-grandson of Thomas Addis Emmet, a lawyer, who was an elder brother of executed Irish nationalist Robert Emmet. His father's parents were Robert Emmet and Rosina Hubley. His mother's parents were Josiah G. Pierson and Julia Colt.

His sisters included noted portrait artists Rosina Emmet Sherwood, Lydia Field Emmet and Jane Emmet de Glehn.

In addition his brothers included, C. Temple Emmet, an attorney and sportsman who was a graduate of the Yale Forest School Class of 1902; William LeRoy Emmet, a graduate of the United States Naval Academy, Class of 1881; Devereux Emmet, who became a prominent golf course architect; and Richard Stockton Emmet. His uncle, John Emmet, attended West Point from 1814 to 1817. His first cousin was portrait artist Ellen Emmet Rand.

He graduated from the United States Naval Academy in 1881. He joined the Edison General Electric Company in 1891. Three years later, after a merger, he became employee of General Electric Company (GE). Emmet was a leading advocate of the electrical propulsion of ships from turbines. His systems were first used in American ships during World War I. He also developed the mercury vapour turbine system for electric power production.

Emmet was elected to the American Philosophical Society in 1898. He received the AIEE Edison Medal in 1919 For inventions and developments of electrical apparatus and primo movers. He received the Elliott Cresson Medal of the Franklin Institute in 1920 and was elected to the National Academy of Sciences in 1921. Emmet worked at GE into his 70s and held 122 patents.

== Writing ==
Emmet's autobiography, Autobiography of an engineer, was published by Fort Orange Press in 1930 or 1931.

== Sources ==
- IEEE History Site William Le Roy Emmet
- Hall of History
