= McGregor Links =

NY golf club

McGregor Links Country Club
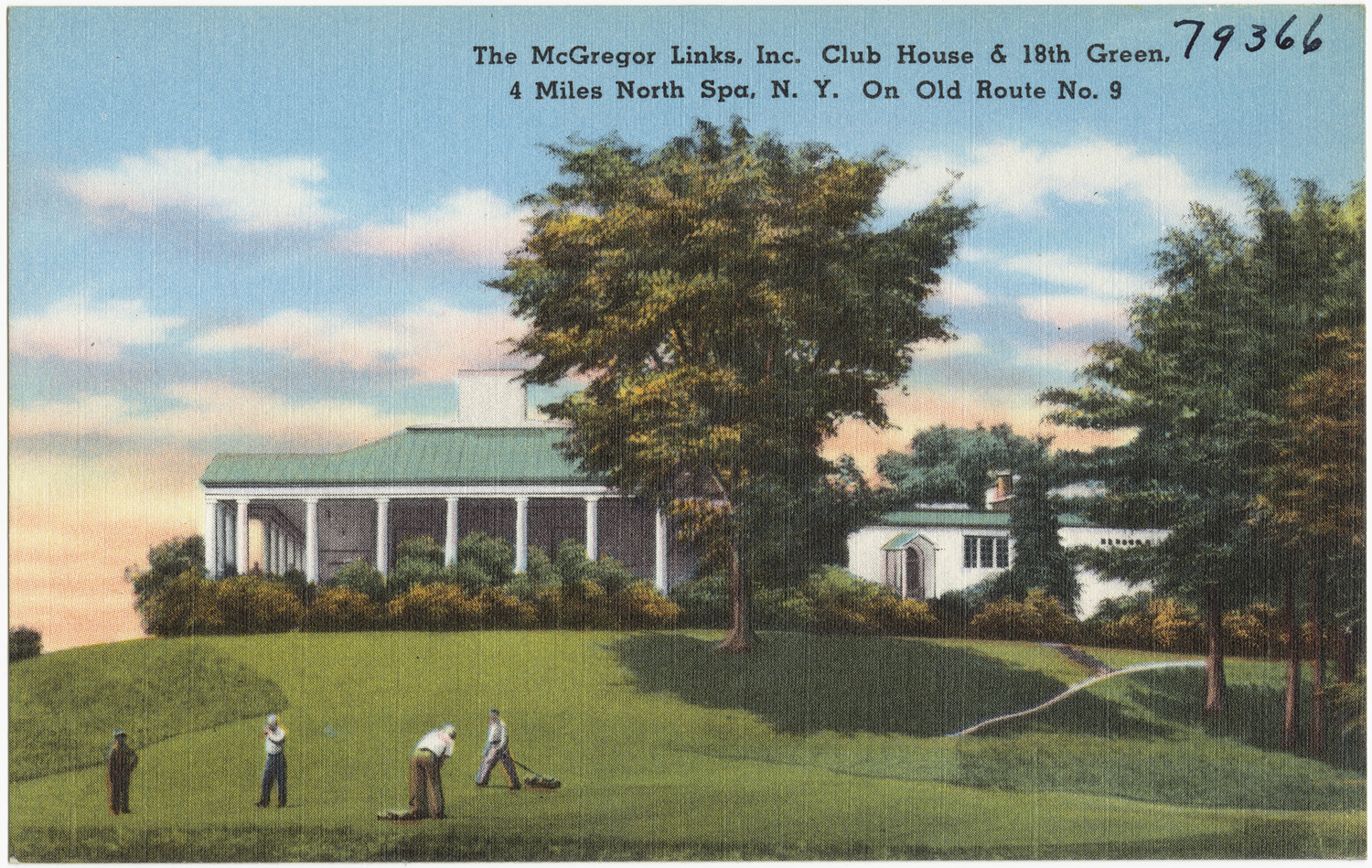
- McGregor Links clubhouse and 18th green in the 1930s
- Interactive map of McGregor Links Country Club
- 43°08′05″N 73°45′09″W

Club information
- Location: Wilton, New York, U.S.
- Established: 1921
- Type: Semi-Private
- Tota holes: 18

Gold Course
- Designed by: Devereux Emmet
- Par: 72
- Length: 6,629 yd (6,062 m)
- Course rating: 72.2
- Slope rating: 134

White Course
- Designed by: Devereux Emmet
- Par: 72
- Length: 6,349 yd (5,806 m)
- Course rating: 71
- Slope rating: 129

Red Course
- Designed by: Devereux Emmet
- Par: 75
- Length: 5,521 yd (5,048 m)
- Course rating: 72.2
- Slope rating: 128

Green Course
- Designed by: Devereux Emmet
- Par: 72
- Length: 5,521 yd (5,048 m)
- Course rating: 65.8
- Slope rating: 113

McGregor Links is a golf club located just outside Saratoga Springs, New York in the town of Wilton. As of 2015, McGregor is the fifth-largest course in the Capital District. The course is semi-private; it is open to the public every day but Tuesday and Thursday.

McGregor Links has been the site of seven New York State Amateur Golf Championships and two US Open local qualifiers. It is the home course of Skidmore College's golf team.

The course was built in 1921 by former state senator, businessman, and attorney Edgar T. Brackett. It was designed by Devereux Emmet, a prolific designer responsible for more than 150 courses, including the Blue course at the Congressional Country Club in Bethesda, Maryland. The clubhouse was designed by Alfred Hopkins. At the time of construction, Walter Hagen wrote that the course would be a rival to the Lido Golf Club, the National Links, and Pine Valley, known as the "Big Three". In 1923, Brackett sold the course to the McGregor Holding Corporation, chartered by Charles C. VanDeusen, Newman E. Wait, and Clarence Knapp.

In September 2025, under the ownership of Joe and Cindy Kehn, McGregor Links announced plans to transition from its semi-private status to operate as a fully private membership club beginning with the 2026 season. According to the club, while it will no longer be regularly open to the public, limited outside play will continue to be available during July and August at premium rates. Membership has expanded to more than 400, with further growth anticipated alongside planned facility upgrades.
