= Edwin D. Morgan (businessman) =

American businessman

- Born: Edwin Denison Morgan III; February 16, 1921
- Died: June 28, 2001 (aged 80); New York City, US
- Occupation: Businessman
- Known for: Director of the Pioneer Fund
- Parent(s): Edwin D. Morgan Jr. (1890-1954), Elizabeth Winthrop (Emmet) Morgan (1897-1934)
- Relatives: C. Temple Emmet (grandfather); John W. Chanler (great-grandfather); Edwin D. Morgan III (grandfather); Edwin D. Morgan (2x great-grandfather)

Edwin Denison Morgan III (February 16, 1921 – June 28, 2001) was an American businessman and Pioneer Fund director from 2000 to 2001.

== Early life ==
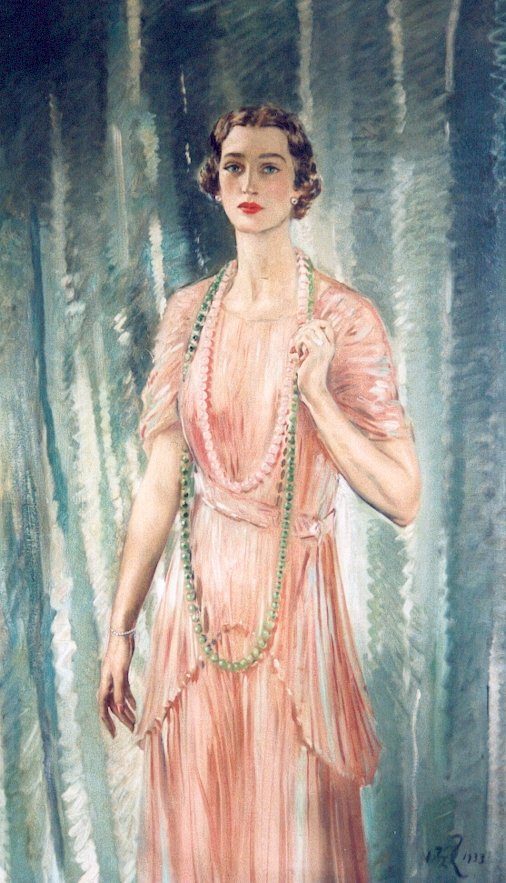
Portrait of Morgan's mother by William Bruce Ellis Ranken

Morgan was born on February 16, 1921, in New York City. His parents were Edwin D. Morgan Jr. (1890–1954) and Elizabeth Winthrop (née Emmet) Morgan (1897–1934). His younger brother was Temple Emmet Morgan (1922–2008), who became a monk at Saint Benedict Center in Harvard, Massachusetts. After his mother's death in February 1934, his father remarried to Fanny Taylor Baldwin Preston in July 1934.

His maternal grandparents were Christopher Temple Emmet and Alida Beekman (née Chanler) Emmet, the daughter of John Winthrop Chanler, a U.S. Representative from New York, and Margaret Astor (née Ward) Chanler of the prominent Astor family of New York. His paternal grandparents were Edwin Denison Morgan Sr., a noted yachtsman and horseman, and Elizabeth Sarah (née Archer) Morgan. Morgan's 2x-great grandfather was Edwin D. Morgan, who served as the 21st Governor of New York, a U.S. Senator, and was the longest-serving chairman of the Republican National Committee.

== Career ==
Immediately after the bombing of Pearl Harbor, Morgan enlisted in the Marine Corps and his 1st Marine Division participated in the Guadalcanal, New Guinea, New Britain and Peleliu battles in August 1942. Subsequently, he fought in the battles of eastern New Guinea, New Britain and Peleliu, rising to the rank of sergeant.

=== Post-war career ===
After the war, he briefly worked for the New York Herald Tribune in New York and the Marshall Plan in Europe. He did not attend college, however, he became an authority on the military and political history of the battle of Guadalcanal.

In 1954, while living in Paris, Morgan founded of Overseas Credit, Inc., which financed cars across Europe for U.S. military personnel and Marshall Plan employees. From this, he became a friend and adviser to many American writers and editors who gravitated to Paris. He was a well-known figure in the expatriate American literary community in Paris in the 1950s and 1960s, allowing Peter Matthiessen, Harold Humes, and George Plimpton to run The Paris Review, a literary magazine founded in 1953, at his company office. He was a friend of writers James Jones, James Baldwin, William Styron, Irwin Shaw and William Saroyan.

Morgan later founded Holographics, Inc., which developed useful laser technologies.

== Personal life ==
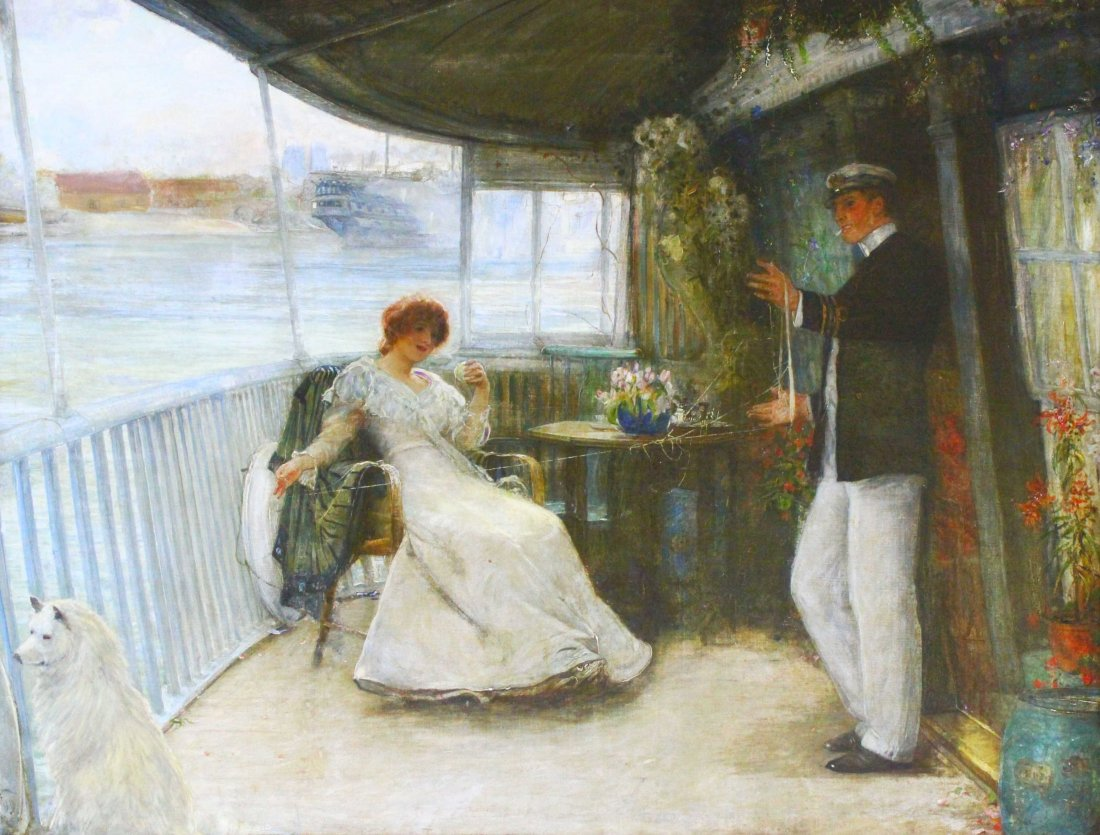
Morgan's father and mother on an open-air 'veranda' on the stern of their steam yacht May, 1899

In 1949, Morgan married Nancy Marie Whitney (1926–2006), the daughter of Cornelius Vanderbilt Whitney and Marie Norton Harriman (the second wife of New York governor W. Averell Harriman). Before their divorce, Edwin and Nancy were the parents of two children: Alida Morgan and Pamela Morgan.

After their divorce, Nancy married Charles Russell Hurd on August 26, 1957. Within a year, she was divorced from Hurd and married to his older brother, Edward Augustus Hurd Jr., on July 1, 1958. She later married well known water colorist Pierre Lutz. Morgan later married Jacqueline (née Jesseris) Johnson, the former wife of Murdock Porter Johnson Jr., which also ended in divorce.

Morgan died of cancer on June 28, 2001, in New York City.
