= Pelham Country Club =

Country club in Pelham Manor, New York

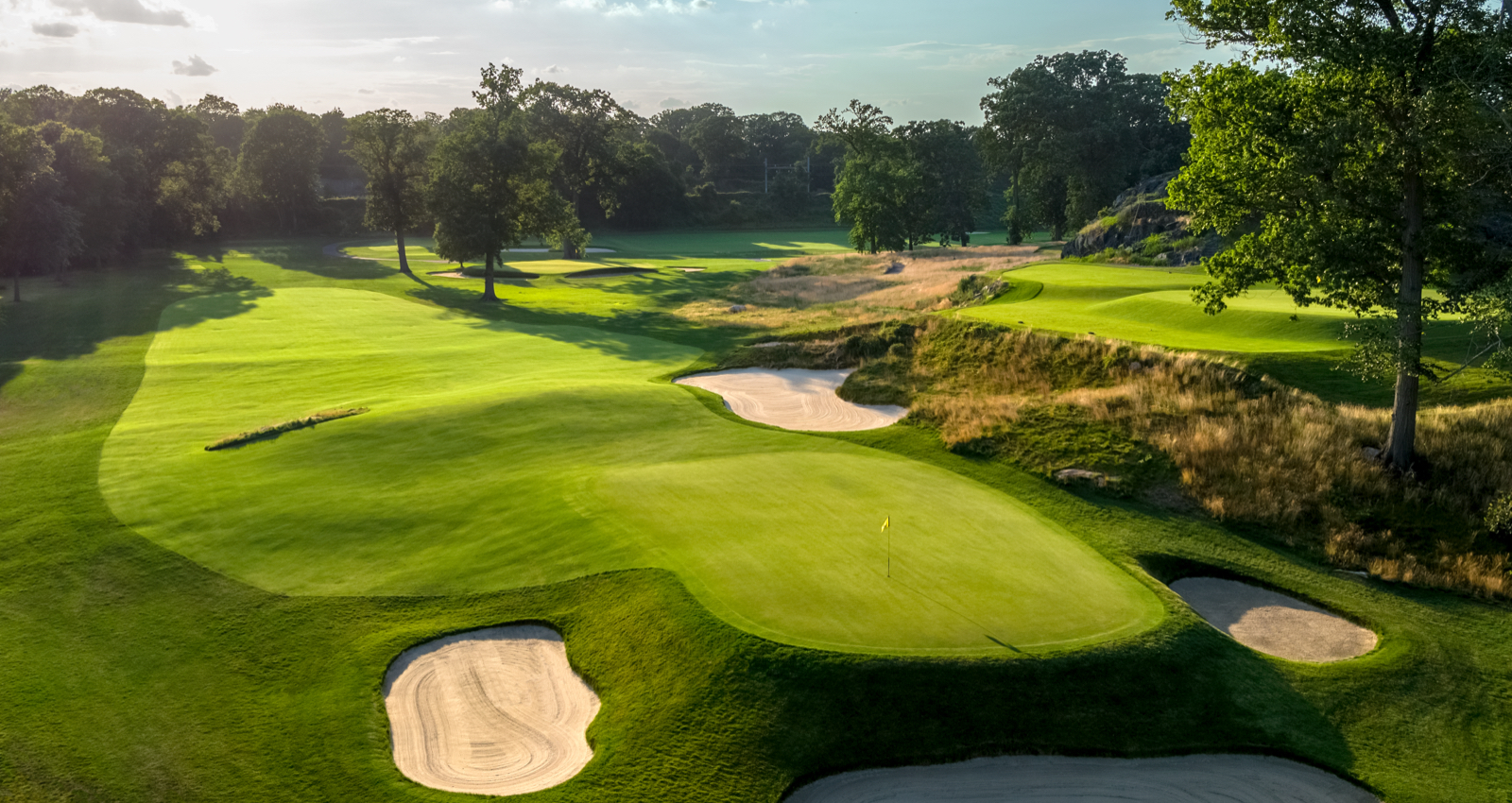
- The 273 yard par 4 4th

- Location within the United States Location within New York
- 40°53′43″N 73°48′03″W

Club information
- Location: Pelham Manor, New York
- Established: 1921
- Type: Private
- Tota holes: 18
- Tournaments: PGA Championship (1923)
- Website: www.pelhamcc.com
- Designed by: Devereux Emmet
- Par: 71
- Length: 6,563 yards
- Course rating: 71.4
- Slope rating: 133

Pelham Country Club is a country club located in Pelham Manor in Westchester County, New York. The club hosted the PGA Championship in 1923, in which Gene Sarazen defeated Walter Hagen after 38 holes of play.

== History ==
In 1900, Dr. Charles Ripley Gillett and his brother bought clubs and balls, planted cans in the ground of a cow pasture and proceeded to teach themselves the game of golf, which had recently been introduced into the United States from Scotland. Soon after, the first Pelham Country Club was formed. This club laid out a nine-hole course on the rolling meadows known as the 'Carson Place'. Dr. Edward P. Fowler of New York City bought the Carson place as a summer home. He lived in the farmhouse and rented the grounds to the Pelham Country Club for a golf course.

After some time Dr. Fowler decided to divide his property and the club had to look for a new home. The members explored the possibilities of the Disbrow Farm located far out in the rural northern end of New Rochelle. It comprised 180 acres of level land, which had been under cultivation for several years. After much discussion, the Pelham Country Club made the move to what would then be called the 'Wykagyl Golf Club'.

A few years later Mr. George Phelps started another Pelham Country Club. In 1908 the members decided to expand their club quarters and in 1919 it was decided to convert the Country Club into a Golf Club. Devereux Emmet a noted golf architect from Pelham, NY, was commissioned to lay out the 18-hole course. Construction was started in 1920, and the course was ready by July 1921.

The official opening of the golf course was on July 11–12, 1921, when the British Open Golf Champion Jock Hutchison, and the English golf stars Abe Mitchell and George Duncan played the course with an immense gallery following them. In September 1923, the PGA Championship was played at Pelham Country Club with golf's most prominent players participating. Gene Sarazen and Walter Hagen stole the show, when they finished even-up in the 3-hold final, and went on to extra holes.

== Scorecard ==
Pelham Country Club
Tee	Rating/Slope	1	2	3	4	5	6	7	8	9	Out	10	11	12	13	14	15	16	17	18	In	Total
Black	M:71.4 / 133	420	219	605	273	514	362	184	430	322	3,329	153	400	411	520	402	157	588	428	175	3,234	6,563
Blue	M:70.5 / 131	407	210	570	273	514	330	184	430	322	3,240	153	400	388	508	402	143	558	405	175	3,130	6,370
White	M:69.0 / 129 W:74.5 / 134	400	202	550	268	495	306	169	389	308	3,087	142	385	355	500	387	133	472	375	165	2,914	6,001
Green	M:65.7 / 118 W:70.7 / 128	375	197	475	212	438	292	152	289	252	2,682	88	380	268	460	267	122	435	335	107	2,462	5,144
Par		4	3	5	4	5	4	3	4	4	36	3	4	4	5	4	3	5	4	3	35	71
SI	Men's	7	9	1	11	3	13	17	5	15		16	12	10	2	6	18	8	4	14
SI	Women's	7	9	1	13	3	11	17	5	15		10	6	8	4	16	14	2	12	18
