= Rye Golf Club (Rye, New York) =

Coordinates: 40°57′30″N 73°42′0″W

- U.S. Historic district – Contributing property
- U.S. National Historic Landmark District – Contributing property
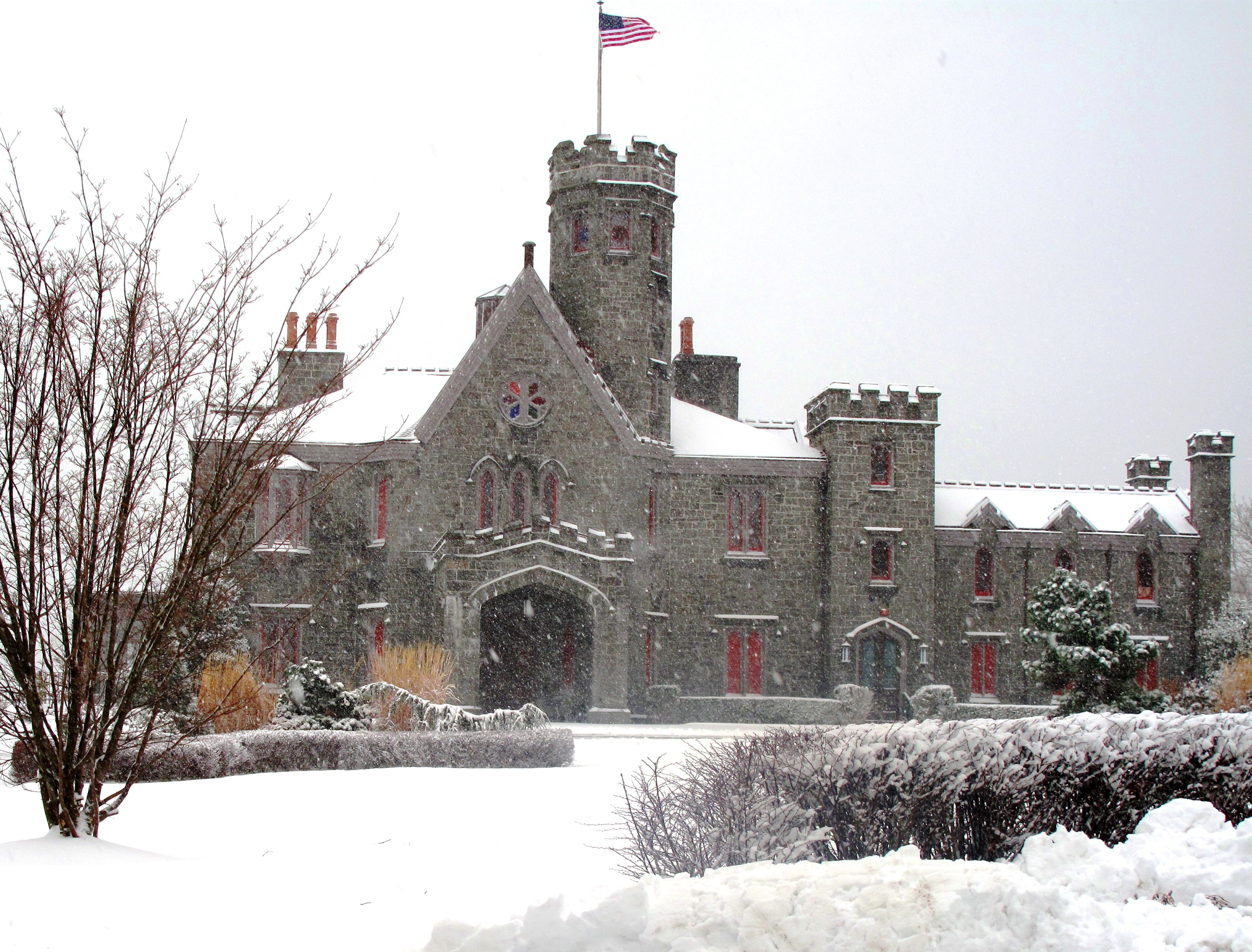
- Location: 330 Boston Post Road, Rye, New York
- Built: 1852; 1921
- Architects: Alexander Jackson Davis; Devereux Emmet
- Architectural style: Gothic Revival architecture
- Restored by: City of Rye
- Website: www.ryegolfclub.com
- Part of: Boston Post Road Historic District (Rye, New York) (ID82001275)

Significant dates
- Added to NRHP: October 29, 1982
- Designated NHLDCP: August 30, 1993

The Rye Golf Club is a municipally owned country club in Rye, New York, and one of five constituent properties of the National Historic Landmark Boston Post Road Historic District. The centerpiece of the parcel is an 1854 Gothic Revival stone home known as Whitby Castle which was designed by American architect Alexander Jackson Davis. The club has an 18-hole golf course designed by Devereux Emmet and 2 swimming pools.

== Clubhouse "Whitby Castle" ==
The stone building which functions as the facility's clubhouse and houses a restaurant was originally intended as a residence for the Chapman family. It was constructed between 1852 and 1854. It was modeled on Whitby Abbey in England and is known as Whitby Castle.

== History ==
The land currently occupied by the Rye Golf Club was originally purchased by the Chapman family of New York in the 1800s and used as a private residence. It was subsequently sold to the family of Joseph Park before being sold in 1921. Numerous entities have managed the property as a country club since then and have given it more than six different names. While the club has had periods of success, it has also endured many challenges, emerging from bankruptcy and surviving the threat of dissolution and development. Over 100 years, the key components of the club have remained the same: the main clubhouse, the golf course, and a large swimming pool.

=== Rye Country Club (1921) ===
The Rye Golf Club was originally organized on July 1, 1921, as the Rye Country Club by a group of men from Rye and other Westchester towns with the intention of attracting an initial membership of 600. The club was built on 150 acres of the former George Park and William Porter Allen estates overlooking Long Island Sound. Activities proposed for the club included summer sports of golf; swimming; beach bathing with the creation of a new sandy expanse; and winter sports of ice skating and hockey. Four clay tennis courts and four grass lawn courts were also part of the original plan. The architect F. Burnham Chapman was retained to design additions for ballroom space, lockers, and a grill room. Organizers of the club envisioned bus service from the Rye and Harrison train stations to regularly transport the club's members and guests. Devereux Emmet was selected to design the course.

Construction on the golf course moved slowly with some initial overall club projects like the lawn tennis courts and harborage for yachts deferred.

William H. Horne, a renowned long driving golfer from England, was hired as the club's first pro in 1922. Horne was followed by golf pro Martin Sykes in 1925.

In its early days, the Rye links drew famous people like Yankee great Babe Ruth in 1933 and amateur golf champion George Von Elm. Duncan Barr was the club's golf pro at this time. Ruth and Elm were among those celebrities to play the course during this first iteration. Other celebrities to hit the greens included golfers Ed "Porky" Oliver and Gene Sarazen who played an exhibition match there in the summer of 1940 as part of a 60-day tour sponsored by Golf Magazine.

Despite the growth in popularity of the sport, the Depression took its toll on the club and by November 1936, its principals were facing bankruptcy.

The club was transferred to the Bowery Savings Bank sometime around 1941.

=== Rye Sound Public Country Club (1943) ===
The reorganized club opened on April 3, 1943, as the Rye Sound Public Country Club. Advertisements highlighted golf but also additional amenities like two salt water swimming pools, one for kids and one for adults, filled with filtered water from Long Island Sound. The club offered four hard surface tennis courts.

=== Bayview Country Club (1944) ===
During World War II, the club took on another name, the Bayview Country Club During this transition time William H. Horne continued to manage the golf operations. It was dissolved by 1945.

=== Rye Soundview Country Club (1945) ===
The waterfront location of the club captured the attention of builders. A syndicate acquired the land in August 1945 with the intention of erecting large homes. But reorganization as a golf club prevailed and led by the owners of Buddy Lee Clothes and William Horne, the club's first pro, the facility, was rebranded under the name Rye Soundview Country Club. This name for the club was used only a short time.

=== Glen Castle Country Club (1946) ===
The club was renamed, and the pool and tennis courts renovated. Pat Tiso became the new club's golf professional following Duncan Barr who had previously been the pro.

=== Ryewood Country Club (1949) ===
Sometime around 1949, the club's name had changed yet again. It was a popular venue for dances and luncheons and served the community beyond Rye. Organizations from Scarsdale, Mamaroneck, and Larchmont, like the Sisterhood of Larchmont Temple, held gatherings there.

By 1959, the club's Board of Governors represented residents throughout Westchester including New Rochelle, Mount Vernon, and Port Chester. The pro up to this period was Fred Annon (1951-1959). Annon was succeeded by 1952 National PGA Champion "Whistling Jim" Turnesa who was hired in 1959 with a January 1, 1960 start date. Turnesa was one of the famous "Golfing Brothers" dynasty of Elmsford.

=== Rye Golf Club (1965) ===
The City of Rye had their eye on acquiring the Rye Wood Country Club for many years and assembled a planning committee to study the possibility and its ramifications for the community. The proposal, the goal of which was to expand public access to recreation, was a topic of great debate and political discussion for many years starting as early as 1961. In 1964, with the possibility of losing the property to Westchester County looming, the City of Rye put the acquisition of the club to a vote by taxpayers who voted 6-1 for the city to purchase the club solely for the use of people living in Rye. The City tried condemnation proceedings to take over the club but was defeated in court. An initial offer of $1.1 million was refused by owners of the club as too low a price. The City returned with an offer of $1.7 million which was accepted. The city took possession of the club and its grounds in the spring of 1965.

Today the club occupies 126 acres (51 ha) overlooking Milton Harbor. Though the original purpose for the city's acquisition of the property was for the exclusive use of its citizens, one no longer needs to be a Rye taxpayer to qualify for membership in the club and there is a separate non-resident category.

== Swimming pool ==
Every version of the country club since 1921 has had one or two swimming pools though the location of the pools has changed from time to time. At the time the main pool was constructed, it was reported to be the largest of its kind in all of Westchester County at 120 by 60 feet. The swimming pool remained a focal point of the club's operations through 1950 when the owners faced water shortages. A new way to fill it with saltwater was solved by digging a 1,700 foot (0.52 km) pipeline from Long Island Sound to pump water in.

In 1965, the two original pools were replaced by one larger pool measuring 165 by 75 feet.

Though the two sports are not reflected in the club's name, swimming and diving are activities that members have excelled at in competitions throughout Westchester County.

== Controversies ==
In 2013, it was discovered that the general manager of Rye Golf Club, Scott Yandrasevich, had been embezzling money from the Club and defrauded the City of Rye. An investigation and lawsuit ensued and Yandrasevich was convicted and sent to prison.

In January 2013, the Club's Commission employed James Lopolito as the acting General Manager on a one-year contract. The expectations were for Lopolito to end the extensive losses the club had encountered over the previous five years. Lopolito realized early on that there were many areas for improvement and implemented an upside-down budgeting process, although the Commission did not fully understand it at first. One of the significant findings by Lopolito was a water main broken on the course that had gone unnoticed for over two years, costing the Club approximately $60,000 per year. By the end of Lopolito's one-year term, he had made significant progress, and the Club realized a $400,000 profit that year.

The City of Rye was sued by several club members in 2017 over alleged negligence in the handling of application of pesticides to the greens which resulted in the golf course being closed to members in 2015.

Additional lawsuits related to staff have continued to plague the club.

The most recent controversy surfaced in 2021 as neighbors and Rye residents questioned plans for tree removal.
