= The Mallows =

Historic house in New York, United States

- U.S. National Register of Historic Places
- Location within New York Location within the United States
- Location: Emmet Way, Head of the Harbor, New York
- Coordinates: 40°54′59″N 73°9′7″W
- Area: 4.1 acres (1.7 ha)
- Built: 1906
- Architect: Platt, Charles A.
- Architectural style: Colonial Revival
- MPS: Stony Brook Harbor Estates MPS
- NRHP reference No.: 93000703
- Added to NRHP: August 9, 1993

The Mallows, also known as Alida Chanler Emmet and Christopher Temple Emmet Estate, is a historic home located at Head of the Harbor, New York, United States. It is a Colonial Revival estate home designed in 1906 by architect Charles A. Platt (1861–1933). It is an imposing structure, finished in stucco with powerful wooden detailing at the principal doorways, roof cornice and porch. It is a large rectangular mass, two full stories in height, seven bays long, with projecting wings. It features a simple pitched gable roof and a two-story porch on the west wing with large Doric order piers.

It was added to the National Register of Historic Places in 1993.
