= Wilfrid de Glehn =

English painter

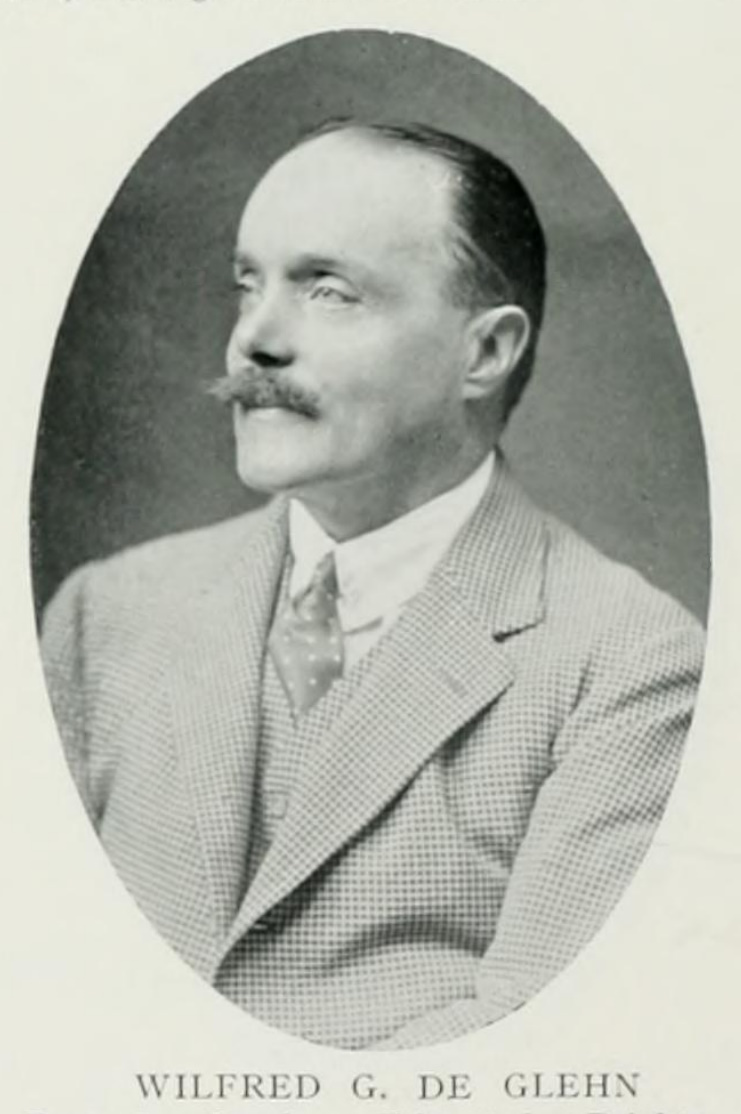
- Glehn in 1922
- Born: Wilfried von Glehn; 1870; London, England, British Empire
- Died: 11 May 1951 (aged 80–81); Stratford Tony, Wiltshire, United Kingdom
- Spouse: Jane Emmet (m. 1904)
- Military career
- Allegiance: British Empire
- Service years: 1916–1917
- Other work: Artist, painter

Wilfrid Gabriel de Glehn (sometimes 'Wilfried') RA (1870 – 11 May 1951) was a British Impressionist painter, elected to the Royal Academy in 1932.

== Biography ==
De Glehn's father was Alexander de Glenn of Sydenham, London, himself the son of Robert von Glehn, a Baltic baron with estates near Tallinn in Estonia, who had become a naturalised British subject following his marriage to a Scottish woman. Wilfrid's mother was French. Louise Creighton, a women's rights activist and author, and Alfred de Glehn, a French steam locomotive designer, were Alexander's sister and brother.

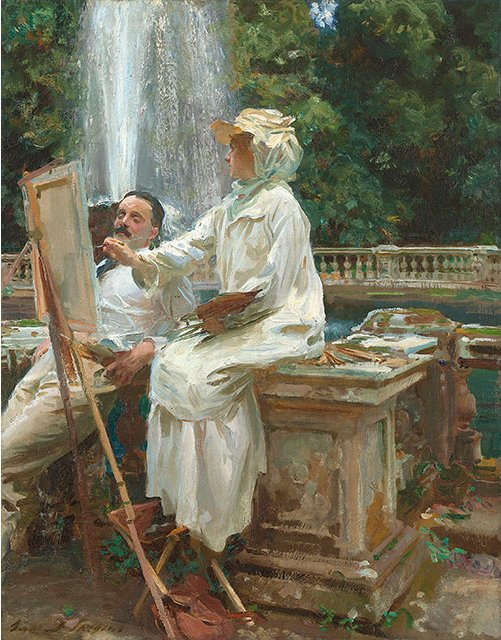
Wilfrid and Jane de Glehn, depicted by John Singer Sargent at the Villa Torlonia, Frascati (1907)

Wilfried von Glehn (he changed his name in May 1917) was born in Sydenham, south-east London. After schooling at Brighton College with his brother Louis, he studied art briefly at the Royal Academy Schools in South Kensington before going on to the École des Beaux-Arts in Paris, where for a time he lived with his French cousin, the artist Lucien Monod (1867–1957). In 1891, he was hired by Edwin Austin Abbey and John Singer Sargent to assist them on their Boston Public Library mural project at Morgan Hall.

De Glehn exhibited his own work first in Rome in 1894 and then in Paris in 1895; he was also elected an Associetaire of the Société des Artistes Français. He first exhibited at the Royal Academy in 1896.

De Glehn met American-born artist Jane Erin Emmet in New Rochelle, New York in 1903, and they were married there the following year. Following their wedding, the couple honeymooned in Cornwall, England, vacationed in Paris and Venice, and made a permanent home in Chelsea, London. However, they travelled extensively, often accompanying Sargent on his trips through Europe. When World War 1 intervened, husband and wife joined the staff of a British hospital for French soldiers, Hôpital Temporaire d'Arc-en-Barrois, Haute-Marne, France in January 1915, working for the Franco-British Red Cross. The following year, de Glehn was commissioned and served with the Royal Garrison Artillery. He was seconded to the front in Italy in 1917. In May 1917, his family shed the Germanic 'von Glehn' surname. Because of his fluent French, he spent the last part of the war as an interpreter. After the war, de Glehn held solo exhibitions at the Leicester Galleries and in New York (1920). For the next decade the couple would spend summers in Cornwall and winters in France.

Although some experts rank de Glehn alongside Sargent, he is considered as something of a late British Renoir, for his deft use of sunlight and shadow.

He died on 11 May 1951, at the age of 80, at his home, the Manor House in Stratford Tony, Wiltshire, to which he had moved in 1942 after the Chelsea house had been destroyed in the Blitz. His home was the subject of several paintings, as was the Old Rectory in Wilton, which he had previously rented.

His portrait of the cellist Florence Hooton from 1936 hangs in the Duke's Hall, Royal Academy of Music. An oil painting of Venice featured on the BBC's Antiques Roadshow in December 2014 and was valued at £20–30,000.

== Gallery ==
A selection of paintings by Wilfrid de Glehn.
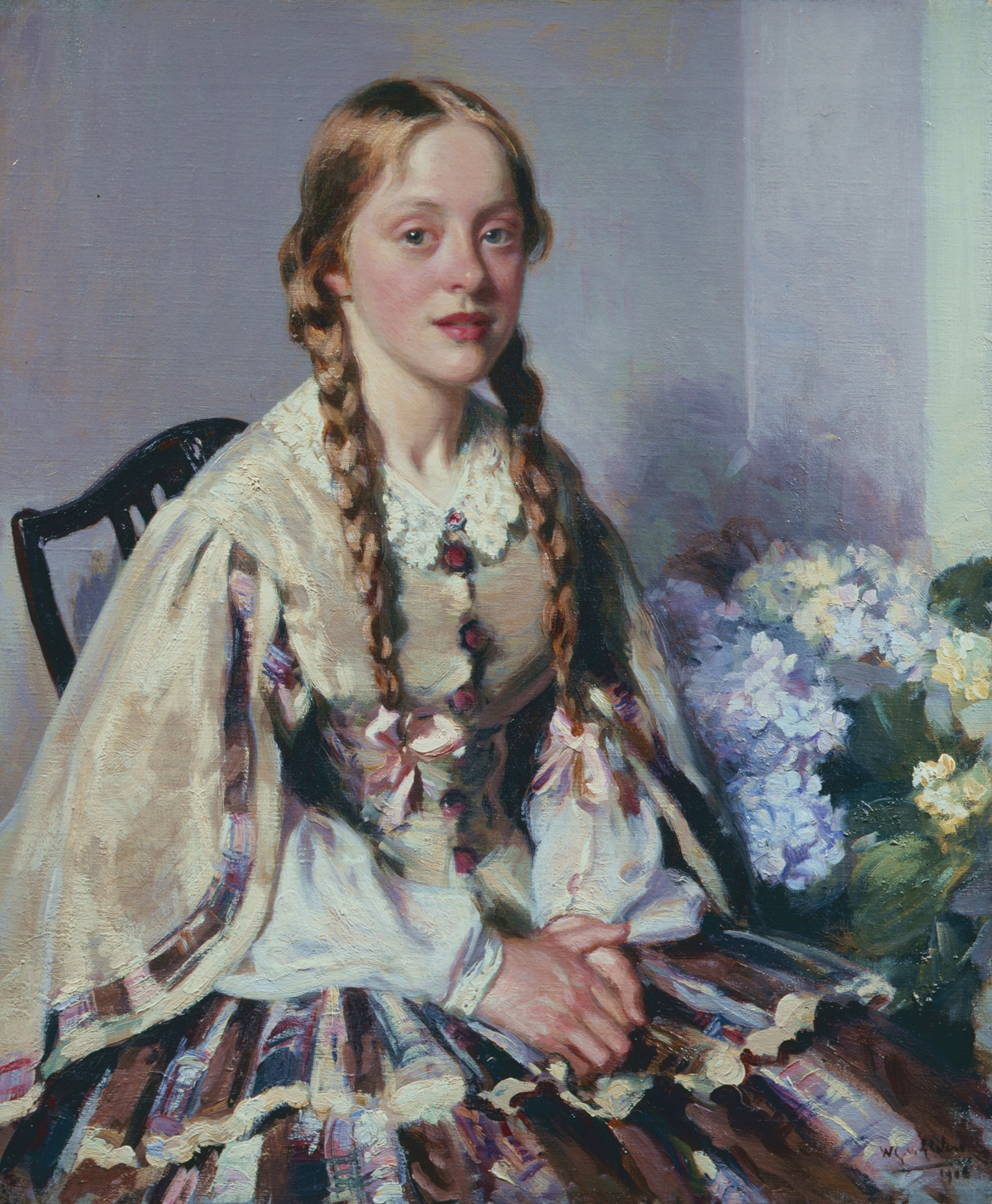
Blue Hydrangeas (1906).

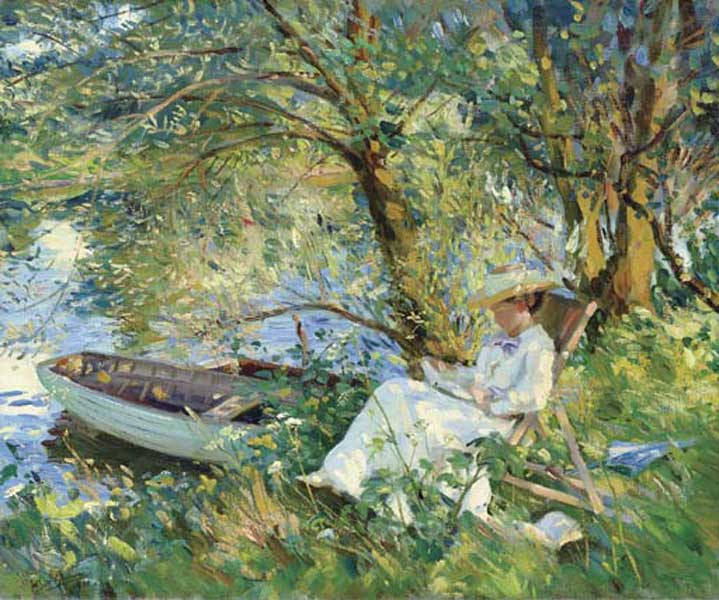
Under the Willows (1910).

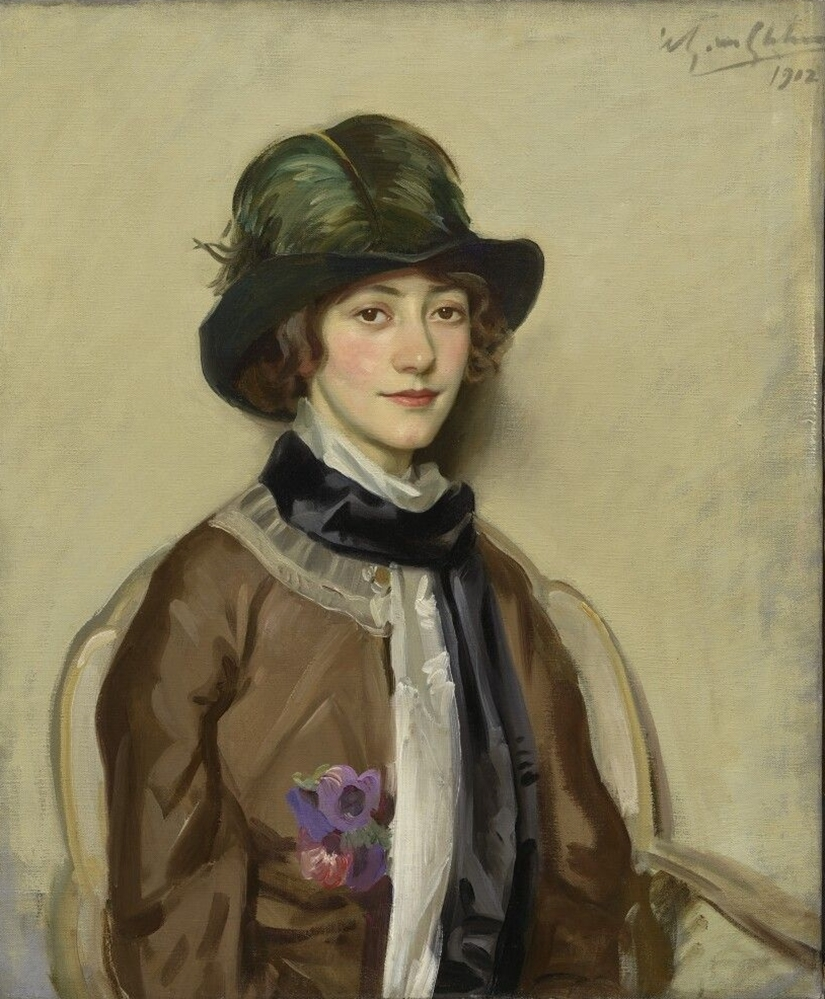
Lynn Fontanne (1912).

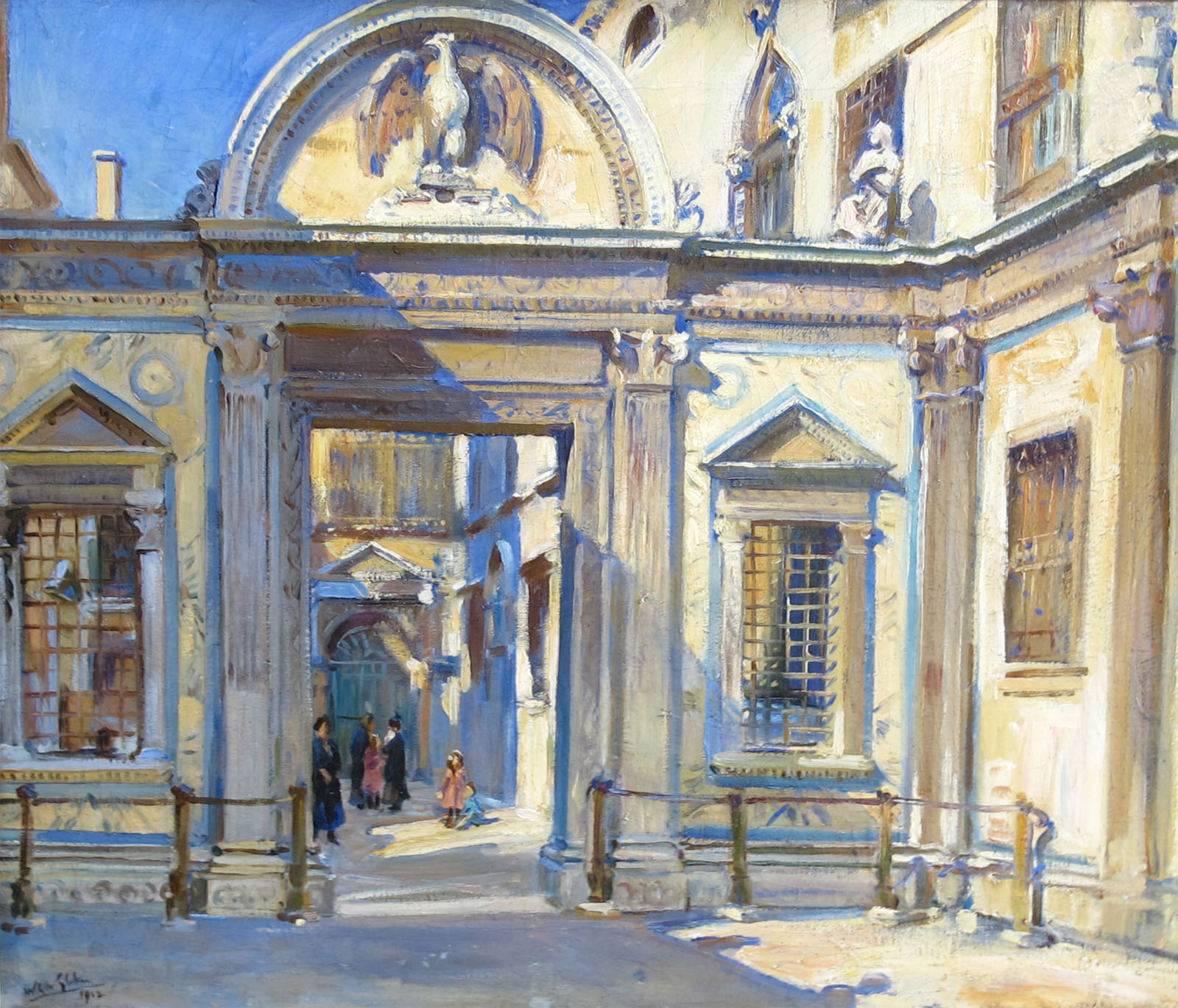
A Venetian Doorway (1913).

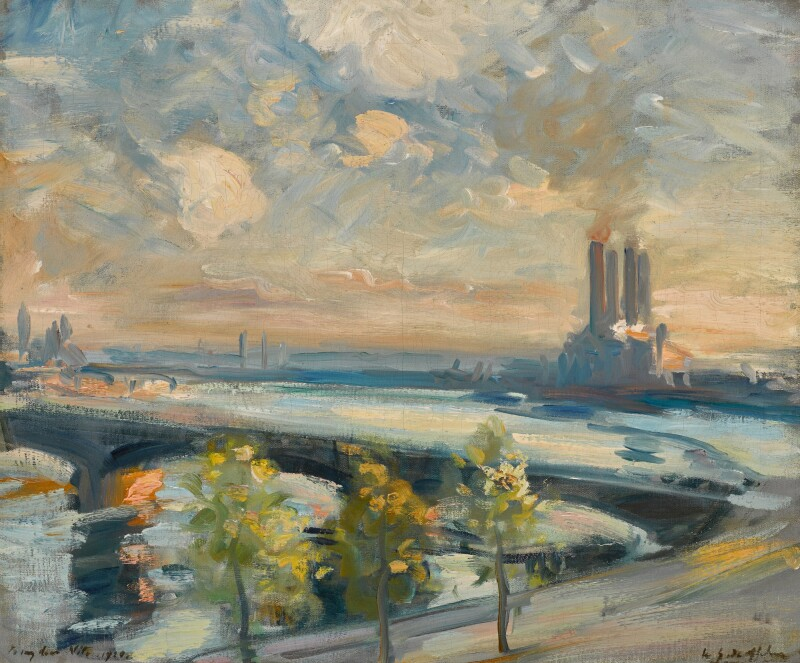
Sunlit, Battersea Park (1920).

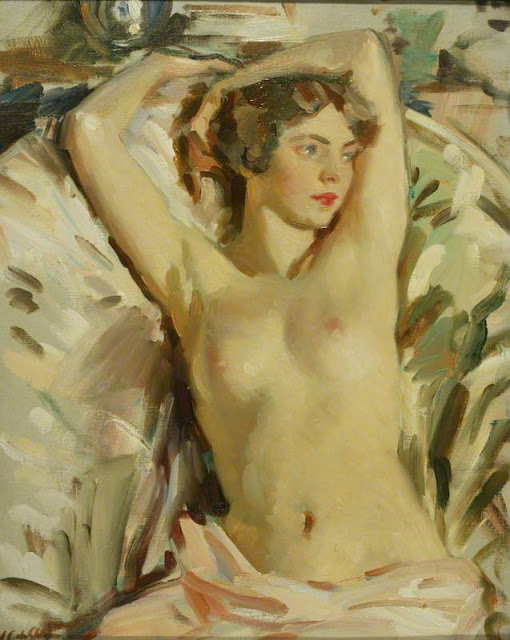
Nude Study (1929), oil on canvas, Manchester Art Gallery.

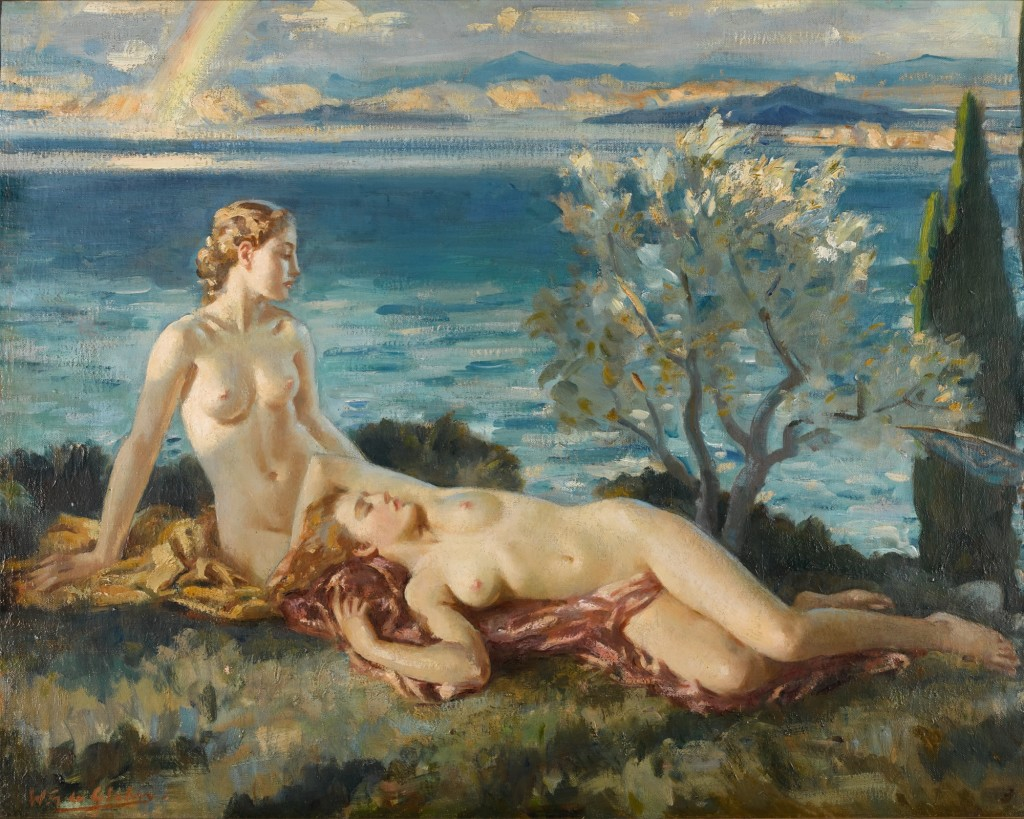
The Rainbow (1938).
