= Ellen Emmet Rand =

American painter

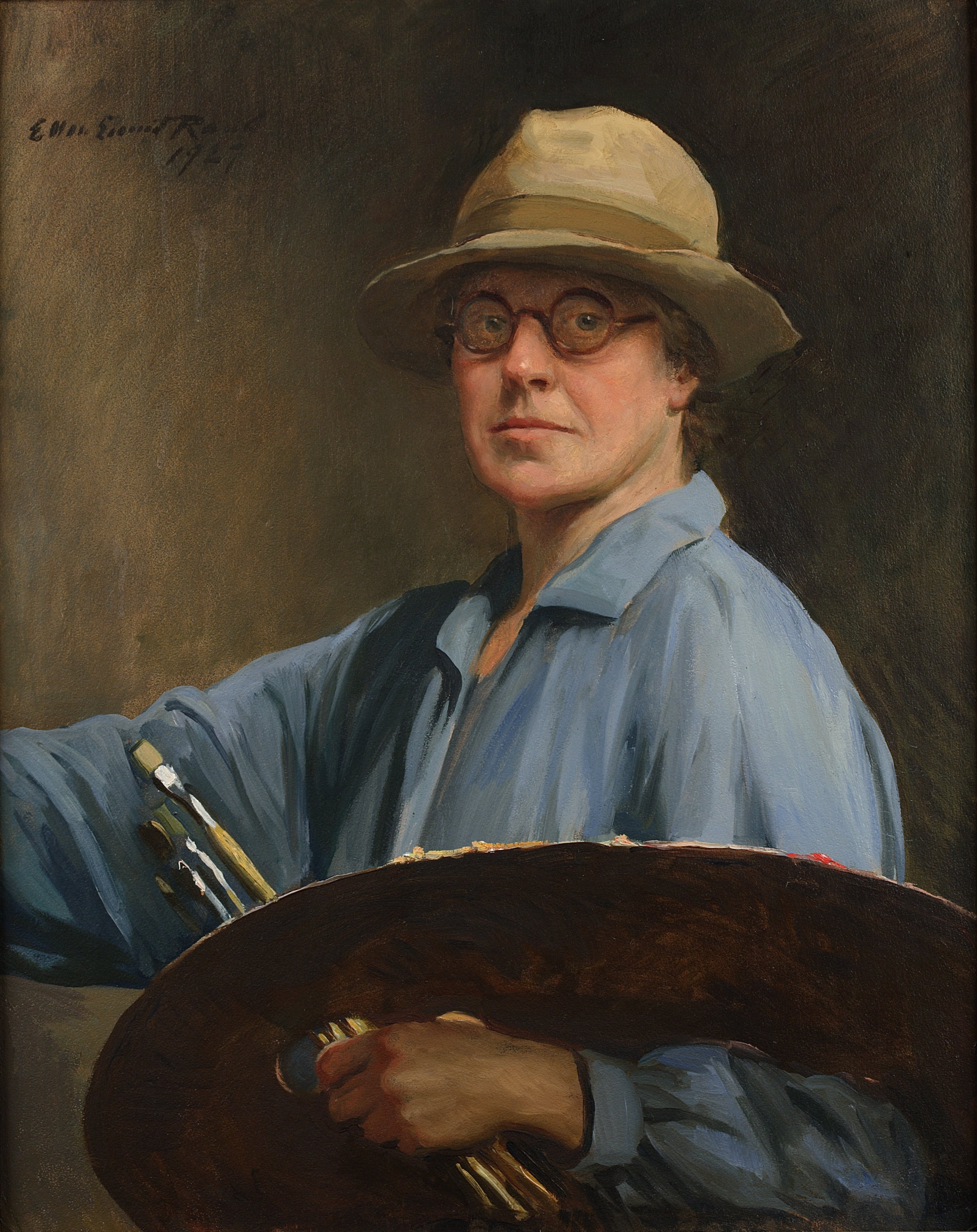
- Self-Portrait, 1927
- Born: Ellen Gertrude Emmet; March 4, 1875; San Francisco, California, U.S.
- Died: December 18, 1941 (aged 66); New York, New York, U.S.
- Other names: Ellen Gertrude "Bay" Emmet
- Known for: Painting
- Spouse: William Blanchard Rand (m. 1911)

Ellen Emmet Rand (née Ellen Gertrude Emmet; March 4, 1875 – December 18, 1941) was a painter and illustrator. She specialized in portraits, painting over 500 works during her career including portraits of President Franklin D. Roosevelt, artist Augustus Saint-Gaudens, and her cousins Henry James and William James. Rand studied at the Cowles Art School in Boston and the Art Students League in New York City and produced illustrations for Vogue Magazine and Harper's Weekly before traveling to England and then France to study with sculptor Frederick William MacMonnies. The William Benton Museum of Art at the University of Connecticut owns the largest collection of her painted works and the University of Connecticut, as well as the Archives of American Art within the Smithsonian Institution both have collections of her papers, photographs, and drawings.

== Early life and family ==
Ellen Gertrude Emmet was the third of six children born to Ellen James Temple Emmet and Christopher Temple Emmet. She was called "Bay". Ellen was born in San Francisco but moved to New York after her father's death in 1884. Her cousins were painters Lydia Field Emmet (1866–1952), Rosina Emmet Sherwood (1854–1948), and Jane Emmet de Glehn (1873–1961) and the writers Henry James (1843–1916) and William James (1842–1910). She married William Blanchard Rand in 1911 and had three sons. Rand's primary studio was in New York City but she would also work in Salisbury, Connecticut where her family lived.

== Career ==
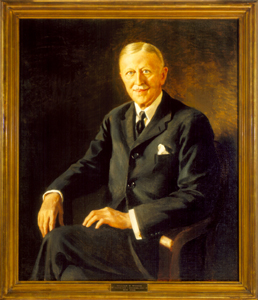
Secretary of the Treasury William H. Woodin (1934), Department of the Treasury

Rand studied with Dennis Miller Bunker and attended the Cowles Art School in Boston and then from 1889 to 1893 registered for classes at the Art Students League of New York. Rand then attended the William Merritt Chase's Shinnecock Hills Summer School of Art. Harry McVickar, editor of Vogue magazine, saw her work in an exhibit for the summer school and asked her to illustrate for the magazine. She also illustrated for Harper's Weekly and Harper's Bazaar. In 1896 Rand travelled to England. She returned to the US in 1898 and then to Paris to study with MacMonnies. Also in France and studying with MacMonnies was fellow American artist Mary Foote. Rand returned to New York City in 1900 and began her painting career in earnest.

Rand focused her energy and output on painting portraits of corporate directors, society women, politicians, scientists, professors, lawyers and artists in the United States. Her portraits of the singer Susan Metcalfe Casals, her husband celloist Pablo Casals, and opera singer Charles Gilibert, as well as her portraits of sculptor Saint-Gaudens and MacMonnies, all attest to her engagement with the arts in the first decade of the twentieth century. In terms of politicians she claimed to have started a work on a portrait of President Theodore Roosevelt but she "had to give it up. 'It was ridiculous,' she recalled. 'He couldn't sit still—especially with children going in and out of the studio with snakes and spiders.'" Rand did, however, complete three portraits of President Franklin Roosevelt, including his official presidential portrait. She was the second female artist commissioned to produce a presidential portrait. After his death, the portrait was moved to the Roosevelt estate and future FDR Library in Hyde Park, NY. It is unclear exactly why such a move was made, although there are letters exchanged between President Harry Truman and First Lady Eleanor Roosevelt concerning the transfer of the portrait. Another portrait was then used to replace the Rand work in the White House. In 2004 the portrait was reported missing from the Library. Rand also painted three U.S. Secretaries of State—John Milton Hay, Elihu Root, and Henry Lewis Stimson.

== Honors and awards ==
Rand was the first woman awarded a Beck Gold Medal by the Pennsylvania Academy of the Fine Arts. She was honored for her Portrait of the Hon. Donald T. Warner (1921) at PAFA's 1922 annual exhibition.

== Works ==
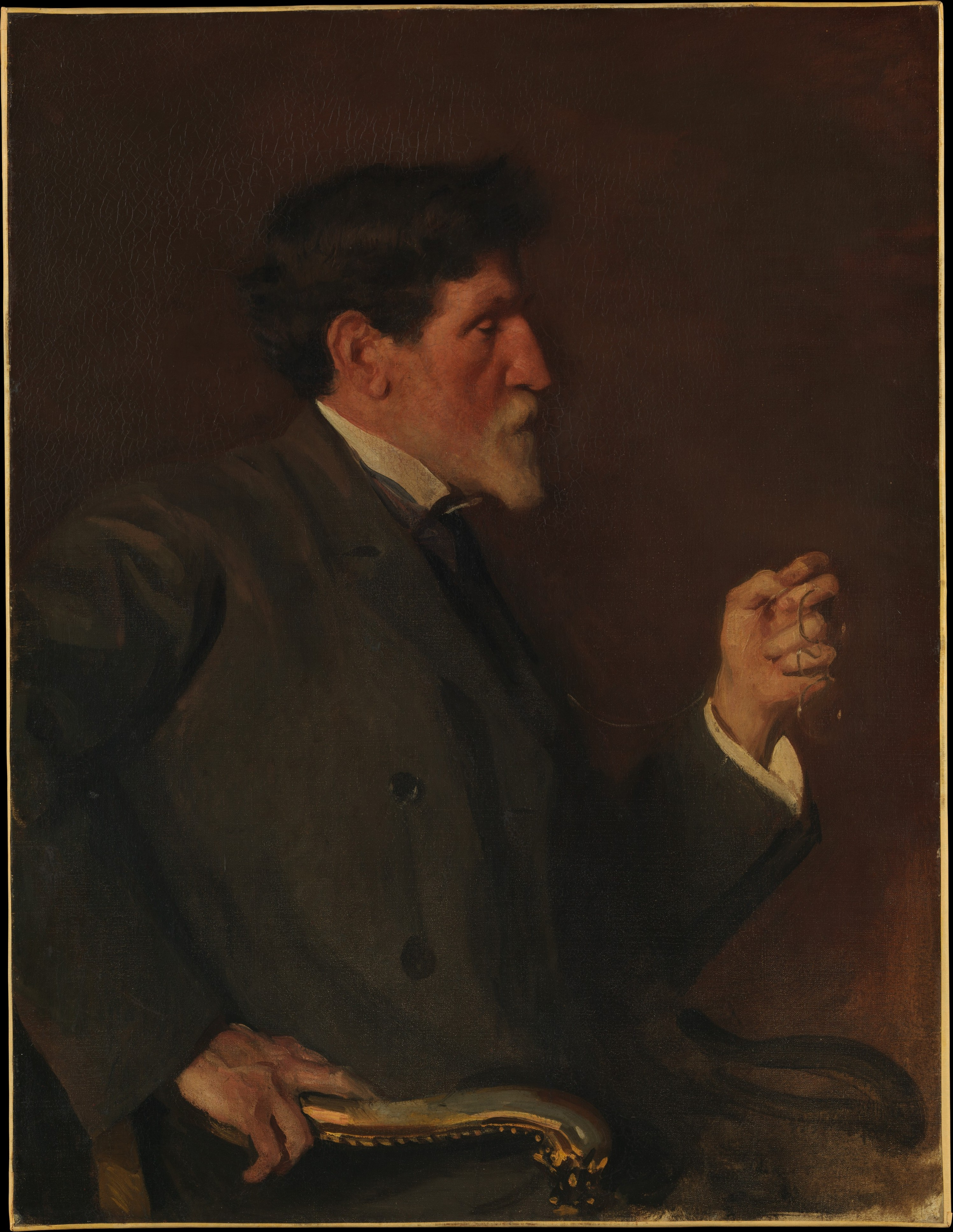
Augustus Saint-Gaudens (ca.1904), Metropolitan Museum of Art

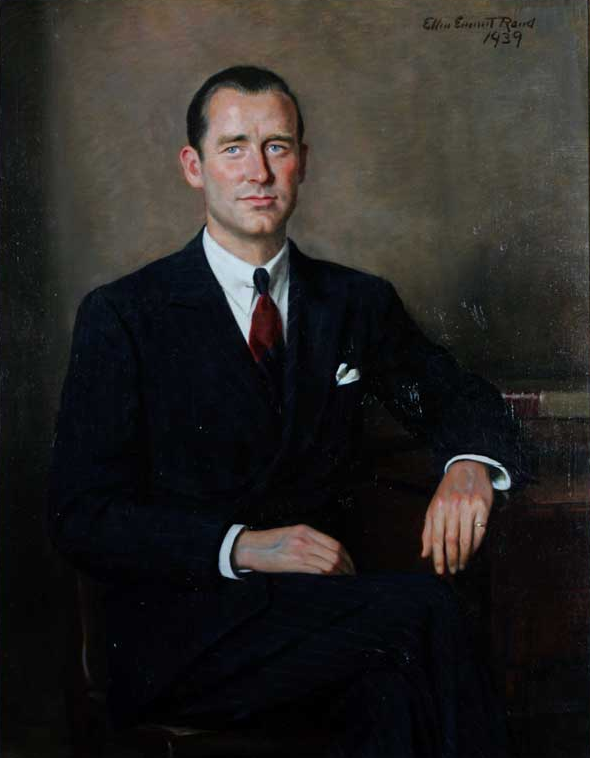
Governor William H. Vanderbilt III (1939), Vanderbilt University

- William Benton Museum of Art, University of Connecticut
  - Ellen Emmet Rand Online Gallery
- Harvard University Art Museums, Cambridge, Massachusetts
  - Rt. Rev. William T. Lawrence (1850–1941)
  - William Watson Goodwin (1831–1912)
  - Ada Louise Comstock (1876–1973)
  - Richard Glover Ames (died 1935) and Henry Russell Ames (died 1935)
- Hill-Stead Museum, Farmington, Connecticut
  - Ada Brooks Pope
- Metropolitan Museum of Art, New York City
  - Augustus Saint-Gaudens
  - Armory S. Carhart, Jr.
  - Benjamin Altman
  - William Sloane Coffin
- Smithsonian American Art Museum, Washington, D.C.
  - Mary Elizabeth Marvin Goodrich (wife of Benjamin Goodrich)
- Vanderbilt University Art Collection, Nashville, Tennessee
  - Ann Gordon Colby (Mrs. William Vanderbilt III)
  - Ellen French Vanderbilt
  - William H. Vanderbilt III
- Winterthur Museum Collections, Wilmington, Delaware
  - Henry Algernon du Pont
  - Henry Francis du Pont
  - Mary Pauline Foster du Pont
- U.S. Department of State, Washington, D.C.
  - United States Secretaries of State Gallery
