= Devereux Emmet =

American golf course architect (1861–1934)

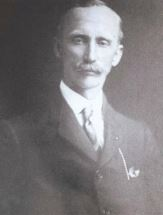
- Emmet, c. 1915
- Born: December 11, 1861; Pelham, New York
- Died: December 30, 1934 (aged 73); Garden City, New York
- Education: Columbia University
- Occupation: Architect
- Spouse: Ella B. Smith
- Children: 2
- Parent(s): William Jenkins Emmet and Julia Colt Pierson
- Projects: Bethpage State Park, 1923
- Design: Congressional Country Club (Blue), 1924

Devereux Emmet (December 11, 1861 – December 30, 1934) was a pioneering American golf course architect who designed more than 150 courses worldwide.

== Early life ==
Devereux Emmet was born in Pelham, New York, on December 11, 1861, one of eight children of William Jenkins Emmet and Julia Colt Pierson. He was the great-grandson of Thomas Addis Emmet.

== College and marriage ==
Coat of Arms of Devereux Emmet

Emmet graduated from Columbia University in 1883; in 1889 he married Ella B. Smith in an elaborate wedding at her home in New York City. Miss Smith, born in 1858, was the daughter of Judge J. Lawrence Smith and a niece of Alexander Turney Stewart. Ella's sister Elizabeth "Bessie" Springs Smith was the wife of architect Stanford White. The couple had two children, Richard Smith Emmet (born October 1889) and Devereux Emmet, Jr. (born January 1897).

== Golf course design career ==
On a vacation in England he spent time with his friend, Charles B. Macdonald, who was measuring British golf courses in preparation for the design of the National Golf Links of America. Emmet's first design was Island Golf Links, a predecessor of Garden City Golf Club. A friend of his remarked:

Emmet could not possibly conceive of any other use to which any given piece of real estate could be put except to lay out golf links on it.

In 1924 he hired Alfred H. Tull as a design associate, and in 1929 made him a partner in the firm of Emmet, Emmet and Tull. The Tull-Emmet partnership continued until Emmet's death in 1934.

== Amateur golf ==
Emmet was a talented amateur golfer. He made the quarter-finals of the 1904 British Amateur and won the Bahamas Amateur at the age of 66. In 1916, after he won the father-son tournament at Sleepy Hollow Country Club with Devereux Emmet, Jr., the United States Golf Association instituted the so-called architects rule that barred golf course architects from competing as amateurs in tournaments.

== Death and legacy ==
Devereux Emmet died in Garden City, New York, on December 30, 1934.

== Courses designed ==
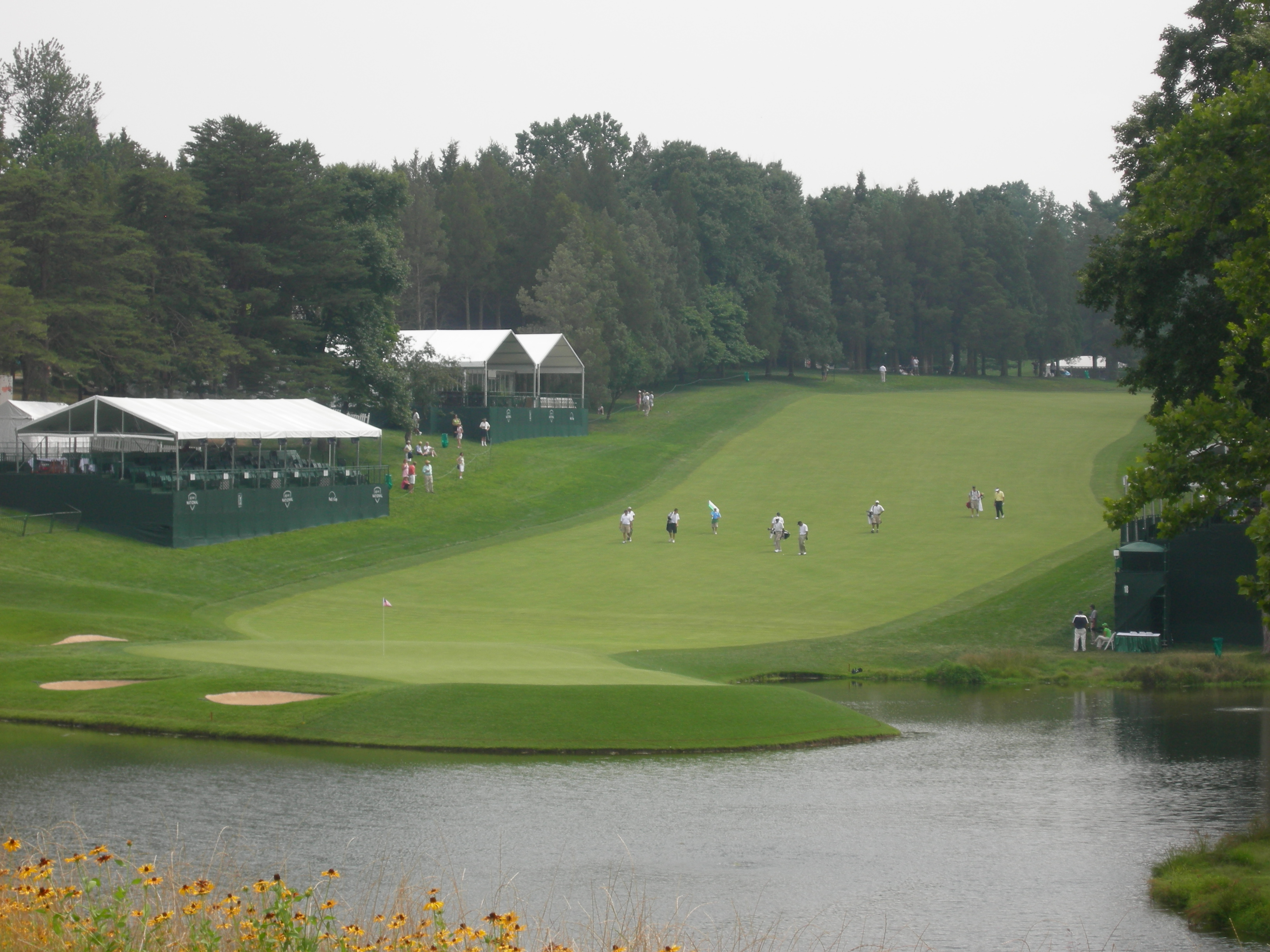
18th hole (formerly the 17th) of the Blue Course of the Congressional Country Club

Emmet designed many of his courses in an era of wooden-shafted clubs. Because the holes are often short by current standards many of his designs have since been reworked.

- Belmont Hills Country Club, St Clairsville, Ohio, 1924
- Bethpage State Park (Green), Farmingdale, New York, 1923
- Congressional Country Club (Blue), Bethesda, Maryland, 1924
- Congressional Country Club (Gold), Bethesda, Maryland, 1924

(remodeled by George Fazio and Tom Fazio in 1977 and by Arthur Hills in 2000)

- Hartford Golf Club (Blue, Green), West Hartford, Connecticut, 1914
- Bedford Golf and Tennis Club Bedford, New York, 1891
- Brentwood Country Club, Brentwood, New York, 1925
- Capital Hills at Albany, Albany, New York, 1928
- Cherry Valley Club, Garden City, New York, 1916
- Coonamessett Country Club Falmouth, Massachusetts (now Cape Cod Country Club)
- Copake Country Club, Craryville, New York, 1921 (; no evidence has ever been presented showing Devereux Emmet was at Copake Country Club)
- Dudley Hill Golf Club (9 holes), Dudley, Massachusetts, 1926
- Edison Club, Rexford, New York, 1925
- Engineers Country Club, Roslyn Harbor, New York, 1921

(originally designed by Herbert Strong, remodeled by Devereux Emmet in 1921)

- Country Club of Farmington, Farmington, Connecticut, 1924
- Garden City Golf Club, Garden City, New York, 1899 (later remodeled by Walter Travis)
- Leatherstocking Golf Course, Cooperstown, New York, 1909
- Mohawk Golf Club (East), Schenectady, New York, 1907
- Glen Head Country Club, Glen Head, New York, 1920s
- Hartford Golf Club (Green, Red), West Hartford, Connecticut, 1914
- Greenacres Country Club, Lawrenceville, New Jersey, 1932
- Green Meadow Club, Rye, New York, 1917 - known today as Harrison Meadows Country Club. The Green Meadow Golf Club was an offshoot of The Apawamis Club and formed in 1917 directly adjacent to Apawamis but with frontage on North Street. In fact, in 1927 the two clubs considered consolidating.
- Hampshire Country Club, Mamaroneck, New York, 1927
- Huntington Country Club, Huntington, New York, 1910
- Huntington Crescent Club, Huntington, New York, 1914

(renovated by Devereux Emmet and Alfred H. Tull in 1931)

- Keney Park Golf Club, Hartford, Connecticut, 1927
- Lake Isle Country Club, Eastchester, 1926
- Leewood Golf Club (Eastchester (town), New York) 1922
- Long Hill Country Club, East Hartford, Connecticut, 1930
- Mahopac Golf Club, Mahopac, New York, 1893
- Manchester Country Club, Manchester, Connecticut, 1917

(with Tom Bendelow)

- McGregor Links Country Club, Saratoga Springs, New York
- Mechanicville Golf Club, Mechanicville, New York, 1909
- Nassau Country Club, Glen Cove, New York, 1896
- Oliver D. Appleton Golf Course at St. Lawrence University, Canton, NY 1926 (Original 9 holes)
- Pelham Country Club, Pelham Manor, New York, 1908
- Pomonok Country Club, Queens, New York, 1921 – closed in 1949
- Powelton Club, Newburgh, New York, 1892
- Radisson Cable Beach & Golf Resort, Commonwealth of the Bahamas, 1929
- Eisenhower Park Golf Course (Red), East Meadow, New York, 1914
- Hartford Golf Club (Red, Blue), West Hartford, Connecticut, 1896

(with Donald Ross)

- Riddell's Bay Golf and Country Club, The Islands of Bermuda, 1922
- Ridgewood Country Club, Danbury, Connecticut, 1927
- Rockaway River Country Club, Denville, New Jersey, 1923
- Rockville Links Club, Rockville Centre, New York, 1924
- Rye Golf Club, Rye, New York, 1921
- Salisbury Golf Club, East Meadow, New York
- Schuyler Meadows Club, Loudonville, New York, 1928
- Seawane Country Club, Hewlett Harbor, New York, 1927
- St. George's Golf & Country Club, East Setauket, New York, 1917
- St. Mary's Country Club, Saint Mary's, Pennsylvania, 1924
- Wee Burn Country Club, Darien, Connecticut, 1902
- Mohawk Golf Club (West), Schenectady, New York, 1903
- Wheatley Hills Golf Club, East Williston, New York, 1913

(remodeled by Devereux Emmet and Alfred Tull in 1931)

- Wheeling Country Club, Wheeling, West Virginia, 1902
- Wheeling Park Golf Course, Wheeling, West Virginia, 1926
