= Elizabeth Emmet Lenox-Conyngham =

Irish poet and translator (1800–1889)

- Born: Elizabeth Emmet Holmes; 1800; Dublin, Ireland
- Died: 23 October 1889 (aged 88–89); 27 Cheyne Walk, Chelsea, London, England
- Resting place: Brompton Cemetery
- Occupations: Poet; translator
- Spouse: George Lenox-Conyngham (m. 1827; died 1866)
- Parents: Robert Holmes (father); Mary Anne Emmet (mother)
- Relatives: Robert Emmet (uncle); Thomas Addis Emmet (uncle); Christopher Temple Emmet (uncle); Hayes St Leger, 4th Viscount Doneraile (son-in-law)
- Writing career
- Pen name: Mrs. George Lenox-Conyngham

Elizabeth Emmet Lenox-Conyngham (Note: Also cited as Elizabeth Emmet Lenox-Conyngham.) (née Holmes; 1800 – 23 October 1889), also known as Mrs. George Lenox-Conyngham, was an Irish poet and translator.

== Early life and family ==
Lenox-Conyngham was born Elizabeth Emmet Holmes in 1800 in Dublin, to Robert Holmes, a barrister, and Mary Anne Holmes, a poet and writer. The eldest of two siblings, Holmes’ brother died in infancy, and her mother died when she was five years old. Through her mother, Holmes was the niece of Christopher Temple Emmet, a barrister and poet, Thomas Addis Emmet, a lawyer and United Irishman, and Robert Emmet, a Republican and United Irishman who was executed when she was three years old.

In 1827, Holmes married George Lenox-Conyngham, a botanist and chief clerk of the Foreign Office in London. The couple had two children, the diplomat George "Gino" Lenox-Conyngham (died 1866) and Mary Anne "May" St Leger, Viscountess Donerail (1828–1907). In 1851, May married Hayes St Leger, 4th Viscount Doneraile, and following the death of Hayes St Leger, 3rd Viscount Doneraile in 1854, became the Viscountess Donerail.

== Career ==
Lenox–Conyngham published her first book, The Dream, and Other Poems, in 1833 under the name Mrs. George Lenox-Conyngham. The work included both Lenox–Conyngham's poetry and previously unpublished poems by her mother, as well translations of poetry by Friedrich von Matthisson and sonnets by Vincenzo da Filicaja. Lenox-Conyngham's German translations received praise fromCharles Stuart Stanford, the editor of the Dublin University Magazine. During her lifetime Lenox-Conyngham published three more works: Hella and other poems (1836), Horae poeticae: lyrical and other poems (1859), and Eiler and Helvig: a Danish legend in verse (1863).

Lenox-Conyngham also wrote List of Italian Authors on Military Science, communicated by Major Portlock R. E., F. R. S. which was published by "Paper 11" in First Number of the [Engineers] Corps papers, and memoirs on military subjects.

== Personal life ==
Following her father's retirement in 1852, he lived with Lenox-Conyngham at her London home until his death in 1859.

On 23 October 1889, Lenox-Conyngham died at 27 Cheyne Walk, Chelsea and was buried the same day at Brompton Cemetery.

== Bibliography ==
- Mrs. George Lenox-Conyngham (1833). The dream and other poems. London: Edward Moxon.
- Mrs. George Lenox-Conyngham. Hella and other poems. London: Edward Churton.
- Mrs. George Lenox-Conyngham (1859). Horae poeticae: lyrical and other poems.
- Mrs. George Lenox-Conyngham (1863). Eiler and Helvig: a Danish legend in verse. London: Chapman and Hall.
