= List of monuments and memorials to the Irish Rebellion of 1798 =

A number of monuments and memorials dedicated to the Irish Rebellion of 1798 exist in Ireland and in other countries. Some of the monuments are in remembrance of specific battles or figures, whilst others are general war memorials.

== Ireland ==
Image	Monument/Memorial	City/Town	County	Subject	Ref
	Aughrim Bridge 1798 Memorial	Aughrim	Co. Wicklow	Aughrim Bridge	
	Arklow 1798 Memorial	Arklow	Co. Wicklow	Battle of Arklow	
	Michael Murphy Memorial	Arklow	Co. Wicklow	Michael Murphy	
	Ballinakill 1798 Memorial	Ballinakill	Co. Laois	Local veterans	
	Ballinamuck 1798 Garden of Remembrance	Ballinamuck	Co. Longford	Battle of Ballinamuck	
	Ballinamuck 1798 Memorial	Ballinamuck	Co. Longford	Battle of Ballinamuck	
	1798 Memorial	Ballindaggin	Co. Wexford	General war memorial	
	Teresa Malone Memorial	Ballinkillin	Co. Carlow	Heroine of the ballad 'The Battle of Kilgumney'	
	Ballycumber 1798 Memorial	Ballycumber	Co. Offaly	Local veterans	
	Dwyer and MacAllister Memorial	Baltinglass	Co. Wicklow	Michael Dwyer and Sam McAllister	
	1798 Memorial	Bray	Co. Wicklow	General war memorial	
	Bunclody 1798 Memorial	Bunclody	Co. Wexford	Battle of Bunclody	
	Bunclody 1798 Bicentenary Memorial	Bunclody	Co. Wexford	Battle of Bunclody	
	Hurley Memorial	Buttevant	Co. Cork	David Hurley	
	Camolin 1798 Memorial	Camolin	Co. Wexford	Local veterans	
	1798 Memorial	Castlebridge	Co. Wexford	General war memorial	
	Kearns Memorial	Castlecomer	Co. Kilkenny	The Battle of Castlecomer	
	Charleville Memorial	Charleville	Co. Cork	Local veterans	
	Clane 1798 Memorial	Clane	Co. Kildare	Battle of Coiseanna Hill	
	Clonakilty 1798 Memorial	Clonakilty	Co. Cork	Local veterans	
	Battle of Big Cross Memorial	Clonakilty	Co. Cork	Battle of the Big Cross	
	Clonegal 1798 Memorial	Clonegal	Co. Carlow	Local veterans	
	1798 Memorial	Castlebar	Co. Mayo	General war memorial	
	1798 Memorial	Clonmel	Co. Tipperary	General war memorial	
	1799 Memorial	Cloyne	Co. Cork	General war memorial	
	National Monument	Cork	Co. Cork	General war memorial	
	Culmullen 1798 Memorial	Culmullen	Co. Meath	Local veterans	
	1798 Memorial	Curragha	Co. Meath	Local veterans	
	French 1796 Invasion Memorial	Bantry	Co. Cork	French expedition to Ireland (1796)	
	Croppies' Acre Memorial Park	Dublin	Co. Dublin	General war memorial	
	Garden of Remembrance	Dublin	Co. Dublin	General war memorial	
	Wolfe Tone Memorial	Dublin	Co. Dublin	Theobald Wolfe Tone	
	Four Courts 1798 Memorial	Dublin	Co. Dublin	General war memorial	
	Newgate Prison 1798 Memorial	Dublin	Co. Dublin	General war memorial	
	1798 Memorial	Dunboyne	Co. Meath	General war memorial	
	1798 Memorial, Dundalk	Dundalk	Co. Louth	Local veterans	
	Dungarvan 1798 Memorial	Dungarvin	Co. Waterford	Local veterans	
	Dunlavin 1798 Memorial	Dunlavin	Co. Wicklow	Local veterans	
	Croppy Memorial	Dunshaughlin	Co. Meath	Dunlavin Green executions	
	1798 Memorial	Enniscorthy	Co. Wexford	General war memorial	
	Vinegar Hill Memorial	Enniscorthy	Co. Wexford	Battle of Vinegar Hill	
	Barker Memorial	Enniscorthy	Co. Wexford	Captain William Barker	
	Fr. John Murphy Memorial	Ferns	Co. Wexford	John Murphy	
	1798 Memorial	Killala	Co. Mayo	Battle of Killala	
	Geneva Barracks Memorial	Passage East	Co. Waterford	General war memorial	
	1798 Memorial	Gorey	Co. Wexford	General war memorial	
	Gorey Market House 1798 Memorial	Gorey	Co. Wexford	General war memorial	
	FitzGerald Memorial	Gort	Co. Galway	Lord Edward FitzGerald	
	1798 Memorial	Glenmalure	Co. Wicklow	Local veterans	
	Tara 1798 Memorial	Hill of Tara	Co. Meath	Croppies and the Battle of Tara Hill	
	Kilcumney Hill Memorial	Kilcumney Hill	Co. Carlow	Battle of Kilcumney Hill	
	Fitzgerald Memorial	Kildare	Co. Kildare	Lord Edward FitzGerald	
	Staker Wallace Memorial	Kilfinane	Co. Limerick	Staker Wallace	
	1798 Memorial	Killurin	Co. Wexford	General war memorial	
	Fr. Kearns Memorial	Kiltealy	Co. Wexford	General war memorial	
	Mallow 1798 Memorial	Mallow	Co. Cork	Local veterans	
	Staker Wallace Memorial	Martinstown	Co. Limerick	Staker Wallace	
	The Tree of Liberty Stone	Maynooth	Co. Kildare	United Irishmen	
	Kearns and Perry Memorial	Monasteroris	Co. Offaly	Mogue Kearns and Anthony Perry	
	United Irishmen Memorial	Mountmellick	Co. Laois	General war memorial	
	1798 Monument	Mullens Cross	Co. Meath	Battle of Knightstown Bog	
	1798 Memorial	Cleariestown	Co. Wexford	General war memorial	
	1798 Memorial	New Ross	Co. Wexford	General war memorial	
	Newtownmountkennedy 1798 Memorial	Newtownmountkennedy	Co. Wicklow	Local veterans	
	Míchil Uí Néill Memorial	Newtownmountkennedy	Co. Wicklow		
	1798 Memorial	Oulart	Co. Wexford	Battle of Oulart Hill	
	Portarlington 1798 Memorial	Portarlington	Co. Laois	Local veterans	
	Ruth Hackett 1798 Rebellion Plaque	Prosperous	Co. Kildare	Ruth Hackett and the Battle of Prosperous	
	Rathcoole 1798 Memorial	Rathcoole	Co. Dublin	Local veterans	
	1798 Memorial	Rathcormac	Co. Cork		
	Rathvilly 1798 Memorial	Rathvilly	Co. Carlow	Local veterans	
	Sligo 1798 Memorial	Sligo	Co. Sligo	Local veterans	
	1798 Memorial	St Mullin's	Co. Carlow	General war memorial	
	Thurles 1798 Memorial	Thurles	Co. Tipperary	Local veterans	
	The Pikeman	Tralee	Co. Clare		
	Fr. Murphy Memorial	Tullow	Co. Carlow	John Murphy	
	Pikemen	Between New Ross and Wexford	Co. Wexford	General war memorial	
	1798 Memorial	Wexford	Co. Wexford	General war memorial	
	Tree of Liberty	Wexford	Co. Wexford	General war memorial	
	Billy Byrne monument	Wicklow	Co. Wicklow	Billy Byrne, Michael Dwyer, General William J. Holt, and William Michael Byrne	
	The Liberty Tree	Carlow	Co. Carlow	General war memorial	

== Australia ==
Image	Monument/Memorial	City/Town	State	Subject	Ref
	1798 Memorial	Sydney	New South Wales	1798 War Memorial stands over the grave of Michael Dwyer in Waverley Cemetery	

== See also ==
- List of monuments and memorials to the Irish Rebellion of 1803
- List of monuments and memorials to the Fenian Rebellion
