= List of monuments and memorials to the Fenian Rebellion =

A number of monuments and memorials dedicated to the Fenian Rising of 1867 exist in Ireland. Some of the monuments are in remembrance of specific battles or figures, whilst others are general war memorials.

== Ireland ==
Image	Monument/Memorial	City/Town	County	Subject	Ref
	Fenian Memorial	Ballyhusty	Co. Tipperary	Fenians of West Tipperary	
	Dwyer and Mcallister Memorial	Baltinglass	Co. Wicklow	Michael Dwyer and Sam McAllister	
	Charleville Memorial	Charleville	Co. Cork	General war memorial	
	National Memorial	Cork	Co. Cork	General war memorial; features a statue of Peter O'Neill Crowley	
	James Mountain Memorial	Cork	Co. Cork	Young Irelander James Mountain	
	Garden of Remembrance	Dublin	Co. Dublin	General war memorial	
	Fenian Men Memorial	Tallaght	Co. Dublin	Fenians	
	O'Neill-Crowley Memorial	Mitchelstown	Co. Cork	Peter O'Neill Crowley	
	Kilmallock Memorial	Kilmallock	Co. Limerick	Fenians	
	Lattin Memorial	Lattin	Co. Tipperary	Fenians	
	Ballycohey Memorial	Shronell	Co. Tipperary	Fenians	
	Maid of Erin	Tipperary	Co. Tipperary	Fenians	
	Billy Byrne monument	Wicklow	Co. Wicklow	Billy Byrne, Michael Dwyer, General William J. Holt, and William Michael Byrne	

== See also ==
- List of monuments and memorials to the Irish Rebellion of 1798
- List of monuments and memorials to the Irish Rebellion of 1803
