= List of monuments and memorials to the Irish Rebellion of 1803 =

A number of monuments and memorials dedicated to the Irish rebellion of 1803 exist in Ireland. Some of the monuments are in remembrance of specific battles or figures, whilst others are general war memorials.

== Ireland ==
Image	Monument/Memorial	City/Town	County	Subject	Ref
	Dwyer and Mcallister Memorial	Baltinglass	Wicklow	Michael Dwyer and Sam McAllister	
	Charleville Memorial	Charleville	Cork	Memorial to victims of the 1798 Rebellion and 1803 rebellion	
	National Monument	Cork	Cork	General war memorial	
	Russell Memorial	Downpatrick	Down	Thomas Russell	
	Garden of Remembrance	Dublin	Dublin	General war memorial	
	Emmet Memorial Statue	Dublin	Dublin	Robert Emmet	
	Emmet Memorial Tablet	Dublin	Dublin	Robert Emmet	
	Emmet Memorial	Harold's Cross	Dublin	Robert Emmet	
	1803 Memorial	Dublin	Dublin	1803 rebellion	
	Maynooth 1803 Memorial	Maynooth	Kildare	1803 rebellion	
	Billy Byrne monument	Wicklow	Wicklow	Billy Byrne, Michael Dwyer, General William J. Holt, and William Michael Byrne	

== United Kingdom ==
Image	Monument/Memorial	City/Town	County	Subject	Ref
	Henry Cole Memorial	Kew (in the church)	Greater London, England	Henry Cole, a British soldier injured in the 1803 Rebellion who was also a churchwarden of St Anne's Church	

== United States ==
Image	Monument/Memorial	City/Town	State	Subject	Ref
	Emmet Memorial Statue	Washington D.C	District of Columbia	Robert Emmet	

== See also ==
- List of monuments and memorials to the Irish Rebellion of 1798
- List of monuments and memorials to the Fenian Rebellion
