= Sarah Lawrence (educator) =

Sarah Lawrence (1780–1859) was an English educator, writer and literary editor. She ran a girls' school in Gateacre near Liverpool, and was a family friend of the Aikins of Warrington, and an associate of members of the Roscoe circle.

== Early life ==
The Lawrence family were self-consciously descendants, in the fifth generation, of Philip Henry (1631–1696), an ejected minister. Sarah was one of nine daughters and two sons (two daughters and one son dying young) of Nathaniel Lawrence of Birmingham, who married in 1777 Mary Johnson. The family belonged to the congregation of the Old Meeting House on Worcester Street. Nathaniel was a chapel warden in 1785. Both the Old Meeting House, and the New Meeting House on Moor Street, were destroyed in the first phase of the 1791 Priestley Riots, on the orders of an under-sheriff and two magistrates.

In 1793 Nathaniel Lawrence lost his business in a financial slump. A Nathaniel Lawrence of Birmingham declared bankrupt that year was a wine merchant. Mary Lawrence and her daughters set up a girls' school in Birmingham.

Eliza, the eldest daughter, at this time spent a period as a governess, as did other sisters, Sarah among them. Mary's plan was that her daughters should spend time in other families, coming together later in a family-run school. In Sarah's case, she was a governess in the household of Peter Crompton of Eton House, a radical physician and anti-corruption campaigner in Liverpool.

== The school at Gateacre ==
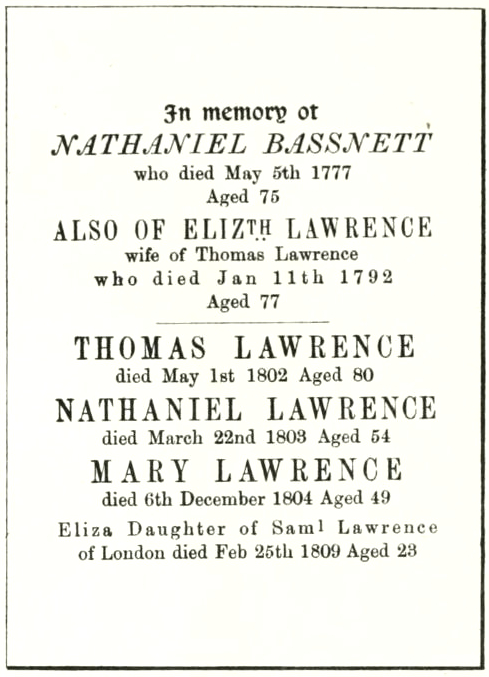
Reproduction of a plaque for Sarah Lawrence's parents and others, in the Old Meeting House, Birmingham

After the death of her parents Nathaniel and Mary, Sarah Lawrence, described as "a writer, poet and good Horatian scholar", with other members of her family founded a school for girls in Gatacre near Liverpool in 1807; she became the principal. It built up a good reputation. There was an existing successful school in Gateacre, run by the Unitarian minister William Shepherd. Together, in early decades of the 19th century, the two schools at Gateacre were "where the sons and daughters of the merchant aristocracy of Liverpool were educated".

Schools of this time run in accordance with Unitarian views might do so tacitly, and attract pupils from Anglican families. The Lawrences' school has been considered Unitarian, in a group with Lant Carpenter's school in Bristol, and locally the Everton school founded by the Swiss educator Carl Voelker. Sarah Lawrence subscribed to the 1823 book of sermons of Henry Turner (died 1822), minister of the Unitarian High Pavement Chapel in Nottingham, as did Miss Benton of Gateacre, who in 1815 was advertising a preparatory school for boys 5 to 15 there, giving Shepherd, the Miss Lawrences and the Rev. Christopher Wyvill as references. Advertising a school in Allerton, Liverpool in 1828, Voelker and Staehle used as references Sarah Lawrence, Thomas Stewart Traill and the Rev. Augustus Campbell of Childwall. Another successful founder of a Unitarian school, near Wakefield, was Richmal Mangnall.

After a generation Sarah Lawrence's school suffered from financial limitations and parsimony, and it was taken over in 1839, transferred to the Misses Holland. By this time, there was a fashionable boys' preparatory school at Gateacre, run by Miss Hunt, and attended by Edmund Knowles Muspratt and Henry Enfield Roscoe.

=== Location and aftermath ===
The Hollands' school was called at this point Gateacre School. They left it around 1863. On the site, Cornelius Sherlock built for Andrew Barclay Walker Gatacre Grange, in 1866.

=== Pupils and their backgrounds ===
Helen Bourn (1797–1871), a pupil at the school, came from a "distinguished middle-class family", but also one with a long tradition of nonconformist ministry, from her great-grandfather Samuel Bourn the younger. She was an only child, her father Joseph Bourn being in business, probably textiles, and living in Bolton le Moors; her mother was Ellen Gaskell. Her father made difficulties about her first marriage, requiring that her fiancé should give up his medical career and move to north-west England as a fustian manufacturer. She married Thomas Martineau, brother of Harriet Martineau, was widowed, and married Edward Tagart.

The background of Dorothy Nicholson (1803–1893) who attended the Lawrences' school was nonconformist, mercantile and politically radical: her father Thomas Nicholson (1753–1825) of Gorton Hall was a cousin of Frances Nicholson (died 1829), Shepherd's wife, daughter of the Liverpool merchant Robert Nicholson (1727–1779) who was abolitionist and a governor of Warrington Academy; and she had early memories of the chant "Roscoe for ever!" of 1807. Dorothy was given tuition in the classics by Shepherd.

Jane Ashton (1806–1884) from the Manchester area, maternal grandmother of Beatrix Potter, attended the school. She was the daughter of John Ashton (1777–1845), a Unitarian and cotton manufacturer in Hyde, and his wife Harriot or Harriet Booth; and the sister of Thomas Ashton. She married John Leech, a cotton merchant in Stalybridge.

Catharine Aikin (Kitty, c.1819–1908) was a daughter of Charles Rochemont Aikin, son of Anna Laetitia Barbauld, and his wife Anne, daughter of Gilbert Wakefield, who died when she was two. Born in London, she attended the school for about 15 months around 1833, finding it an austere, strict place with only cold water to wash in, of around 40 girl boarders. In the early history of Bedford College, London, she served as Secretary to the Lady Visitors, a group of board members responsible for discipline.

== Family associations ==
Hannah Mary Rathbone, the author of The Diary of Lady Willoughby. kept a diary, in which Mary Crompton (the wife of Peter Crompton), her daughter, and Sarah Lawrence appear as a group of visitors in August 1805, and in October 1809. The first occasion is noted as "Miss Lawrence". Sara Coleridge, wife of Samuel Taylor Coleridge, visited the Cromptons and then the Lawrences in Birmingham at the end of 1806.

Eliza Lawrence took care of Catherine Emmet, orphaned daughter of Christopher Temple Emmet. William Drennan, who had met Catherine at the Cromptons, wrote to his sister that "Miss L is a singularly interesting girl", and that "Holmes is expected in England to take away Miss Emmet" from the school. Eliza married in 1810 Robert Holmes, Catherine's great-uncle, as his second wife, and died in 1811. Catherine, after a short period in the United States, then went to live with William Hazlitt at Addlestone.

In 1825 there were five surviving sisters, Eliza and Frances having died as adults: in order of age, Sarah, Mary, Arabella, Jane, and Harriet, none of whom married. William Rowan Hamilton was given a letter of introduction to Samuel Taylor Coleridge, by Sarah. This was in 1832 at the end of Coleridge's life: he replied to a letter from Sarah recalling memories of her and Peter Crompton's wife Mary.

Sarah Lawrence was a close friend of Arthur Aikin, and Charles Rochemont Aikin and family. She corresponded with Arthur, and Helen Martineau, sister-in-law of Harriet Martineau. Manuscripts from the correspondence with Martineau contain poems that have been attributed to Anna Letitia Barbauld, though they are in Lawrence's hand. It was in a letter to Sarah that Arthur described the last days of Anna Letitia, his aunt.

== Works ==
- Stories Selected from the History of Greece, for Children (1820)
- The Descendants of Philip Henry, M.A., Incumbent of Worthenbury, in the County of Flint (1844) Sarah worked on this project, which began with a family tree made by Helen Martineau, from about 1840, with Samuel Sharpe. The Sharpes were introduced to the Lawrence sisters by the family of Edwin Wilkins Field.
- The Laurel: Fugitive Poetry of the Nineteenth Century (1841), editor of the anthology.
- Poems (1847)

== Later lives and deaths ==
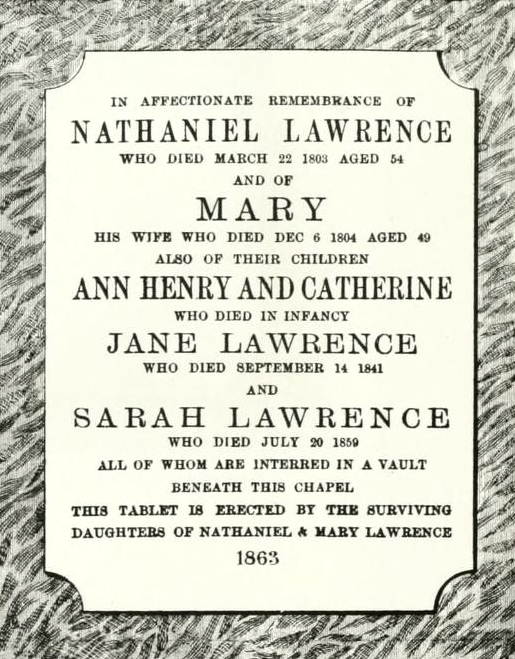
Memorial inscription from 1863 to Sarah Lawrence and her parents, and family members, in the Old Meeting House, Birmingham

Leaving Gateacre in 1839, the sisters moved to Leamington Spa. They lived at 2 Warwick Place. Jane Lawrence died in 1842. Sarah Lawrence died, at home in Warwick Place, on 20 July 1859. Harriet (given as "Harriette") died there on 10 March 1863. Mary Lawrence who died at Warwick Place, Leamington Spa, a few weeks later, formerly of "The Grange, Gatacre", presumably, was her sister.

Arabella Lawrence died at home, in Warwick Place, Leamington Spa, on 13 August 1873. She was the last survivor of the Lawrence sisters.

== Next generations ==
Sarah's brother Nathaniel Lawrence the younger married Francis Sarah Ogden, daughter of Abraham Ogden, in 1815. He had been in the United States since at least 1810. He died in 1824. There were three sons and two daughters of the marriage, the eldest son Robert Holmes Lawrence dying young. One of the sons was Philip Henry Lawrence (1822–1895). He was brought up by the Lawrence sisters, his aunts, as was his brother Nathaniel Tertius Lawrence. Mary Lawrence, one of the daughters, might be confused with her aunt of the same name. Sarah Frances, the other daughter, married in 1837 William Talbot, a solicitor in Kidderminster; they had four sons and two daughters.

Penelope Lawrence, founder with her half-sisters of Roedean School, was the daughter of Philip Henry Lawrence and his first wife Charlotte Bailey; Susan Lawrence the politician was the daughter of Nathaniel Tertius Lawrence and his wife Laura Bacon, daughter of James Bacon. Laura Frances, eldest daughter of Nathaniel Tertius Lawrence, married in 1884 Henry Turton Norton, and was mother of Jane Elizabeth Norton and Henry Turton James Norton.
