= Mary Anne Holmes =

Irish poet and writer (1773-1805)

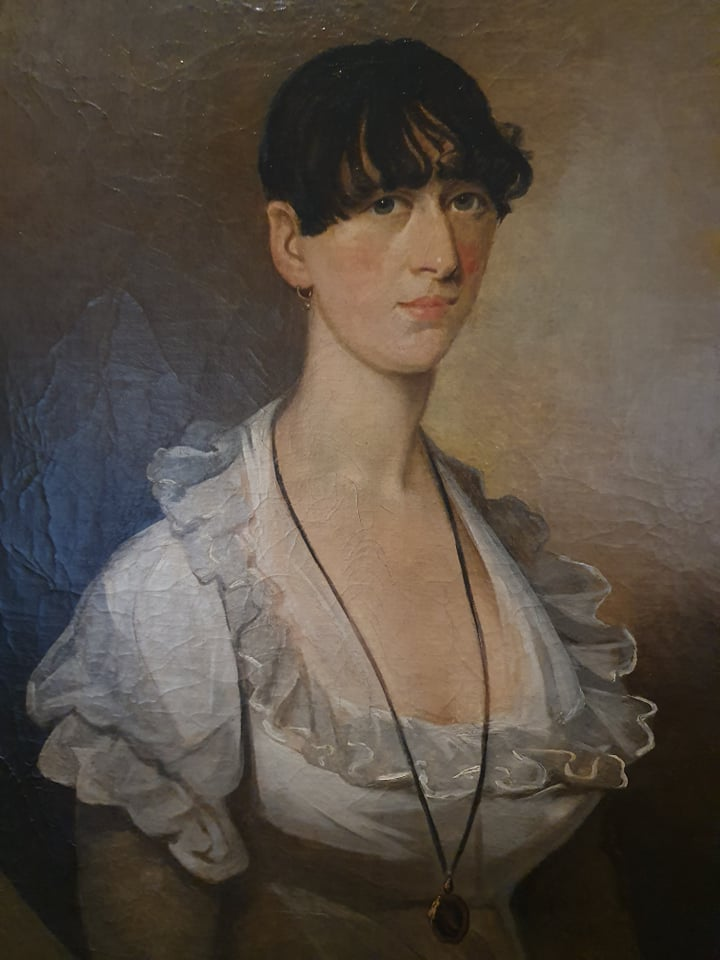
- Portrait of Holmes by Thomas Hickey, 1799
- Born: Mary Anne Emmet; 10 October 1773; Dublin, Ireland
- Died: 10 March 1805 (aged 31)
- Resting place: St. Peter's Church
- Spouse: Robert Homes (m. 1799)
- Children: 2, including: Elizabeth Emmet Lenox-Conyngham
- Relatives: Christopher Temple Emmet (brother); Thomas Addis Emmet (brother); Robert Emmet (brother)

Mary Anne Holmes (née Emmet; 10 October 1773 – 10 March 1805) was an Irish poet and writer connected to the Society of United Irishmen.

== Life ==
Holmes was born Mary Anne Emmet on 10 October 1773 in Dublin to Robert Emmet (1729–1802), the state physician of Ireland, and Elizabeth Emmet (née Mason). (Note: Holmes' first name is also cited as Maryanne.) One of seventeen children, only Holmes and three of her brothers survived to adulthood. Holmes was the sister of Christopher Temple Emmet, a barrister and poet, Thomas Addis Emmet, a lawyer and United Irishman, and Robert Emmet, a Republican and United Irishman.

As a young woman, she was noted for her intelligence and was a classical scholar. Her father lauded her "good character" and was very hopeful she would make a good wife. Holmes was interested in politics and was a member of liberal intellectual circles. She was a correspondent of Margaret King about their common passion for the writings of Mary Wollstonecraft. In 1793, a family friend William Drennan described her as genteel but distant. He predicted her match with the barrister Robert Holmes, who she secretly married on 21 September 1799 in the Dublin Unitarian Church. The couple had 2 children, with Drennan, a physician, attending all the births. One of their children was Elizabeth Emmet Lenox-Conyngham.

Robert Holmes attended to the Emmet family's legal affairs for a time, with the couple living with her parents at Casino, near Milltown, Dublin. Holmes helped to raise the children of her brother Thomas Addis, after he was sent to Fort George, Highland, Scotland for his involvement with the United Irishmen. During this time, their mother's letters to Thomas Addis note Holmes' devotion to her husband but also her delicate health and tendency towards low spirits. Holmes was the only surviving child of their 17 children who was still in Ireland; she was a comfort to her parents in their old age. Her father died in 1802, and her mother almost died in 1803 at the same time as the arrest and execution of her brother Robert. Some claim that Holmes attempted to recover her brother's body but failed.

After the failed insurrection of 1803, her husband was arrested, but she was allowed to spend approximately a week with him. It had long been claimed that she collapsed and died on her doorstep following his release in February 1804. In truth, she had given birth to a son at home, following which her health worsened and her hearing also deteriorated. Her son, Hugh, also later died. She was attended to by Drennan, who worried that she was succumbing to tuberculosis that December. Holmes died on 10 March 1805 and was buried with her parents in the graveyard of St. Peter's Church, Aungier Street, Dublin. There is a legend that her brother Robert's body was interred with her in secret, but this is unconfirmed. A portrait of Holmes by Thomas Hickey is held by Kilmainham Gaol.

== Poetry and writing ==
Holmes wrote prose and verse for the Press, a publication associated with the Society of United Irishmen. In 1799 she was active, along with members of her extended family, in the movement opposed to the legislative union of Ireland with the United Kingdom. The pamphlet An address to the people of Ireland was attributed to her, but is now thought to have been written by Roger O'Connor. Holmes' poems were included in her daughter's 1833 book of verse The dream and other poems.
