= St. Peter's Church, Aungier Street, Dublin =

Former church in Ireland

Coordinates: 53°20′21.66″N 6°15′57.94″W

St. Peter's Church
- Teampall Pheadair
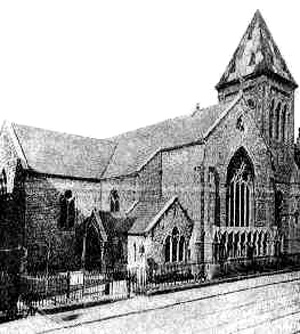
- St. Peter's Church in the 19th century.

- Location: Aungier Street, Dublin
- Country: Ireland
- Denomination: Church of Ireland

History
- Former name: St. Peter del Hille
- Dedication: St. Peter

Architecture
- Architectural type: Gothic
- Completed: 1685
- Closed: 1950
- Demolished: 1983

Administration
- Parish: United Parish of St. Peter and St. Kevin

St. Peter's Church was a former Church of Ireland parish church located in Aungier Street in Dublin, Ireland, where the Dublin YMCA building now stands. It was built on land that formerly belonged to the Whitefriars in Dublin. It served the largest Church of Ireland parish in Dublin.

== The church ==
The land of the Whitefriars, who arrived in Dublin in the 12th century, took in what was probably a pre-Viking Irish monastic settlement. A small church, dedicated to St. Peter (St. Peter del Hille - St. Peter on the Hill), was built in 1280 near present-day Stephen Street Later a hostel and church, dedicated to St. Stephen (after which St. Stephen's Green is named) and for the use of lepers, was built nearby, and its clergy also administered to the parishioners of St. Peter's. The Whitefriars were dissolved by Henry VIII in the 16th century and their lands forfeited by the Crown during the Reformation.

In 1625 Sir Francis Aungier obtained a grant to the Whitefriars' estates. A later Francis Aungier (created Earl of Longford) started developing the area and while building Aungier Street in 1677 also contributed to the building of the church, which was completed in 1685. The church took the place of the two older churches, both falling into ruin.

=== Georgian rebuilding (1750-52) ===
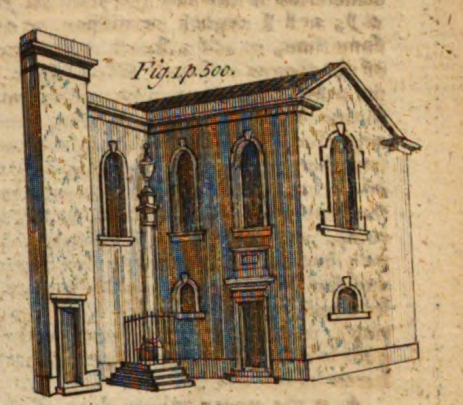
Bishop Thomas Rundle monument at St Peter's Church, Dublin from an illustration of 1789.

The church appears to have been largely rebuilt to a Georgian style under the direction of architect Michael Wills from 1750 to 1752.

The new St Peter's was enlarged in 1773.

=== Gothic rebuilding (1864-67) ===
It was rebuilt in the Gothic style in 1867, retaining only the nave walls of the original church. The architect was Edward Henry Carson, father of Edward Carson. At the time it was the largest Church of Ireland parish church in Dublin. The church was demolished in 1983.

In the 19th century, charity sermons were delivered in the church by guest preachers. The most famous of these at the church was the Rev. Walter Blake Kirwan (1754–1805). For a number of years, he managed to raise over £4,000 per annum for charity, in addition to donations of jewellery, watches and other items which parishioners overcome with emotion spontaneously threw into the collection plate.

== The churchyard ==
The churchyard of St. Peter's was the final resting place of many members of the parish, which in the 19th century grew to be the largest Church of Ireland parish in Dublin. It was also used as a burial place by the Huguenot community. The churchyard continued in use until about 1883.

After the church was closed the churchyard was taken over by W & R Jacob's biscuit factory as a recreation ground for its staff. When the land was developed in the 1980s the remains of the Huguenots were transferred to Mount Jerome cemetery. In December 2000 planning permission was granted to the YMCA by Dublin Corporation to erect a hostel at the site.

Among the notable people buried in St. Peter's Churchyard were the Earl of Roden and several members of his family, along with a great number of bishops and other dignitaries. Also interred there are the Dunboyne family, the judge Charles Burton, Mary Anne Holmes, and the notorious Black Jack Fitzgibbon, Earl of Clare and Lord High Chancellor of Ireland.

The war memorial from the Church was restored and relocated to St. Catherine and James Church, Donore Ave in 2015.

== The parish ==
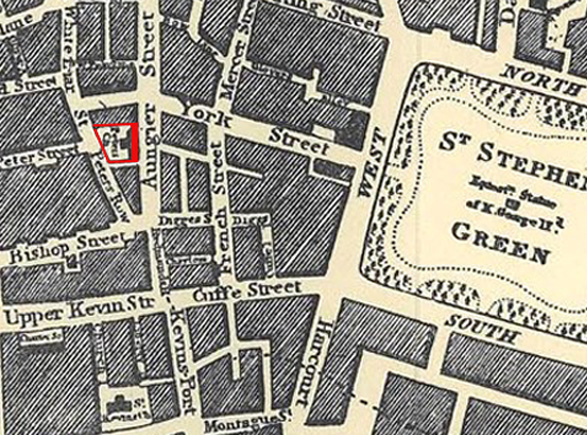
Location of St. Peter's church (in red) on an 1829 map of Dublin

Due to the shortage of clergymen after the Restoration, the new parish of St. Peter in 1680 consisted of the old parish, the whole of St. Kevin's, almost all St. Stephen's and a good part of St. Bridged's. Due to the large size of the parish, several chapels of ease were required to administer it. These included St. Kevin's in Camden Row, St. Stephen's in Mount St. and several others. The parish corresponded to the civil parish of St. Peter's.

The Church of Ireland parish which St. Peter's served, following its closure, was served by the adjacent parishes of St. Lukes', St. Audoens and St. Catherine, and St. James. From 1970, parishes St. Peter's Church, Aungier Street, St Matthias and St Audoen; St. Catherine and James Church; St Luke (The Coombe) and St Kevin (Camden Row) became part of the St. Patrick's Cathedral group of churches.

== Notable parishioners ==
Notable parishioners associated with St. Peter's when the church was built in the 17th century were the Cuffe family (after whom Cuffe Street is named), who were relatives of the Aungiers, Lord Arran (son of the Duke of Ormonde), Lady Antrim and Lord Merrion and Lieutenant-general Archibald Hamilton, who fought at the Siege of Derry, in 1688.

Sir John Jeffreyson, judge of the Court of Common Pleas (Ireland), was buried here in 1700.

Arthur Wellesley, later the Duke of Wellington was baptised at St. Peter's on 30 April or 2 May 1769.

The novelist Charles Robert Maturin (1780–1824) was born in Dublin of a Huguenot family. In 1805 he became curate of St Peter's, where he remained until his death.

The church was the parochial church of the family of Robert Emmet and family members, notably Emmet's grand-nephew Dr. Thomas Addis Emmet, believed that Emmet was reburied in the family vault in St Peter's. According to this story, which was independently shared by the Hammond family, friends of the Emmets, the interment of Mary Anne Holmes around 1804 was used to secretly transfer Emmet's body from St. Michan's Church with the help of the Rev Thomas Gamble, who ministered in St Michan's.

The barrister John Connellan Deane, son of the prominent architect Thomas Deane, was married in the church in 1839; he died at Posillipo in 1887 and was buried in the English Cemetery, Naples.

Catherine, daughter of Owen Connellan, writer, antiquarian and Professor of Celtic Languages and Literature at Cork, who had a house in Emor Street, was married in the church.

The writer Catherine Mary MacSorley (1848–1929) was the daughter of Rev. John James MacSorley, rector of the church at the end of the 19th century.

George Bernard Shaw attended St. Peter's parish school in Camden Row.

== References and sources ==
Sources

- Maurice Craig: Dublin 1666–1866
- Gilbert, John (1854). A History of the City of Dublin. Oxford: Oxford University.
- George Newenham Wright (2005). "An Historical Guide to the City of Dublin". Online book. Archived from the original on 31 October 2007.
- Lloyd, Ernest Marsh (1899). "Wellesley, Arthur" . In Lee, Sidney (ed.). Dictionary of National Biography. Vol. 60. London: Smith, Elder & Co. p. 170.
- Catherine Mary MacSorley: The Story of our Parish, 1917.
- John O'Donovan: Life by the Liffey
- Frank McDonald: The Destruction of Dublin, Gill and Macmillan 1985.
