= Robert Emmet =

Irish Republican, orator and secessionist (1778–1803)

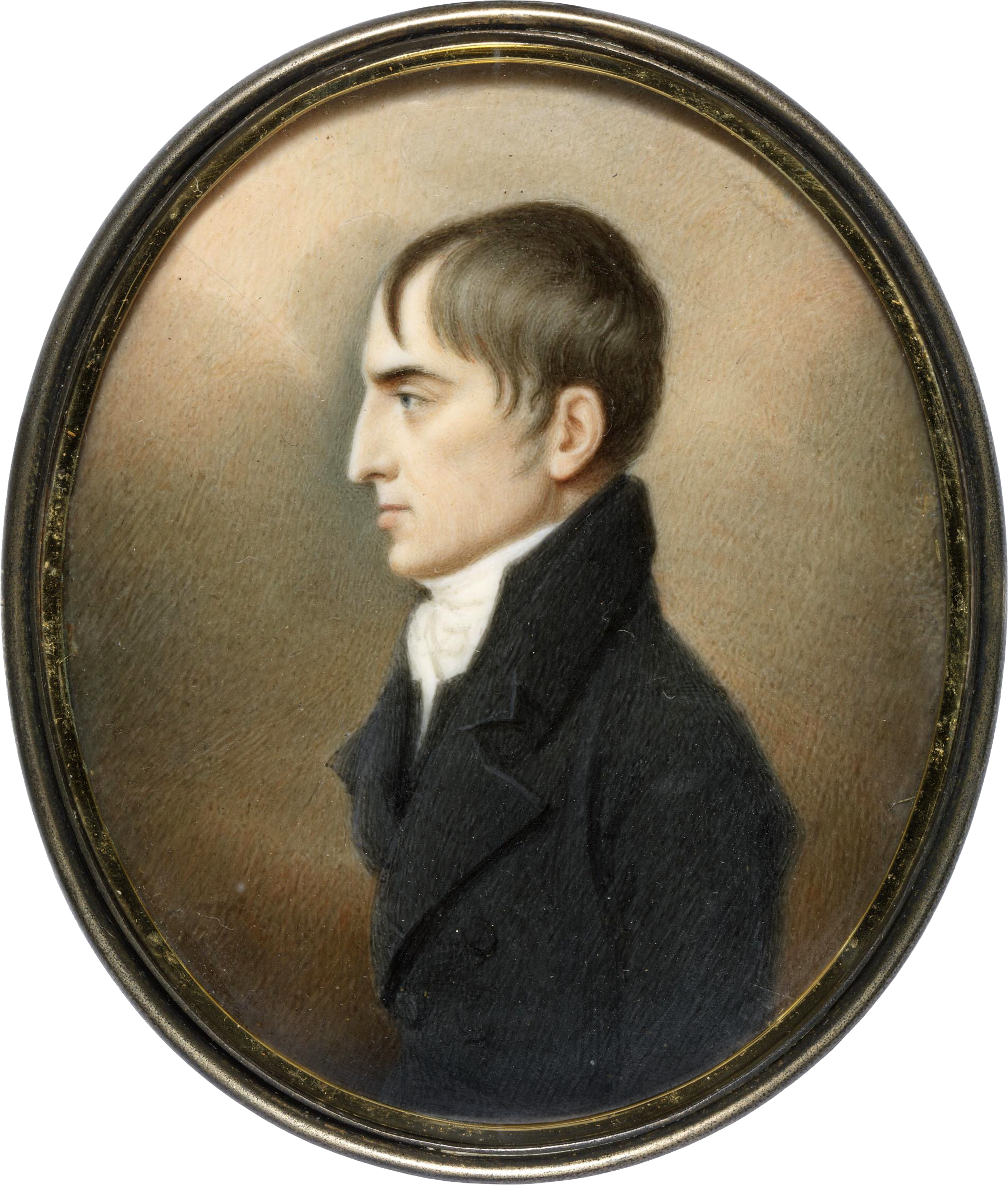
- A watercolour miniature of Emmet made during his trial.
- Born: 4 March 1778; Dublin, Ireland
- Died: 20 September 1803 (aged 25); Dublin, Ireland
- Cause of death: Execution by hanging
- Burial place: Unknown; possibly Bully's Acre, Dublin or St. Peter's Church, Aungier Street
- Education: Trinity College Dublin
- Partner: Sarah Curran (1802–1803)
- Relatives: Thomas Addis Emmet (brother); Christopher Temple Emmet (brother); Mary Anne Holmes (sister); Robert Holmes (brother-in-law); Elizabeth Emmet Lenox-Conyngham (niece)
- Military career
- Allegiance: United Irishmen
- Service years: 1793–1803
- Rank: Commander
- Commands: Irish Rebellion of 1803

Robert Emmet (4 March 1778 – 20 September 1803) was an Irish Republican, orator and rebel leader. Following the suppression of the United Irish uprising in 1798, he sought to organise a renewed attempt in Ireland to overthrow the British Crown and Protestant Ascendancy in Ireland, and to break the recently enforced union with Great Britain. Emmet entertained, but ultimately abandoned, hopes of immediate French assistance and of coordination with radical militants in Great Britain. In Ireland, many of the surviving veterans of '98 hesitated to lend their support, and his rising in Dublin in 1803 proved abortive.

Emmet’s Proclamation of the Provisional Government to the People of Ireland, his Speech from the Dock, and his "sacrificial" end on the gallows inspired later generations of Irish republicans. His memory was invoked by Patrick Pearse who in 1916 was again to proclaim a provisional government in Dublin.

== Early life ==
Emmet was born at 109 St. Stephen's Green, in Dublin on 4 March 1778. He was the youngest son of Robert Emmet (1729–1802), physician to the Lord Lieutenant, and his wife, Elizabeth Mason (1739–1803). The Emmets were financially comfortable, members of the Protestant Ascendancy with a house at St Stephen's Green and a country residence near Milltown.

Robert Emmet Sr. supported the cause of American independence and was a well-known figure on the fringes of the Irish patriot movement. Theobald Wolfe Tone, a friend of Emmet's elder brother, Thomas Addis Emmet, and an advocate of more radical reform, including Catholic Emancipation, was a visitor to the house. So too, as a friend of his father, was William Drennan, the original proposer of the "benevolent conspiracy--a plot for the people" that was to call itself, at Tone's suggestion, the Society of United Irishmen.

Robert Emmet was educated first at Oswald's School in Dapping Court, near Golden Lane, and then at the English grammar school of Samuel Whyte at 75 Grafton Street. One of his schoolmates was the poet, lyricist and squib writer Thomas Moore; Arthur Wellesley, the future Duke of Wellington, had been a pupil a few years earlier. After this he was tutored by the Rev Mr Lewis of Camden Street.

Emmet entered Trinity College Dublin in October 1793 as a precocious fifteen-year-old and excelled as a student of history and chemistry. In December 1797, he joined Thomas Moore in the College Historical Society. His brother Thomas and Wolfe Tone, preceding him in the society, maintained its lively tradition (stretching back to Edmund Burke) of defying the College's injunction against discussing questions of "modern politics".

Moore recalled that men "of advanced standing and reputation for oratory, came to attend our debates, expressly for the purpose of answering [Robert] Emmet". His eloquence was unmatched. In the preface to his Irish Melodies (1837), he recounts Emmet "ardently" taking the side of Democracy in the debate "Whether an Aristocracy or a Democracy is most favourable to the advancement of science and literature?". In "another of his remarkable speeches", he recalls Emmet saying, "When a people, advancing rapidly in knowledge and power, perceive at last how far their government is lagging behind them, what then, I ask, is to be done in such a case? What, but to pull the government up to the people?"

Robert Emmet is described by his contemporaries as slight in person; his features were regular, his forehead high, his eyes bright and full of expression, his nose sharp, thin, and straight, the lower part of his face slightly pock-marked, his complexion sallow.

== Separatist career ==
=== Emissary for the new United Irish Executive ===
In April 1798, Emmet was exposed as the secretary of a secret college committee in support of the Society of United Irishmen (of which his brother and Tone were leading executive members). Rather than submit to questioning under oath that might inculpate others, he withdrew from Trinity.

Emmet did not participate in the disordered United Irish uprising when it broke out the following month in counties to the south and north of the heavily-garrisoned capital. But after the suppression of the rebellion in the summer, and in communication with state prisoners held at Fort George in Scotland (including his brother), Emmet joined William Putnam McCabe in re-establishing a United Irish organisation. They sought to reconstruct the Society on a strict military basis, with its members chosen personally by its officers' meeting as the executive directorate. Following the example not only of Tone but also of James Coigly, their aim was to again solicit a French invasion on the prospective strength both of a rising in Ireland and of a radical conspiracy in Britain. To this end McCabe set out for France in December 1798, stopping first in London to renew contact with the network of English Jacobins, the United Britons.

On the new United Irish executive in Dublin, Emmet assisted veterans Thomas Wright (from April 1799, an informer) and Malachy Delaney (a former officer in the Austrian army), with a manual on insurgent tactics. In the summer of 1800, as secretary to Delaney, he set out on a secret mission to support McCabe's efforts in Paris. Through his foreign minister Talleyrand, Emmet and Delaney presented Napoleon with a memorial which argued that the parliamentary Union with Great Britain, imposed in the wake of the rebellion, had "in no way eased the discontent of Ireland", and with lessons drawn from the failure of '98, the United Irish were again prepared to act on the first news of a French landing.

Their request for an invasion force almost double that commanded by Hoche in the aborted 1796 Bantry expedition possibly told against them. The First Consul had other priorities: securing a temporary respite from war (the treaties of Lunéville in 1801 and of Amiens, March 1802) and re-enslaving Haiti.

=== Connection with English radicals and with France ===
In January 1802 the arrival in Dublin of William Dowdall, following his release from Fort George, injected new life into the United Irishmen, and by March, contact was re-established with the United Britons network in England. In July, McCabe, returning to Paris from a visit to Dublin, brought news to Manchester that the United Irishmen were ready to rise again as soon as the continental war was renewed. In this expectation, preparations in England were intensified, including in London where Edward Despard sought to enlist in the republican conspiracy soldiers of the guards' regiment stationed at Windsor and the Tower of London. In October, Emmet (one of the few in exile against whom charges were not pending in Ireland) was dispatched from Paris to assist Dowdall with the Dublin preparations.

In November 1802 the government moved on the conspirators in London. It did not discover the full extent of the plot, but the arrest of Despard and his execution in February 1803 may have weakened English support. Emmet's emissaries from Dublin found a cooler reception in London and the mill towns of Lancashire and Yorkshire than they had expected.

In May 1803 the war with France was renewed. McCabe appeared to enjoy Napoleon's favour, and had had assurances of his intention to help Ireland secure her independence. From his own interviews with Napoleon, and with Talleyrand, in the autumn of 1802, Emmet emerged unconvinced. He was persuaded that the First Consul was considering a Channel crossing for August 1803, but that in the contest with England there would be scant consideration for Ireland's interests. (Sympathetic to the cause, Denis Taaffe proposed that if ever France took possession of Ireland she would trade it for a West Indian sugar island).

Disputing with Arthur O'Connor, who in Paris insisted on a guarantee of a French landing, when war was resumed Emmet sent his own emissary, Patrick Gallagher, to Paris, to ask for "money, arms, ammunition and officers" but not for large numbers of troops. After the rising in Dublin misfired, and with no further prospects at home, in August Emmet did send Myles Byrne to Paris to do all he could to encourage an invasion. But at his trial, while he conceded that a "connection with France was, indeed, intended" it was to be "only as far as mutual interest would sanction require": no man should "calumniate" his memory by believing that he had "hoped for freedom from the government of France".

Michael Fayne, a Kildare conspirator, later testified that Emmet used talk of French assistance only to "encourage the lower orders of people", as he often heard him say that as bad as an English government was, it was better than a French one", and that his object was "an independent state brought about by Irishmen only".

=== Decision to proceed with a rising in Dublin ===
Emmet in Thomas Street, The Shamrock, Dublin, 1890

After his return to Ireland in October 1802, assisted by Anne Devlin (ostensibly his housekeeper), and with a legacy of £2,000 left to him by his father, Emmet laid preparations for a rising. According to the later recollection of Myles Byrne, on St Patrick's Day, 17 March 1803, Emmet gave a stirring speech to his confederates justifying the renewed resort to arms. If Ireland had cause in 1798, he argued it had only been compounded by the legislative union with Britain. As long as Ireland retained in its own parliament a "vestige of self-government", its people might entertain the hope of representation and reform. But now "in consequence of the accursed union":

[S]even-eights of the population have no right to send a member of their body to represent them, even in a foreign parliament, and the other eight part of the population are the tools and taskmasters, acting for the cruel English government and their Irish Ascendancy--a monster still worse, if possible than foreign tyranny.

In April 1803, James (Jemmy) Hope and Myles Byrne arranged conferences, at which Emmet promised arms, with Michael Dwyer (Devlin’s cousin), who still maintained a guerrilla resistance in the Wicklow Mountains, and with Thomas Cloney, a veteran of the Wexford rebellion in '98. Hope and Russell headed north to rouse the United veterans of Down and Antrim.

In Dublin, Emmet believed his hand was forced on the 16th of July when gunpowder in the rebel arms depot in Patrick Street accidentally detonated, arousing the suspicion of the authorities. He persuaded the majority of the leadership to bring forward the date for the rising to the evening of Saturday, July 23, a festival day, which would provide cover for the gathering of their forces. The plan, without any further consideration of French aid, was to storm Dublin Castle, make hostage of Privy Council, and signal the country to rise.

=== Moved by "a sinister hand"? ===
As preparations were made early in July, according to one of his many biographers, Helen Landreth, Emmet believed that "he had been tricked into the conspiracy", that he had been "a pawn moved by some sinister hand". Such may have been the suggestion of Hope's later remarks to the historian R. R. Madden. Emmet, according to Hope, realised that "the men of rank and fortune" who had urged him to head a new rising had had ulterior motives, but that, with Russell, he nonetheless placed his confidence in the great mass of the people to rise. This would have been despite Emmet's recognition that: "No leading Catholic is committed. We are all Protestants".

Parts of his plan were known, through spies and informers, to an undersecretary at Dublin Castle, Alexander Marsden and in turn by the Chief Secretary for Ireland, William Wickham. Yet they kept reports from the Lord Lieutenant and stayed the hand of the Town Major, Henry Sirr, who had wished to move against the rebels following the St. Patrick Street explosion.

Drawing on research in the 1880s by Thomas Addis Emmet of New York City, a grandson of Emmet's elder brother, Landreth believes that Marsden and Wickham conspired with William Pitt, then out of office but anticipating his return as Prime Minister, to encourage the most dangerously disaffected in Ireland to fatally compromise the prospects for an effective revolt by acting in advance of a French invasion. Landreth believes that Emmet was their unwitting instrument, drawn home from Paris for the purpose of organising a premature rising by the calculated misrepresentations of William Putnam McCabe and Arthur O'Connor. Her evidence, however, is circumstantial, relying not least on Pitt's reputed cynicism in accepting the prospect of a rebellion in 1798 in order to frighten the Irish Parliament into dissolving itself.

Emmet biographer, Patrick Geoghegan, finds it entirely "implausible" that Pitt, in or out of office, would risk the credibility of the union he had accomplished, and perhaps much else, for "some negligible security gains". He argues that Wickham was genuinely complacent and notes that, while he may have too long delayed moving against the rebels in the hope of discovering the full scope of their conspiracy, on the 23rd Marsden did sound the alarm in advance of the day's action. Madden, however, did suggest that the Orange-Ascendancy faction around Marsden, alarmed by Pitt's attempt to include Catholic emancipation in the Acts of Union, had hopes that insurrectionary attempt would harden British policy.

=== Proclamation of the Provisional Government ===
Emmet issued a proclamation in the name of the "Provisional Government". Calling upon the Irish people "to show the world that you are competent to take your place among the nations . . . as an independent country", Emmet made clear in the proclamation that they would have to do so "without foreign assistance": "That confidence which was once lost by trusting to external support . . . has been again restored. We have been mutually pledged to each other to look only to our own strength".

The Proclamation also contained "allusions to the widening of the political agenda of Emmet and the United Irishmen following the failure of 1798". In addition to democratic parliamentary reform, the Proclamation announced that tithes were to be abolished and the land of the established Church of Ireland nationalised. This, it has been suggested, marked the influence upon Emmet of Thomas Russell, although as a radical campaigner for economic and social reform, Russell might have wished to go further. Emmet remained intent on giving the rising a universal appeal across both class and sectarian divisions: "We are not against property – we war against no religious sect – we war not against past opinions or prejudices – we war against English dominion."

The Government sought to suppress all 10,000 printed copies of the Proclamation. Only two are known to survive.

=== The Rising ===
At 11 on the morning of 23 July 1803, Emmet showed men from Kildare an arsenal of pikes, grenades, rockets, and gunpowder-packed hollowed beams (these were to be dragged out onto the streets to prevent cavalry charges). They noted only the absence of recognisable firearms and were unimpressed by Emmet, a "youngster" whose inexperience would place "the rope around the neck of decent men". They left to turn back other Kildare insurgents on the road to Dublin. The plan to surprise Dublin Castle, and seize the viceroy, was botched when the assailants prematurely revealed themselves.

By evening Emmet, Malachy Delaney and Myles Byrne (turned out for the occasion in gold-trimmed green uniforms) were outside their Thomas Street arsenal – with just 80 men. R.R. Madden describes "a motley assemblage of armed men, a great number of whom were, if not intoxicated, under the evident excitement of drink". Unaware that John Allen was approaching with a band, according to one witness, of 300, and shaken by the sight of a lone dragoon being pulled from his horse and piked to death, Emmet told the men to disperse. He had already stood down sizeable insurgent groups straddling the main suburban roads by pre-arranged signal, a solitary rocket.

Sporadic clashes continued into the night. In one incident, the Lord Chief Justice of Ireland, Lord Kilwarden, was dragged from his carriage and stabbed by pikes. Found still alive, he was taken to a watch-house where he died shortly thereafter. Kilwarden had used his position to help his cousin, Wolfe Tone, to avoid prosecution in 1794. He was nonetheless reviled for the prosecution and hanging of William Orr in 1797 and, in the wake of 1798, of several Catholic Defenders. Kilwarden's nephew, the Rev. Mr Wolfe, was also killed, although his daughter was not harmed.

Emmet fled the city arriving in Rathfarnham with a party of 16 men. When he heard that Wicklow men were still planning to rise, he issued a countermanding order to prevent needless violence. Instead he ordered Byrne to Paris to again solicit the French.

== Capture, trial, and execution ==
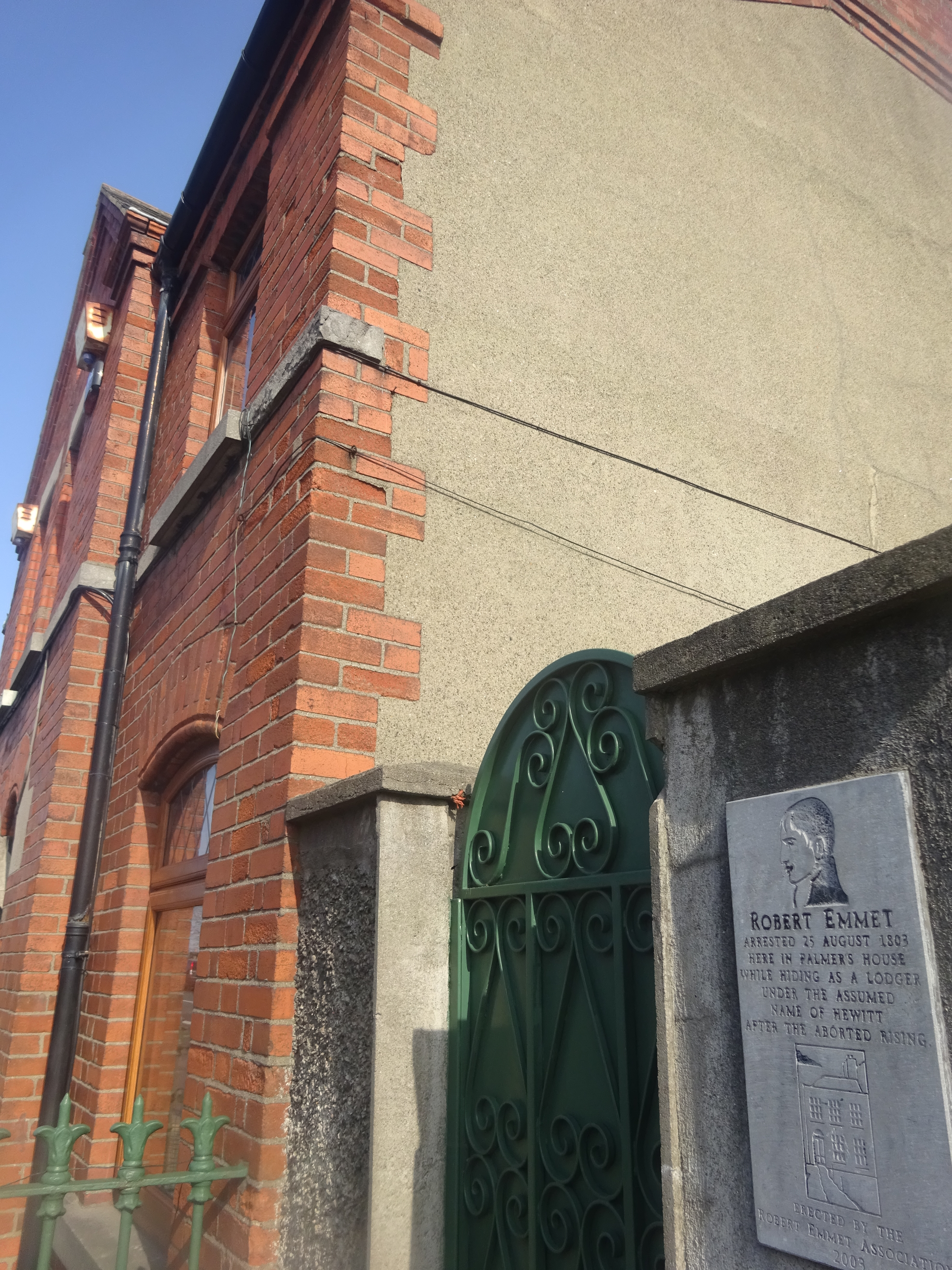
Site of Mrs. Palmer's house in Harold's Cross where Emmet was arrested, with memorial marker.

While Emmet hid in Rathfarnham, yeomen sought to extract information from Anne Devlin, prodding her with bayonets and half hanging her until she passed out. Had he not insisted on taking his leave of his fiancée Sarah Curran (daughter of the disapproving John Philpot Curran) he may have succeeded in joining Dowdall and Byrne in France. Emmet was captured on 25 August and taken to the Castle, then removed to Kilmainham. Vigorous but ineffectual efforts were made to procure his escape.

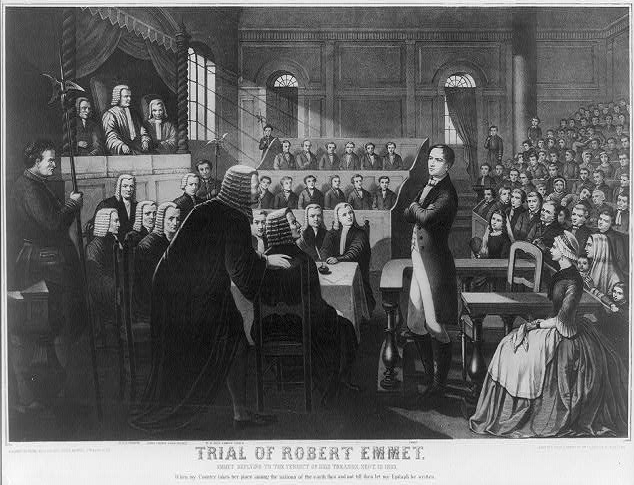
Depiction of Robert Emmet's trial

Emmet was tried and convicted for high treason on 19 September. The evidence against him had been overwhelming, but the Crown took the extra precaution of suborning his defence attorney, Leonard McNally, for £200 and a pension. McNally's assistant Peter Burrowes could not be bought and represented Emmet as best he could.

Emmet's instruction, however, was not to offer a defence: he would not call any witnesses, "or to take up the time of the court". When on announcing this, McNally proposed that the trial was concluded, the prosecuting counsel William Plunket took to his feet. In what was widely regarded as an unnecessary attack on a doomed man, Plunket, who was to see himself appointed Solicitor-General, mocked Emmet as the deluded leader of a conspiracy encompassing "the bricklayer, the old clothes man, the hodman and the hostler".

Emmet's Speech from the Dock is especially remembered for his closing remarks. Historian Patrick Geoghehan has identified over seventy different versions of the text, but in an early printing (1818) based on notes taken by Burrowes, Emmet concludes:

I am here ready to die. I am not allowed to vindicate my character; no man shall dare to vindicate my character; and when I am prevented from vindicating myself, let no man dare to calumniate me. Let my character and my motives repose in obscurity and peace, till other times and other men can do them justice. Then shall my character be vindicated; then may my epitaph be written.

Chief Justice Lord Norbury sentenced Emmet to be hanged, drawn and quartered, as was customary for conviction of treason. The following day, 20 September, Emmet was executed in Thomas Street in front of St. Catherine's. He was hanged and then beheaded once dead. As family members and friends of Robert had also been arrested, including some who had nothing to do with the rebellion, no one came forward to claim his remains out of fear of arrest. A plaster cast of Emmet's face taken "four hours after decapitation" was amongst a number of items sold at a Dublin auction in 1900.

On the eve of his execution, Emmet wrote from Kilmainham to the Chief Secretary for Ireland, William Wickham, whose "fairness" he acknowledged. He appears to have made a profound impression.

In December Wickham resigned his post, confessing to friends that "no consideration upon earth" could induce him "to remain after having maturely reflected" on the contents of the note he had received. He could not enforce laws "unjust, oppressive and unchristian" and intolerable to the memory of a man he had been "compelled by the duty of my office to pursue to the death". Wickham was persuaded that Emmet had been attempting to save Ireland from "a state of depression and humiliation" and that, had he himself been an Irishman, he "should most unquestionably have joined him".

== Burial and Shelley's later eulogy ==
Emmet's remains were first delivered to Newgate Prison and then back to Kilmainham Gaol, where the jailer was under instructions that if no one claimed them they were to be buried in a nearby hospital's burial grounds called Bully's Acre. Family tradition has it that in 1804, under cover of the burial of his sister, Mary Anne Holmes, Emmet's remains were removed from Bully's Acre and re-interred in the family vault (since demolished) at St Peter's Church in Aungier Street.

After searching for Emmet's grave in Dublin, early in 1812, Percy Bysshe Shelley revised his elegiac poem “The Monarch's Funeral: An Anticipation”: "For who was he, the uncoffined slain, /That fell in Erin's injured isle /Because his spirit dared disdain/ To light his country's funeral pile?" In "On Robert Emmet's Grave" Shelley proposed that, because unknown, Emmet's grave would "remain unpolluted by fame /Till thy foes, by the world and by fortune caressed, /Shall pass like a mist from the light of thy name."

When Shelley returned to London from Dublin in 1812, it was with an account of Emmet's trial containing his famous speech, and Emmet appears again as the “patriot” in The Devil's Walk, a lengthy broadside against a corrupt and un-reforming government. (At the same time, while in Dublin, Shelley had gone round streets and pubs of the city handing out An Address, to the Irish People, a 22-page pamphlet in which he pleaded with the Irish people not to repeat Emmet's attempt: "I do not wish to see things changed now, because it cannot be done without violence, and we may assure ourselves that none of us are fit for any change, however good, if we condescend to employ force in a cause we think right").

A search of the family vault at St Peter's Church in 1903 could not find Emmet's remains, and his actual burial place is still unknown, inspiring the phrase, "Do not look for him. His grave is Ireland."

== Legacy ==
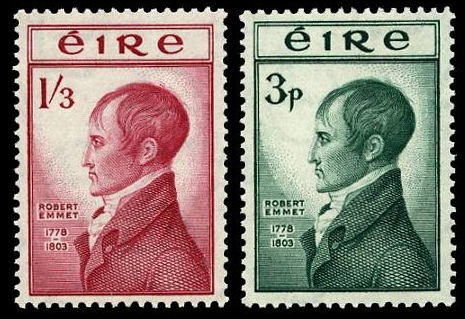
Robert Emmet was honoured on two Irish postage stamps issued in 1953, commemorating the 150th anniversary of his death

Emmet’s rebellion infuriated Lord Castlereagh because he "could not see the change that his own great measure the Union has effected in Ireland". Despite having so badly misfired, the 1803 rising suggested that the Act of Union was not going to be the palliative Castlereagh and Prime Minister William Pitt had intended. Castlereagh advised that "the best thing would be to go into no detail whatever upon the case, to keep the subject clearly standing on its own narrow base of a contemptible insurrection without means or respectable leaders", an instruction Plunket appears to have followed in Emmet's prosecution. This was to be a stance taken not only by unionists.

Daniel O'Connell who was to lead the struggle for Catholic Emancipation and for repeal of the Union in the decades following Emmet's death, roundly condemned the resort to "physical force". O'Connell's own programme of mobilising public opinion, fuelled by sometimes violent rhetoric and demonstrated in "monster meetings", might have suggested that constitutionalism and physical force were complementary rather than antithetical. But O'Connell remained content with his dismissal of Emmet in 1803 as an instigator of bloodshed who had forfeited any claim to "compassion".

Emmet's political rehabilitation begins in the Famine-years of the 1840s with the Young Irelanders. In 1846 they had finally broken with O'Connell declaring that if Repeal could not be carried by moral persuasion and peaceful means, a resort to arms would be "a no less honourable course". The Young Irelander publisher Charles Gavan Duffy repeatedly reprinted Michael James Whitty's popular chapbook Life, Trial and Conversations of Robert Emmet Esq. (1836), and promoted R.R. Madden's Life and Times of Robert Emmet (1847) which, despite its devastating account of the Thomas Street fiasco, was hagiographic.

In carrying forward the tradition of physical-force republicanism from the debacle of the Young Irelander "Famine Rebellion" in 1848, the Irish Republican Brotherhood (the Fenians) also carried forward admiration for Emmet. On the $20 bonds they issued in 1866 in the United States in the name of the Irish Republic, his profile appears opposite that of Tone.

Robert Emmet's older brother, Thomas Addis Emmet emigrated to the United States shortly after Robert's execution. He eventually served as the New York State Attorney General. His descendants (who included the prominent American portrait painters Lydia Field Emmet, Rosina Emmet Sherwood, Ellen Emmet Rand, and Jane Emmet de Glehn) helped advance his standing among the Irish diaspora, which in turn may have been one factor in ensuring that he was one among the "ghosts" invoked in the run-up to 1916 Easter Rising.

In the Emmet Commemoration speech he delivered in New York City in March 1914, Pearse described how the spirit of Irish patriotism called in Emmet "to a dreamer" and "awoke a man of action"; called to "a student and a recluse" and brought forth "a leader of men"; "called to one who loved the ways of peace" and found "a revolutionary". Emmet was a man unwilling to "surrender of one jot or shred of our claim to freedom even in return for all the blessings of the British peace". His attempt in 1803 was to be regarded, not as a failure but as "a triumph for that deathless thing we call Irish Nationality".

As Pearse parleyed with the British for terms at the end of Easter week, 1916, his Dublin commander James Connolly is recalled lying wounded in a house in Moore Street with a portrait of Emmet hanging over his bed.

== Representation in popular culture ==
Brandon Tynan's Robert Emmet, The Days of 1803. Chicago 1903

In a speech on Emmet in New York City in 1904, W. B. Yeats famously observed that "Emmet died and became an image". This was the work first, and foremost, of Thomas Moore. In his popular ballad "O! Breathe Not His Name", Moore made his former Trinity College friend the touchstone of national sentiment: "Oh breathe not his name! let it sleep in the shade, / Where cold and unhonoured his relics are laid! [...] / And the tear we shed, though secret it rolls, Shall keep his memory green in our souls". Dwelling upon the heartache of Sarah Curran, his "She is Far From the Land Where Her Young Hero Sleeps" also made Emmet an icon of romantic love.

In Irish America where, together with Emmet's Speech from the Dock, "O! Breathe Not His Name" became part of the canon of parochial education, Moore had innumerable imitators. Of these, one of the most ambitious was John Boyle O'Reilly, a member of the Irish Republican Brotherhood who had escaped from penal servitude in Western Australia. O'Reilly wrote a publicly performed eighty-four line poem, "The Patriot's Grave" (1878) in which he both echoes the defiance of Emmet's last words while attempting to bring the defence of physical force within a broader tradition that embraced constitutional agitation (to add Emmet to a Pantheon that included "Grattan, Flood and Curran"). Emmet was also a frequent character on the patriotic stage. Typical of his green-uniform presentation was Brandon Tynon's melodrama, Robert Emmet, the Days of 1803, which premiered on Broadway in 1902.

In the nineteenth century, the Emmet story also found its way into prose. On both sides of the Atlantic John Doherty's 1836 Life, Trial and Conversation and Times of Robert Emmet, and R. R. Madden's 1844 Life and Time of Robert Emmet became the standard references. With less patience for historical or political background, what tended to be drawn out in subsequent works was the notion of "pure sacrifice". In Robert Emmet, A Survey of his Rebellion and of His Romance (1904), Louise Imogen Guiney classes Emmet with Charlotte Corday and John Brown.

In the early twentieth century, Moore's Emmet appeared in pioneering film. While focusing on the Emmet-Curran love story, the 1911Thanhouser film (USA) Robert Emmet depicts Emmet's expulsion from Trinity College, his meeting with Napoleon, his part in the rising and his capture, trial and execution. Some of the same storyline features in Ireland a Nation (1914) written and produced in London and Ireland by Walter MacNamara, and Sidney Olcott's Bold Emmett Ireland's Martyr (1915, Sid Films, USA).

Many decades later there was a step away from hagiography. In her screen drama Anne Devlin (1984), the Irish feminist filmmaker Pat Murphy offers an implicit criticism of patriotic politics that operates "largely at the level of signs and representations". In one scene, Emmet enters a room as Devlin is holding up his splendid green uniform in front of a mirror. Asked what she thinks of it, Devlin (cousin of the guerrilla leader Michael Dwyer) replies that it looks like a green version of an English Redcoat, and will be seen "a mile off". "We should", she argues, "be rebel as ourselves’".

Emmet is "bold Robert" in the song Back Home in Derry, written by Bobby Sands in HM Prison Maze before his fatal hunger strike in 1981. The lyrics, describing the feelings of rebels convicts as leave Ireland for Australia, were recorded by Christy Moore.

== Honours ==
Places named after Emmet in the United States include Emmetsburg, Iowa; Emmet, Nebraska; Emmet County, Iowa; Emmett, Michigan and Emmet County, Michigan, and Emmet Street in the historic French neighborhood of Soulard, St. Louis. The Robert Emmet Elementary School in Chicago, Illinois was named for him. Two time All Ireland Club Camogie Champions Robert Emmet's GAC Slaughtneil is named after him, as is the Twin Cities Robert Emmet's Hurling Club in Minnesota. Emmet Park in Savannah, Georgia, was named after Emmet in 1902 in preparation for the centennial of his death.

Statues were erected in his honour:

- A life-size bronze statue of Robert Emmet by Jerome Connor stands in St Stephen's Green, Dublin, the parkland beside which Emmet was born. A copy stands in Emmetsburg, Iowa.
- A bronze statue of Emmet by Jerome Connor stands in Washington, DC on Embassy Row (Massachusetts Avenue NW and S Street NW). A public commemoration of Emmet's execution and legacy is held annually on the fourth Sunday in September by the Irish American Unity Conference.
- A copy of this statue was installed on the Music Concourse in front of the California Academy of Sciences in San Francisco's Golden Gate Park.
- A statue of Robert Emmet is in the courthouse square in Emmetsburg, Iowa.
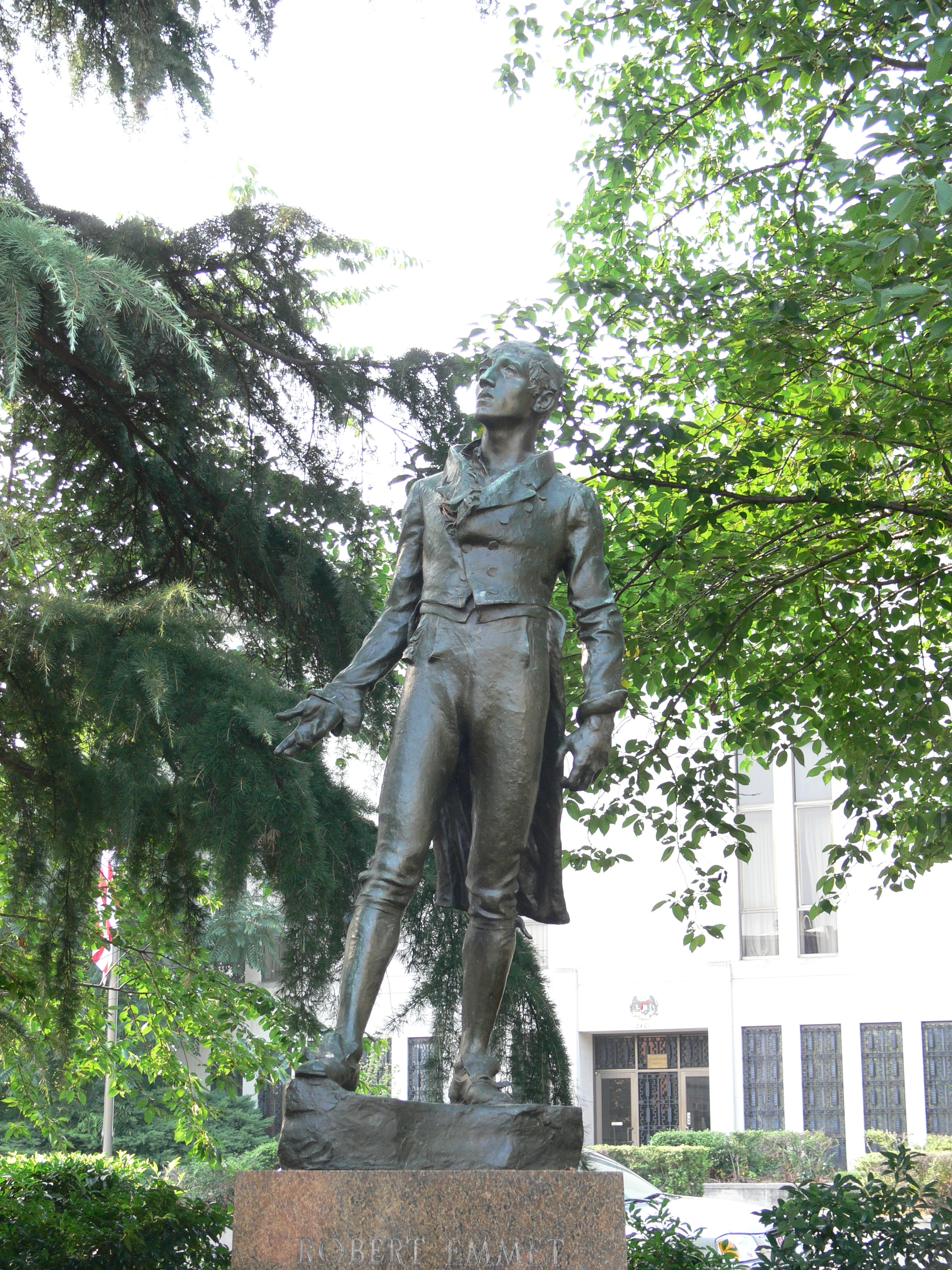
Bronze statue of Robert Emmet, 1916, by Jerome Connor, from the collection of the Smithsonian American Art Museum. It is installed in Washington, DC's Embassy Row.

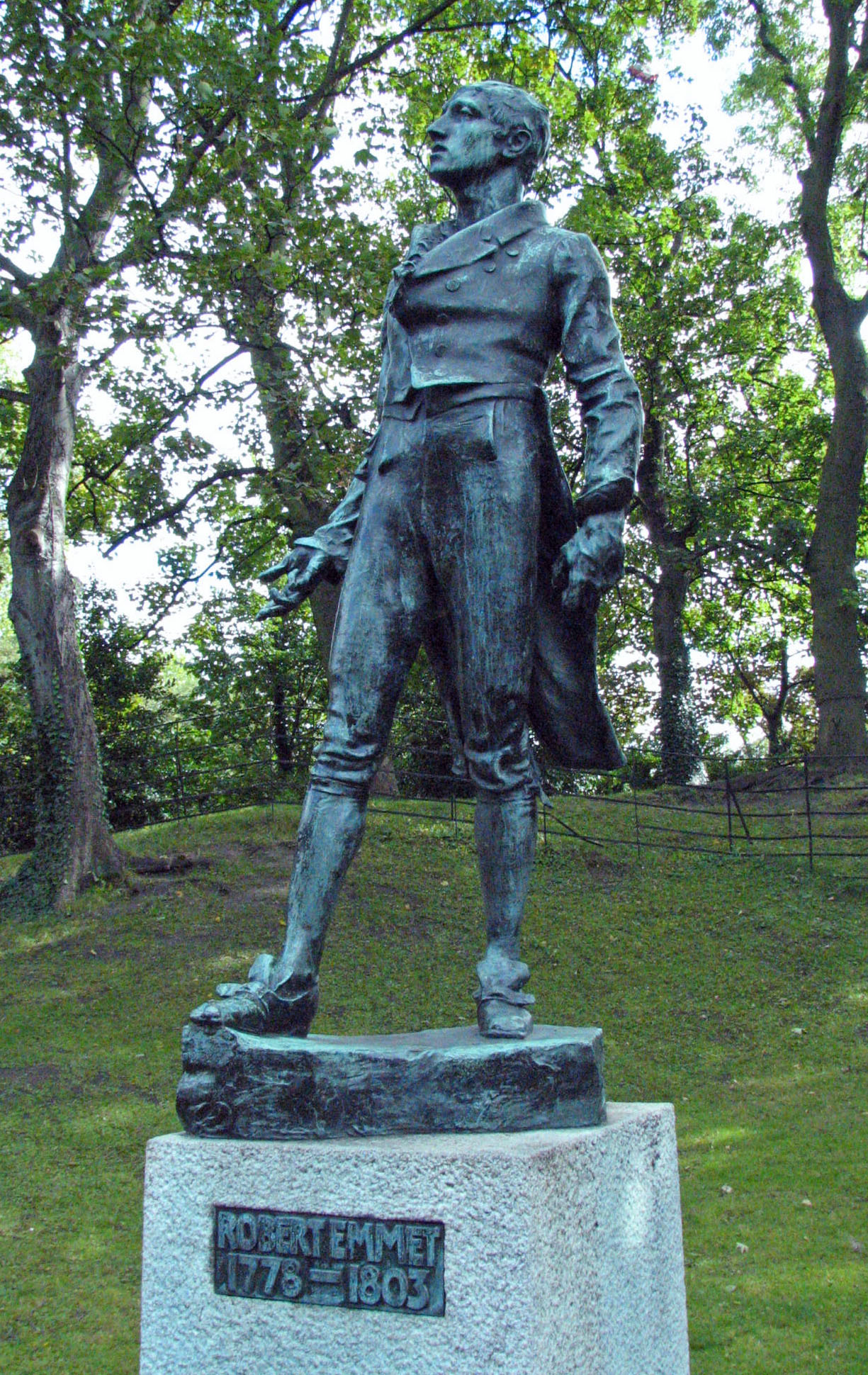
Statue of Robert Emmet in St Stephens Green, Dublin

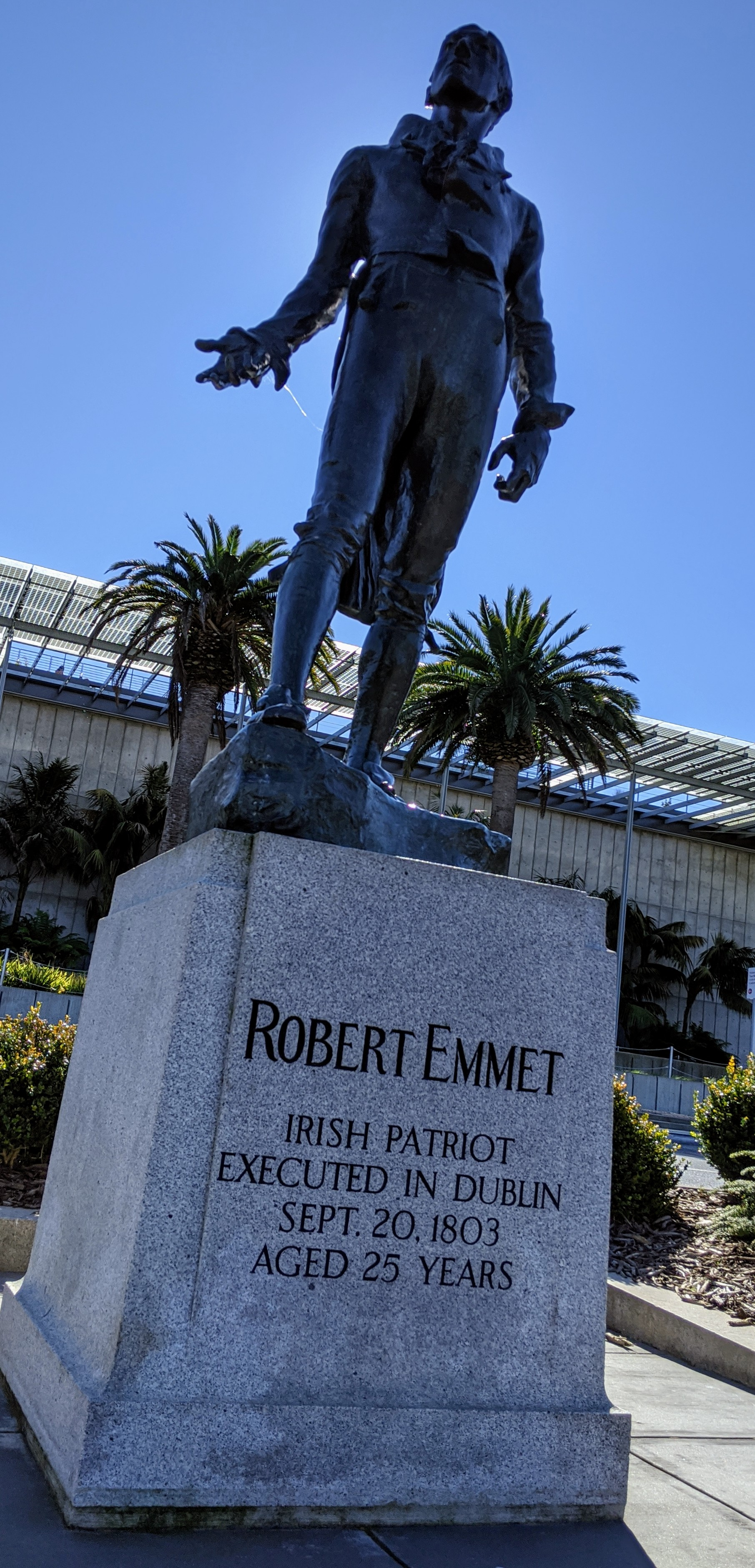
Reproduction of Robert Emmet statue in San Francisco's Golden Gate Park

== See also ==
- Despard Plot
- Irish Rebellion of 1803
- John Allen
- Thomas Russell
- List of monuments and memorials to the Irish Rebellion of 1803
