= Peter Crompton =

English physician, political radical and brewer

- Born: 1765; Derby
- Died: 23 January 1833
- Occupations: physician; political radical; brewer
- Spouse: Mary Crompton
- Parent(s): Joshua Crompton; Elizabeth Colthurst

Peter Crompton (1765 – 23 January 1833) was an English physician, political radical and brewer.

== Early life ==
Crompton was from a Derby family, the third son of Joshua Crompton (died 1770), a banker there, and his wife Elizabeth Colthurst. He attended Warrington Academy from 1781, and was given some early medical training. He went on to become a medical student at the University of Edinburgh and the University of Leyden. In Leyden he shared lodgings with Robert Darwin.

On the death of his elder brother, Crompton came into property, and in the end did not pursue medicine as a profession. He did give free medical care to the poor. Family properties included the manor of Mapplewell at Woodhouse Eaves in Leicestershire, acquired by Joshua Crompton.

== The Derby Addresses and societies ==
The "Derby Address" of September 1791 from the Derby Philosophical Society, of which Crompton was a member, was signed by Erasmus Darwin, and was sent to Joseph Priestley, as a reaction to the Birmingham "King and Country" riots of July that year. The issue was divisive in the society, and resulted in the expulsion of the Rev. Charles Hope, vicar of St Michael and St Werburgh, Derby.

It was followed by a radical declaration of July 1792. It is printed as Appendix A by Jenny Graham in volume II of her work on British radicalism 1789–1799, in the form of an address "To the Friends of Free Enquiry, and the General Good", signed "S. Eyre" and given at a Derby meeting of the Society for Political Information.

In early 1792, Crompton was one of the founders of the Derby Constitutional Society, or Derby Society for Political Information, with Joseph Strutt and others including Darwin, Samuel Fox of Derby (see below), and William Ward who edited the Derby Mercury newspaper 1789–1791. They distributed works of Tom Paine. Crompton chaired the meeting at which the second Derby Address, written by Henry Redhead Yorke and William Brooks Johnson, was approved to be sent to the National Constituent Assembly in France. Yorke, who had recently written a pro-slavery pamphlet, at this time reversed his position and wrote an abolitionist answer to it; he was more radical than the generally moderate Derby reformers, such as Ward. The Derby society joined in the "Address to the National Convention of France" of November 1792, largely the work of the London Corresponding Society.

The second address was printed as a pamphlet in 1793. It was reprinted by Thomas Spence in his Pig's Meat, around 1795.

== Political campaigning ==
In the 1796 general election, Crompton stood as a candidate for Nottingham, receiving the most "plumper" votes in a three-cornered contest, but coming third behind the Tory Robert Smith and the Whig Daniel Coke. He built up a base there, and stood again in 1807 and 1812.

In a successful political ambush, Crompton, by then a member of the reforming Liverpool Concentric Society, with Dr. Taylor of Bolton, had alternative motion passed at an 1817 meeting called at Preston, Lancashire by the Tory High Sheriff of Lancashire, Robert Townley Parker. It blamed the Liverpool administration for "a degree of misery never before experienced" in the country. The Concentric Society were allied locally to Egerton Smith and the Liverpool Mercury, and nationally to Francis Burdett.

In 1818, having failed three times to be elected at Nottingham, Crompton recommended Joseph Birch to his supporters. Birch was elected, and held the seat to 1830. From that time Crompton associated with John Wood, who supported him in unsuccessful campaigns at Preston in 1818, and in 1820 at Liverpool. Wood himself was elected at Preston in 1826, Crompton supporting him amid violent scenes involving followers of William Cobbett.

== At Eton House ==
Crompton moved to Eton House, near Liverpool, in 1797. He had a business interest in a brewery there, set up with the Irish market in mind. He was a founder of the Liverpool Literary Society, with James Currie, William Rathbone IV and William Roscoe.

== Later life ==
Peter Crompton died on 23 January 1833, aged 68.

== Associations ==
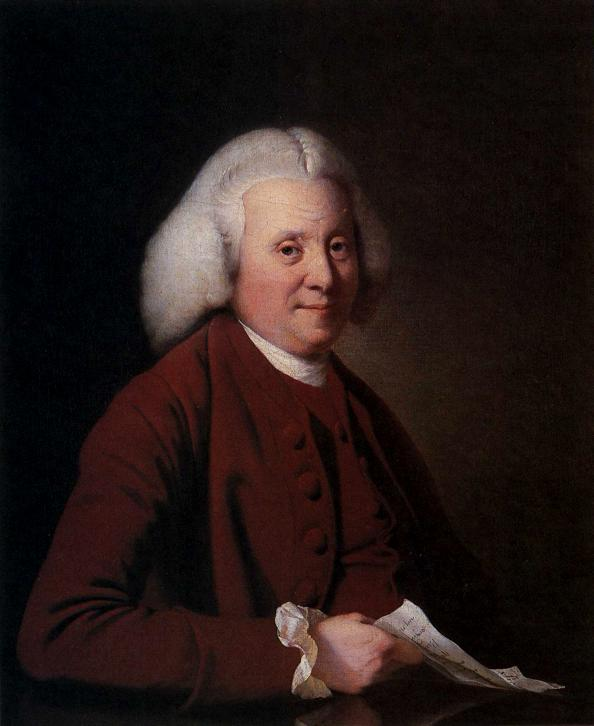
Samuel Crompton (1714–1782), portrait by Joseph Wright of Derby

Samuel Crompton (1714–1782), the Derby banker and Peter Crompton's uncle, was involved in the Strutt family circle, an influential Unitarian grouping around the children of Jedediah Strutt. The Derby Constitutional Society was connected to Tom Paine though the Strutt family and business. Samuel Fox of Derby (1765–1851) was a hosier and Unitarian, married to Martha Strutt (his first wife), sister of Joseph and William Strutt. He was an associate of William Strutt, who had a practical interest in Paine's iron bridge for local construction work on the River Derwent. Fox called on Paine in London in 1791.

In terms of the "overlapping provincial communities of reformers", Crompton's role has been described as central. He became a patron and friend of John Thelwall. Contacts he had in common with Thelwall included William Hawes and his daughter Maria, married to John Gurney, Joseph and Willam Strutt, and Elizabeth Evans, another Strutt sister (see below), William Shepherd and Gilbert Wakefield. In 1798, he introduced Shepherd to Jeremiah Joyce, in Hackney, then a village to the east of London. In 1799, when Wakefield was imprisoned, his children went to Shepherd, but one of the daughters stayed with Crompton.

In 1796 Crompton approached Samuel Taylor Coleridge with plans to set up a private school in Derby. It might have amounted to having Coleridge tutor his young sons; and arose in connection with another tutoring proposal from Elizabeth Evans of Darley, widowed sister of Joseph Strutt. Elizabeth, mother of William Evans (1788–1856), had lost her banker husband William Evans that year. Crompton brought into his household Sarah Lawrence as governess, who held this position for a number of years.

The Unitarian congregation in Derby, which included Joseph and William Strutt, met at the Friar Gate Chapel. The minister there from 1798 to 1803, was William Winstanley (1772–1852), a physician and a good friend of Crompton. He later, as Crompton did, belonged in Liverpool to the Roscoe circle.

== Works ==
- To the Independent Electors, of the Town and County, of the Town of Nottingham (1796)
- To the Independent Electors, of the Town and County of the Town of Nottingham (1807)

== Family ==
In 1787 at age 21 Crompton married Mary Crompton (born 1759), a second cousin, daughter of John Crompton of Crompton Hall. Mary attended some of the 1794 Treason Trials, hearing Thomas Erskine defend John Horne Tooke. She became a close friend of Coleridge. Their children were:

- Edward Crompton, unmarried, died 1853 at Mapplewell aged 65.
- Henry Crompton, unmarried
- Charles John Crompton (born 1797) was the third son. He married in 1832 Caroline Fletcher, fourth daughter of Thomas Fletcher of Liverpool (1767–1850).
- Albert Crompton, barrister-at-law, died unmarried 1841
- Stamford Crompton
- Caroline Crompton, married in 1821 Robert Hutton
- Emma Crompton
