= Christopher Temple Emmet =

Irish barrister and poet

C. Temple Emmet
- Born: 1761; Cork
- Died: February 1, 1788 (aged 26–27)
- Occupations: Barrister, poet
- Relatives: Thomas Addis Emmet (brother); Mary Anne Emmet (sister)

Christopher Temple Emmet (1761 – February 1788) was an Irish barrister and poet, born into a well-connected but politically radical, Ascendancy family.

== Early life ==
Emmet was born at Cork in 1761. He was the eldest son of Elizabeth (née Mason) Emmet (1740–1803) and Robert Emmet, M.D. (1729–1802), a state physician and physician to the viceregal household.

His younger brothers were, in the decade following his death, United Irishmen: Thomas Addis Emmet, forced into exile after the Rebellion of 1798, and Robert Emmet, executed for his role in attempting to renew the republican insurrection with a rising in Dublin in 1803. His younger sister was the poet and writer Mary Anne Holmes, the wife of fellow barrister Robert Holmes.

The Emmets had been financially comfortable, members of the Protestant Ascendancy with a house at St Stephen's Green and a country residence near Milltown. Christopher Emmet entered Trinity College Dublin in 1775, and obtained a scholarship there in 1778.

== Career ==
He was called to the bar in Ireland in 1781. Emmet attained eminence as an advocate; he possessed a highly poetical imagination, remarkably retentive memory, and a vast amount of acquired knowledge of law, divinity, and literature. Under the chancellorship of Lord Lifford, Emmet was advanced to the rank of King's Counsel in 1787.

=== Works ===
Emmet's only known writings are a short poem on the myrtle and other trees, and an allegory of thirty-two stanzas of four lines each, entitled The Decree. The latter was written during the administration of, and inscribed to, the Earl of Buckinghamshire, viceroy of Ireland from 1777 to 1780. In these verses Emmet predicted that England's future eminence would be endangered unless she acted justly towards Ireland by annulling harsh laws, and by removing the enactments prohibiting commerce between the Irish and America, which he styled 'the growing western world.'

== Personal life ==
In 1781, he married his second cousin, Anne Western Shirley Temple, daughter of Harriet (née Shirley) Temple and Robert Temple, an American loyalist who had settled in Ireland.

Emmet died in February 1788, while he was on circuit in the south of Ireland, and his widow died in the following November. After his death, his younger brother Thomas Addis Emmet decided to study law at the Inner Temple in London and was later admitted to the Irish bar in 1790.

== See also ==
- List of Bishop's College School alumni
