= Robert Holmes (barrister) =

Irish lawyer and nationalist

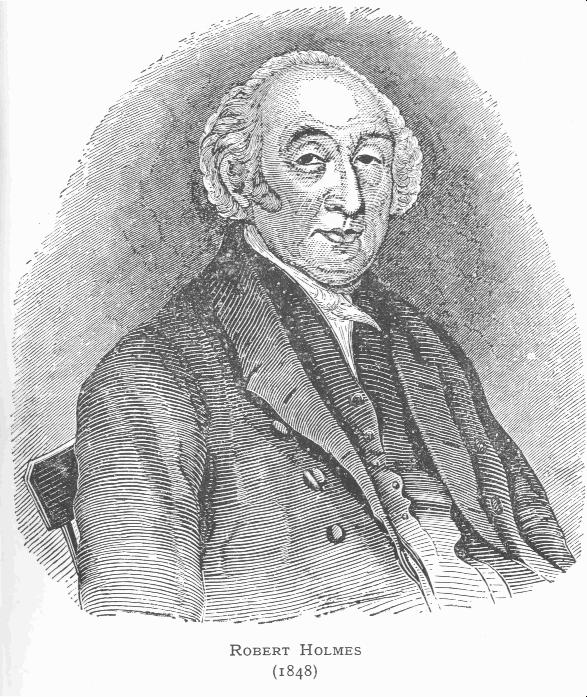
Image of Robert Holmes from Michael Doheny's The Felon's Track

Robert Holmes (1765 – 7 October 1859) was an Irish lawyer and nationalist.

== Early life ==
Holmes was born in Dublin in 1765, the son of parents who were natives of Antrim and settled at Belfast. He was born during his parents' visit to Dublin in 1765. He entered Trinity College, Dublin in 1782, and graduated B.A. in 1787. He at first devoted himself to medicine, but he soon turned his attention to the law. In 1795 he was called to the bar. He spent a substantial period of his professional life travelling the north-east circuit in Ireland, where he gained a reputation for great ability and legal skill.

He studied law and became one of the best known defenders of the Nationalist Leaders in Ireland. He spoke in 1846 in defence of Charles Gavan Duffy, editor of The Nation. Duffy had been indicted over an article written by John Mitchel, which came to be known as the "Railway Article". Holmes' defence proved successful, and his speech on behalf of his client was described by Chief Justice Edward Pennefather as "the most eloquent ever heard in a court of Justice".

In 1798, during a parade of the lawyers corps of yeomanry, of which he was a member, Holmes threw down his arms on learning that the corps was to be placed under the military authorities, dreading that he might have to act against the populace. To one Joy, a barrister, who had used insulting language to him respecting this circumstance, he sent a challenge, for which he suffered three months' imprisonment. In 1799 he published a satirical pamphlet on the projected act of union, entitled A Demonstration of the Necessity of the Legislative Union of Great Britain and Ireland. With the rising of his brother-in-law, Robert Emmet, on 23 July 1803, he had no connection, although he was arrested on suspicion and imprisoned for some months. This retarded his advancement. He declined to receive any favours from the government, refusing in succession the offices of crown prosecutor, king's counsel, and solicitor-general, and to the last he remained a member of the outer bar.

He had for many years the largest practice of any member of the Irish courts, and was listened to with attention by judges, although he was not always very civil to them. His law arguments formed an important set of articles in the Irish Law Reports, and he was an impressive advocate, notably in his speeches in Watson v. Dill, in defence of the Nation newspaper, and his oration on behalf of John Mitchel, tried for treason-felony on 24 May 1848. During the course of his practice he made over £100,000.

== Family ==
Holmes married, firstly, Mary Anne Emmet, daughter of Dr. Robert Emmet. She was the sister of Robert Emmet, who led an unsuccessful rebellion in 1803, and whose brother, Thomas Addis Emmet, was a leading member, with Wolfe Tone, of the United Irishmen; both took part in the Rebellion of 1798. The marriage produced one surviving child, a daughter, who later married George William Lenox-Conyngham, chief clerk of the Foreign Office, and in turn had an only daughter who in 1851 married Viscount Doneraile.

Holmes married in 1810 at Childwall, as his second wife, the English educator and writer Eliza Lawrence. She died in 1811.

After his retirement in 1852, he resided in London with his only child, Elizabeth. He died at her home, 37 Eaton Place, Belgrave Square, London, aged 94.

== Works ==
During the course of his life, Holmes was the author of three published works: the first, published in 1799, was entitled "A Demonstration of the Necessity of the Legislative Union of Great Britain and Ireland", a satirical pamphlet ridiculing the arguments of its supporters. The next was "An Address to the Yeomanry of Ireland, demonstrating the necessity of their declaring their opinions upon Political Subjects." His most important work, however, according to Peter Aloysius Sillard, was "The Case of Ireland Stated," which apparently went through six editions, the last in 1847.
