= Thomas Addis Emmet =

Irish born American lawyer and politician (1764–1827)

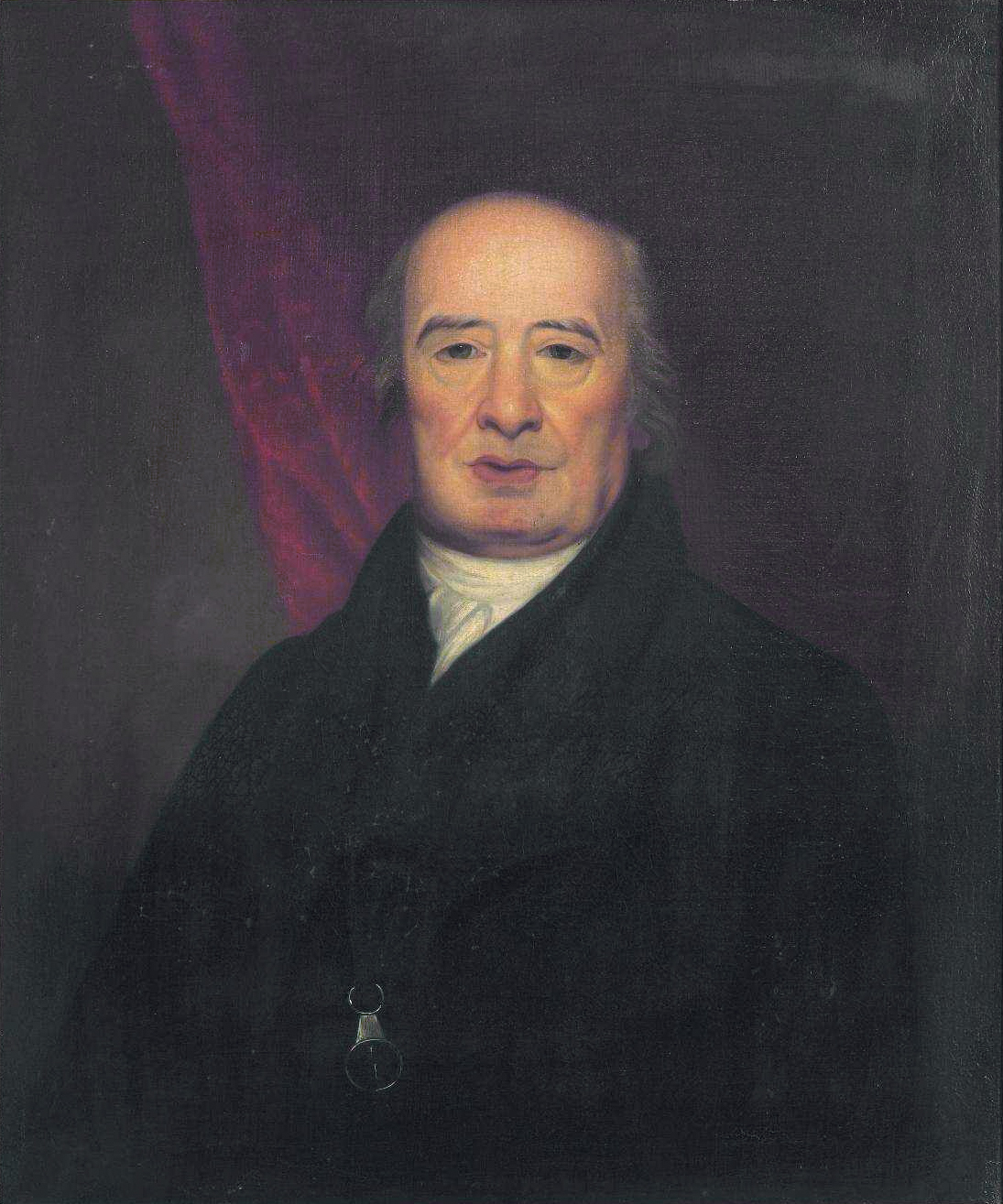
- Portrait by Samuel F. B. Morse, c. 1820

Attorney General of New York
- In office 1812–1813
- Preceded by: Matthias B. Hildreth
- Succeeded by: Abraham Van Vechten
- Constituency: New York County, New York

Personal details
- Born: 24 April 1764 Cork, Ireland
- Died: 14 November 1827 (aged 63)
- Party: Democratic-Republican
- Other political affiliations: United Irishmen
- Spouse: Jane Patten (after 1791)
- Relatives: Christopher Emmet (brother); Robert Emmet (brother); Mary Anne Holmes (sister)
- Education: Trinity College Dublin; University of Edinburgh

Thomas Addis Emmet (24 April 1764 – 14 November 1827) was an Irish and American lawyer and politician. In Ireland, in the 1790s, he was a senior member of the Society of United Irishmen as it planned for an insurrection against the British Crown and Protestant Ascendancy. In American exile, he took up legal practice in New York, earned a reputation as a staunch abolitionist, and in 1812 to 1813 served as the state's Attorney General.

== Early life ==
Thomas Addis Emmet was born in the Hammond's Marsh area of Cork on 24 April 1764. He was a son of Dr. Robert Emmet from Tipperary town (later to become State Physician of Ireland) and Elizabeth Mason of County Cork, both of whose portraits are today displayed at Cork's Crawford Art Gallery. He was the elder brother of Robert Emmet, who was executed for leading the Irish Rebellion of 1803, becoming one of Ireland's most famous Republican martyrs. His sister, Mary Anne Holmes, held similar political beliefs.

Emmet was educated at Trinity College, Dublin and was a member of the committee of the College Historical Society. He later studied medicine at the University of Edinburgh and was a pupil of Dugald Stewart in philosophy. After visiting the chief medical schools on the continent, he returned to Ireland in 1788; but the sudden death of his elder brother, Christopher Temple Emmet (1761–1788), a student of great distinction, induced him to follow the advice of Sir James Mackintosh to forsake medicine for the law as a profession.

== United Irishman ==
Emmet was a man of liberal political sympathies and became involved with the campaign to extend the democratic franchise for the Irish Parliament and to end discrimination against Catholics. He was called to the Irish bar in 1790 and quickly obtained a practice, principally as counsel for prisoners charged with political offences. This including defending James Napper Tandy. He also became the legal adviser of the Society of the United Irishmen, which included Tandy as a member.

When the Dublin Corporation issued a declaration of support of the Protestant Ascendancy in 1792, the response of the United Irishmen was their non-sectarian manifesto, which was largely drawn up by Emmet. In 1795 he formally took the test or pledge of the United Irishmen (composed by his friend, William Drennan), becoming secretary in the same year and a member of the executive in 1797. By this time, the United Irishmen had been declared illegal and driven underground. Efforts to secure Catholic emancipation and parliamentary reform were abandoned in favour of preparations for a republican insurrection. At odds with Lord Edward Fitzgerald and other leading members, Emmet cautioned against proceeding in advance of a French landing.

British intelligence had infiltrated the United Irishmen and managed to arrest most of their leaders on the eve of the rebellion. Though not among those taken at the house of Oliver Bond on 12 March 1798 (see Lord Edward Fitzgerald), he was arrested about the same time, and was one of the leaders imprisoned initially at Kilmainham Jail and later in Scotland at Fort George until 1802. Upon his release, he went to Brussels where he was visited by his brother Robert Emmet in October 1802 and was informed of the preparations for a fresh rising in Ireland in conjunction with French aid. However, at that stage, France and Britain were briefly at peace, and the Emmets' pleas for help were turned down by Napoleon.

He received news of the failure of Robert Emmet's rising in July 1803 in Paris, where, because of his alleged Jacobin sympathies and complaints regarding broken French promises, he had lost out to Arthur O'Connor as the favoured Irish emissary. Disillusioned with Napoleon's new imperial regime, and convinced that if it invaded Ireland it would reduce it to another of its client states, on 4 October 1804 he sailed with his family for America.

On his arrival, he wrote to Robert Simms in Belfast: "France is the headquarters of fraud, deceit, despotism and under its present rulers no Nation or People who love liberty need look for its honest cooperation".

== Abolitionist attorney in New York ==
Emmet was urged to consider settling in the American South by Joseph McCormick, who had been imprisoned with him in Fort George and who eventually became a slaveholder in Georgia. Instead, protesting his "insuperable objection" to slavery, Emmet set up a legal practice in New York City and became involved with the abolitionist Society of Friends (the Quakers). In his first case he represented a fugitive slave, and in 1805, in a case against a ship's captain, under the federal laws against the slave trade, secured an unprecedented victory for the New York Manumission Society. Emmet (alongside fellow exile, William Sampson) continued counselling and representing the Society, without pay, until his death in 1827.

In August 1812, following the death of Matthias B. Hildreth, Emmet was appointed New York State Attorney General. Aligned, despite his uncompromising abolitionism, with the Democratic Republican Party, he was removed from office in February the following year when the Federalist Party (who had objected to his original admission to the New York bar) obtained a majority in the Council of Appointment.

His abilities and successes became so acclaimed, and his services so requested, that he became one of the most respected attorneys in the nation, with United States Supreme Court Justice Joseph Story declaring him to be "the favourite counsellor of New York." He argued the case for Ogden in the landmark United States Supreme Court case of Gibbons v. Ogden, 22 U.S. 1 (1824) relating to the Commerce Clause and Supremacy Clause of the United States Constitution. The has since provided the basis for Congress' regulation of railroads, freeways and television and radio broadcasts. Other cases Emmet argued before the Supreme Court included Sixty Pipes of Brandy (23 U.S. 421) and The Schooner Andeline (13 U.S. 244).

== Personal life, descendants ==
He married Jane Patten (1771–1846), a daughter of John Patten and Jane (née Colville) Patten, in 1791. Together, they were the parents of:

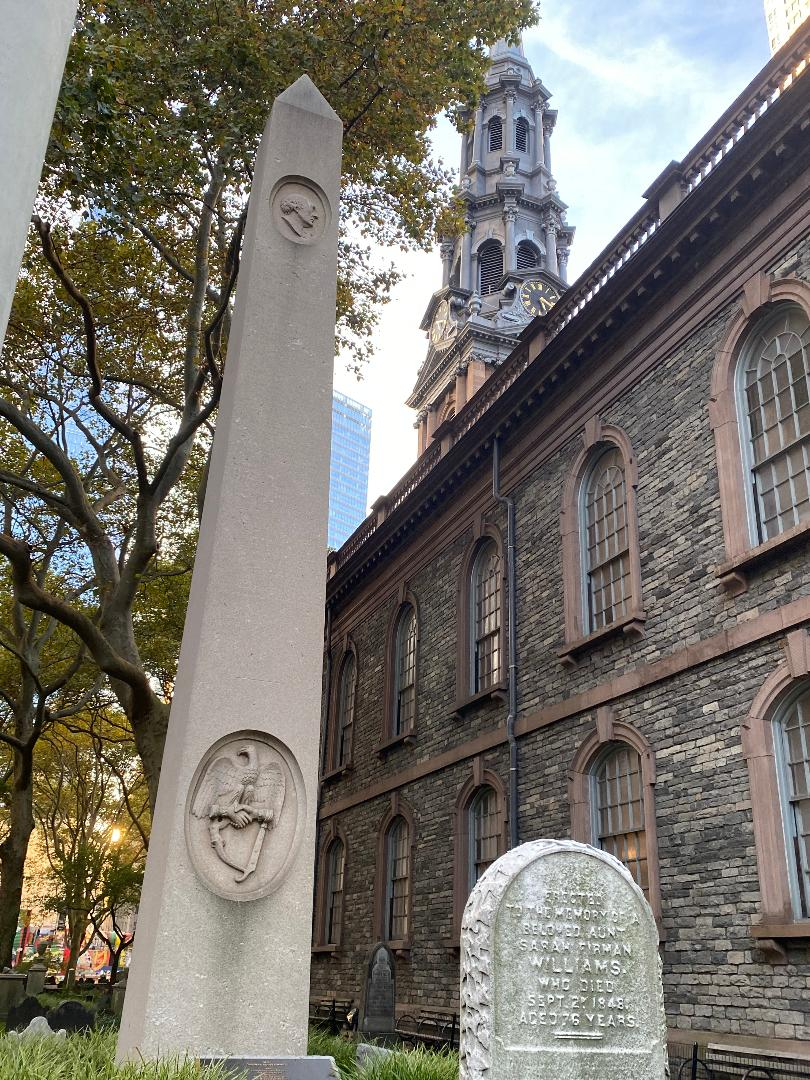
Thomas Addis Emmet memorial obelisk, St. Paul's Chapel, Lower Manhattan, New York City

- Robert Emmet, who was born in Dublin and became a prominent New York jurist and Irish American activist.
- Elizabeth Emmet (1794–1878), who married William Henry LeRoy (1795–1888), a son of Herman LeRoy and brother-in-law of Daniel Webster.
- Margaret Emmet (1794–1883), who did not marry.
- John Patten Emmet (1795–1842), who married Mary Byrd Tucker (1805–1860) in 1827; their daughter, Jane Emmet, married merchant John Noble Alsop Griswold.
- Thomas Addis Emmet (1797–1863), who married Anna Riker Thom (1805–1886), daughter of John Thom and Jane Margaret Riker.
- Jane Erin Emmet (1802–1890), who married Bache McEvers in 1825. Their daughter Mary Bache McEvers married Sir Edward Cunard, 2nd Baronet (son of Sir Samuel Cunard, 1st Baronet, founder of the Cunard Line).

Samuel F. B. Morse painted a famous portrait of Emmet that Maxwell kept. Upon Maxwell's death in 1873, he left the painting to the New York Law Institute, which was exhibited in the National Portrait Gallery and was auctioned by Sotheby's in 2010.

Through his son Robert, he was a grandfather of another prominent New York jurist and attorney general, Richard Stockton Emmet (himself the father of Richard S. Emmet Jr.), and great-grandfather of the notable American portrait artist sisters Rosina Emmet Sherwood, Lydia Field Emmet and Jane Emmet de Glehn, as well as their first cousin Ellen Emmet Rand. Rosina's twin brother was West Point graduate and Medal of Honor winner Robert Temple Emmet. He is the great-great-grandfather of the playwright Robert Emmet Sherwood. His direct descendant, French human rights lawyer Valentin Ribet, died aged 26 in the terrorist attack on the Bataclan in Paris on Friday 13 November 2015.

=== Death and commemoration ===
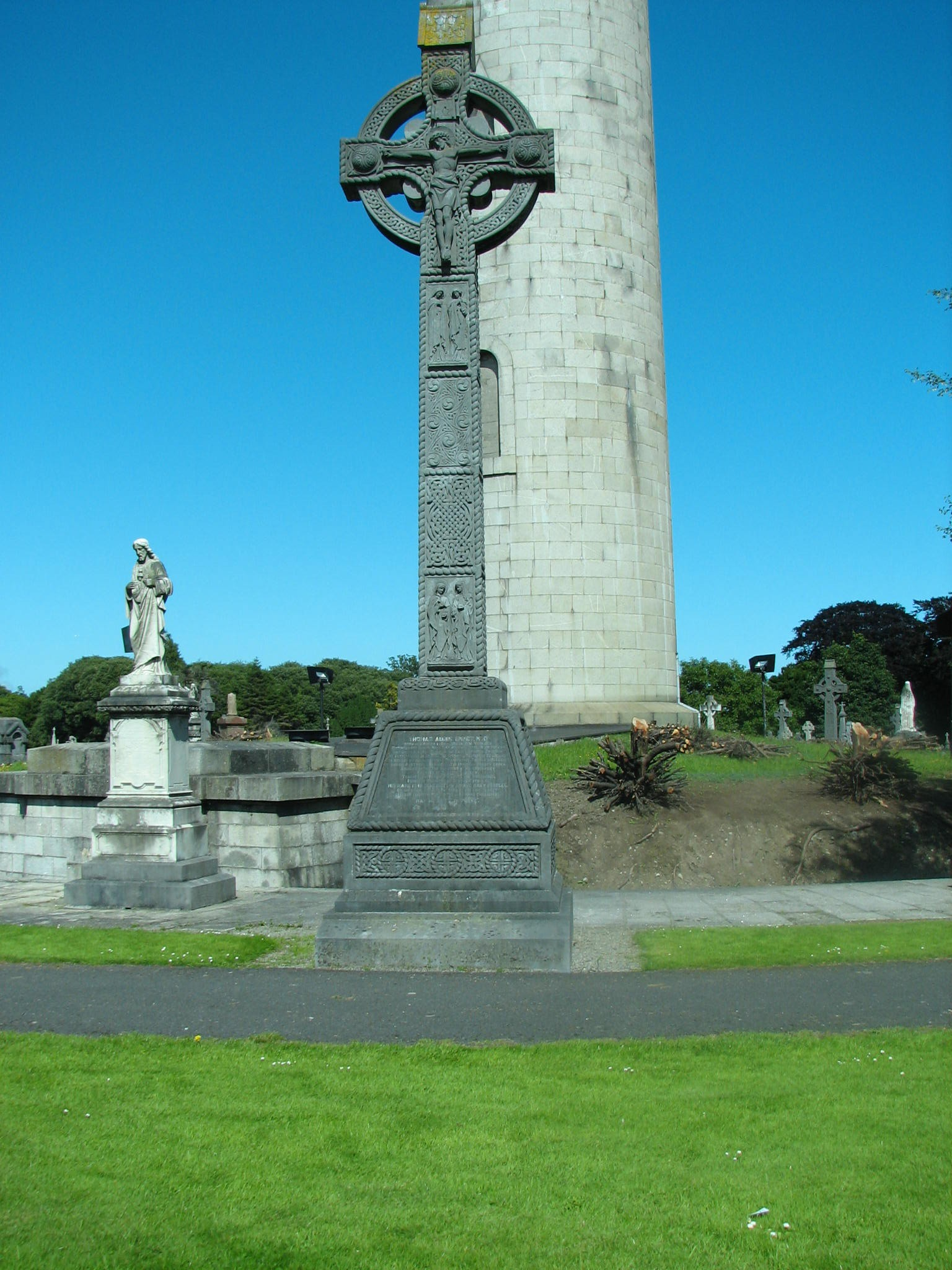
Grave of Dr. Thomas Addis Emmet, Glasnevin Cemetery, Dublin. The cross was sculpted by James and Willie Pearse, father and brother of Patrick Pearse

Emmet died on 14 November 1827 while conducting a case in court regarding the estate of Robert Richard Randall, the founder of Sailors' Snug Harbor, a home for needy seamen in Staten Island, New York. He was initially buried in St Mark's-in-the-Bowery Churchyard in the East Village, New York City.

An obelisk to honour the memory of Emmet, raised through the efforts of his fellow United Irish veterans and abolitionists, William Sampson and William James MacNeven, stands in St. Paul's Chapel's graveyard at 209 Broadway, Lower Manhattan. The inscription acknowledges a "transatlantic life in service of liberty and charity," and Emmet's role in "vindicating the rights of man in the person of the African". MacNeven was later commemorated by a matching obelisk on the far side of the church building.

A bust of Thomas Addis Emmet is stationed in the rotunda of the New York State Supreme Court. He is also commemorated in the Thomas Addis Emmet Collection in the New York Public Library. It consists of "approximately 10,800 historical manuscripts relating chiefly to the period prior to, during, and following the American Revolution".

His grandson, Dr. Thomas Addis Emmet, a prominent doctor and Irish American activist, requested that his grandfather's remains be re-buried in Ireland so he could "rest in the land from which my family came." In the first year of the Irish Free State, in 1922, his remains were interred in Glasnevin Cemetery in Dublin, the final resting place of many of Ireland's patriots. His grave marker was designed by the father and brother of the revolutionary Patrick Pearse.

Legal offices
Preceded by Matthias B. Hildreth	New York State Attorney General; 1812–1813	Succeeded by Abraham Van Vechten
