= Michael Dwyer =

Irish Nationalist

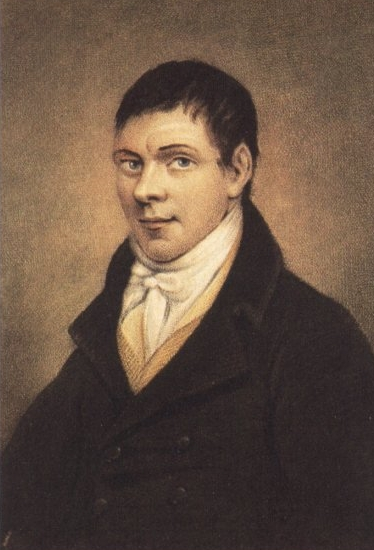
- Nickname: "The Wicklow Chief"
- Born: 1 January 1772; County Wicklow, Ireland
- Died: 23 August 1825 (aged 53) Liverpool, New South Wales, Australia
- Allegiance: Society of the United Irishmen
- Conflicts: 1798 rebellion Guerrilla Campaign 1799–1803

Michael Dwyer (1 January 1772– 23 August 1825) was an insurgent captain in the Irish Rebellion of 1798, leading the United Irish forces in battles in Wexford and Wicklow. Following the defeat and dispersal of the rebel hosts, in July 1798 Dwyer withdrew into the Wicklow Mountains, and to his native Glen of Imaal, where he sustained a guerrilla campaign against British Crown forces.

The failure in July 1803 of the rising in Dublin planned by Anne Devlin, his cousin, and by Robert Emmet, with which he had hoped to coordinate, and the internment of virtually all his extended family, disposed "the Wicklow chief" to accept terms. With his closest lieutenants he was transported to New South Wales, Australia as an un-sentenced exile and free man in 1806. In Sydney in 1807, he was twice imprisoned and twice tried, but ultimately acquitted, of plotting an Irish insurrection against the British rule in New South Wales. As a result of the Rum Rebellion in 1808, he was reinstated as a free man in New South Wales. He was appointed Chief of Police in Liverpool, Sydney in 1813. In May 1825 due to the alleged non-payment of a £100 debt, he was committed to a debtors' prison where he contracted dysentery. He was released on 24 May 1825. Just three months later he died on 23 August 1825 at the age of 53, never having seen his four youngest children since leaving them in Ireland.

In 1898 his remains were re-interred in Waverley Cemetery, Sydney. A crowd of over 200,000 attended the re-interment of Michael Dwyer. On the monument erected to Michael Dwyer at Waverley Cemetery, Sydney, are inscribed the names of Irish patriots, including Wolfe Tone, (Protestant), Lord Edward Fitzgerald, (Protestant), The Rev William Jackson (journalist) (Anglican), William Orr (United Irishman) (Protestant), Michael Dwyer (Catholic) and dedicated to those of all religions sharing in the love of Ireland. Michael Dwyer's large monument at Waverley Cemetery, Sydney, is of white Carrara marble, intricately decorated with sculptures, plaques, inscriptions, medallions and mosaic and topped with a 30-foot carved cross, the monument was built to be a testament to Ireland's struggle for self-government and its patriots who fought in the rebellion. The memorial is the largest monument to the 1798 Irish rebellion in the world.

== Family ==
Michael Dwyer was the eldest of four brothers and three sisters in the Catholic family of John Dwyer of Camara in Imaal and Mary Byrne, daughter of Charles Byrne of Cullentragh. At Ballyhubbock school in Imaal, Dwyer received his education from its master, a man whom Dwyer greatly admired for his patriotism. In 1784, John Dwyer moved his family to Eadestown in Imaal where they reared sheep, on land procured for them with the help of Robert Emmet's family.

In October 1798 he married Mary Doyle of Knockandarragh. They had four children, all of whom were to be left in Ireland with his sister when later they faced a perilous journey into exile in Australia.

== 1798 rebellion ==
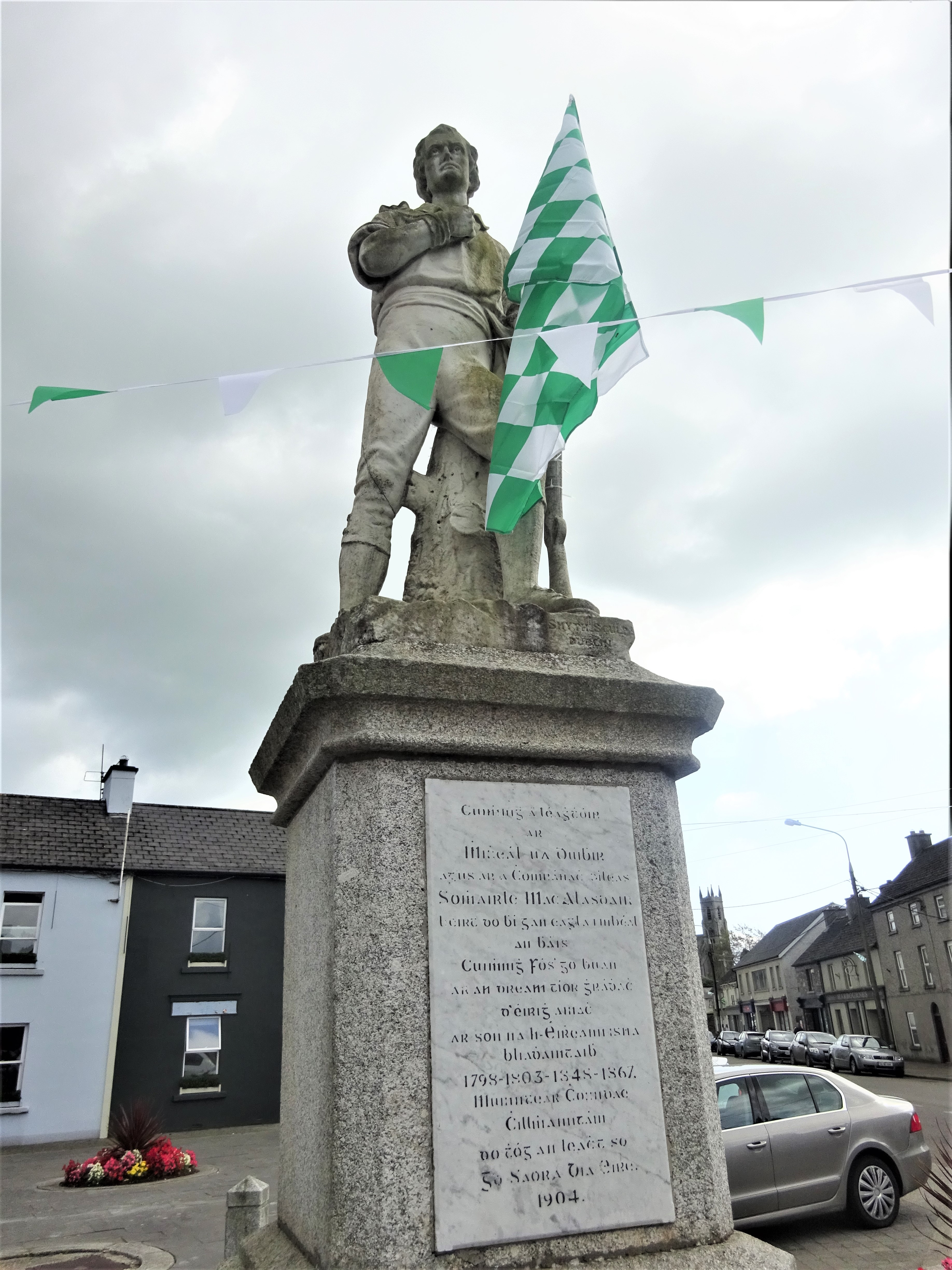
Statue of Sam McAllister, an Ulster Presbyterian and comrade of Dwyer, Baltinglass

Dwyer joined the Society of United Irishmen in the spring of 1797. When the rebellion broke on 23 May 1798, the loyalist yeomanry sought to terrorise the population into submission, executing Dwyer's republican uncle John Dwyer of Seskin along with thirty-five others on Dunlavin Green.

Dwyer made his way to Mount Pleasant near Tinahely where the United Irishmen of Wicklow were gathering under Billy Byrne. As captain under General Joseph Holt (a United Irishman from a Protestant, loyalist family) in battles at Arklow, Vinegar Hill, Ballyellis and Hacketstown. Under Holt's leadership, he withdrew to the safety of the Wicklow Mountains in mid-July, when rebels could no longer operate openly following their defeat in the disastrous midlands campaign. Dwyer and Holt tied down thousands of troops.

Command fell to Dwyer when, following news of the defeat of the French landing force at the Ballinamuck in September 1798, Holt sought terms and surrendered in November.

== Guerrilla campaign ==
Dwyer and his men began a campaign targeting local loyalists and yeomen, attacking small parties of the military and eluding any major sweeps against them. His force was strengthened by many deserters from the government's conscript militia, who headed to Wicklow as the last rebel stronghold and who became the dedicated backbone of his force, as they could not be expected to be included in any future offer of amnesty.

Due to the constant hunt for him, Dwyer was forced to split and reassemble his forces and hide amongst civilian sympathisers to elude his pursuers. He relied on a large and extended kin network that included the families of Anne Devlin and Hugh Vesty Byrne of Kirikee, allowing him to develop a series of dugouts, caves and safe houses. In a massive military campaign to catch him, the government constructed a "Military Road" from Glencree to Imaal, along with five Military barracks to protect it.

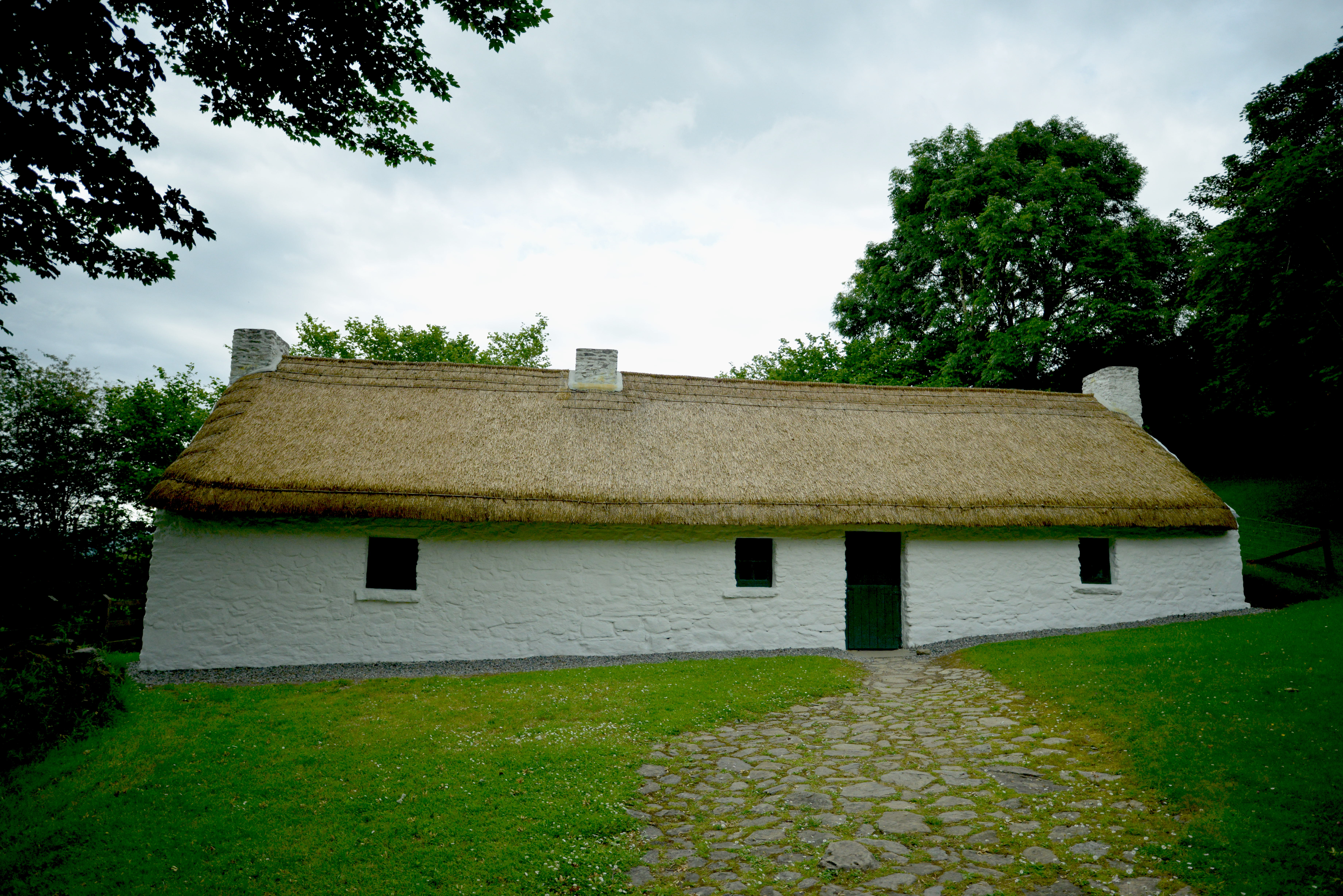
The Dwyer–McAllister Cottage

On 15 February 1799 at Dernamuck, he and about a dozen comrades were sheltering in three cottages when an informer led a large force of British soldiers to the area. The cottages were quickly surrounded, the first two surrendering, but, following consultation, Dwyer and his men decided to fight on in the third one, Miley Connell's cottage, after negotiating the safe passage of women and children. In the hopeless gunfight which followed, the cottage caught fire and only Dwyer remained unwounded. At this stage, Dwyer's comrade, Antrim man Sam McAllister, stood in the doorway to draw the soldiers' fire on him, which allowed Dwyer to slip out and make an incredible escape. The Dwyer–McAllister Cottage was restored in the 20th century and is now a national monument.

== Dwyer and Robert Emmet ==
Dwyer later made contact with Robert Emmet and was apprised of plans for his revolt but was reluctant to commit his followers to march to Dublin unless the rebellion showed some initial success. The subsequent failure of Emmet's rising led to a period of repression and renewed attempts by the Government to wipe out Dwyer's forces. Methods adopted included attempts to deny him shelter among the civilian population by severely punishing those suspected of harbouring his men, the offer of huge rewards for information, the assigning of thousands of troops to Wicklow, and the building of a series of barracks at Glencree, Laragh, Glenmalure and Aghavannagh and a military road through county Wicklow.

In December 1803, Dwyer finally capitulated on terms that would allow him safe passage to America but the government reneged on the agreement, holding him in Kilmainham Jail until August 1805, when they transported him to New South Wales (Australia) as an un-sentenced exile.

== Australia ==
Dwyer arrived in Sydney on 14 February 1806 on the Tellicherry and was given free settler status. He was accompanied by his wife Mary and their eldest children and also by his companions, Hugh 'Vesty' Byrne and Martin Burke, along with Arthur Devlin and John Mernagh. He was given a grant of 40.5 ha (100 acres) of land on Cabramatta Creek in Sydney. Although he had originally hoped to be sent to the United States of America, Michael Dwyer was later quoted as saying that "all Irish will be free in this new country" (Australia). This statement had been used against him and he was arrested in February 1807 and imprisoned. On 11 May 1807, Dwyer was charged with conspiring to mount an Irish insurrection against British rule. An Irish convict stated in court that Michael Dwyer had plans to march on the seat of Government in Australia, at Parramatta. Dwyer did not deny that he had said that all Irish will be free but he did deny the charges of organising an Irish insurrection in Sydney. Dwyer had the powerful support of Australia's first Jewish policeman, John Harris, who expressed the opinion in court that he did not believe that Dwyer was organising a rebellion against the Government in Sydney. On 18 May 1807, Dwyer was found not guilty of the charges of organising an Irish insurrection in Sydney.

Governor William Bligh disregarded the first trial acquittal of Michael Dwyer. Bligh who regarded the Irish and many other nationalities with contempt, organised another trial for Michael Dwyer in which he was stripped of his free settler status and transported to Van Diemens Land (Tasmania) and Norfolk Island. After Governor Bligh was overthrown in the Rum Rebellion in 1808, the new Governor of New South Wales, George Johnston, who was present at Dwyer's acquittal in the first trial, ordered that Michael Dwyer's freedom be reinstated. Michael Dwyer was later to become Chief of Police (1813–1820) at Liverpool, New South Wales but was dismissed in October for drunken conduct and mislaying important documents. The historian James Sheedy, considers that Dwyer was actually dismissed for supporting his friend Arthur Devlin against the Authorities, and another United Irishman, Denis Molloy, about the same time was hanged for cattle duffing, leaving one of his orphan daughters to be reared by Dwyer and his wife Mary. The man Molloy is mentioned as Dwyer's friend, in the court proceedings of Dwyer's dismissal. In December 1822 he was sued for aggrandising his by-now 620-acre farm. Bankrupted, he was forced to sell off most of his assets, which included a tavern called "The Harrow Inn", although this did not save him from several weeks of incarceration in the Sydney debtors' prison in May 1825. He was released from incarceration on 24 May 1825, however, he had evidently contracted dysentery during that incarceration, to which he succumbed on 23 August 1825.

Originally interred at Liverpool, his remains were reburied in the Devonshire Street Cemetery, Sydney, in 1878, by his grandson John Dwyer, Dean of St Mary's Cathedral. In May 1898 the coincidence of the planned closure of the cemetery and centenary celebrations for the 1798 rebellion suggested the second re-interment of Dwyer and his wife in Waverley Cemetery, where a substantial memorial was erected in 1900. The massive crowds attending Dwyer's burial and the subsequent unveiling of the monument testified to the unique esteem in which Irish-Australians held the former Wicklow hero.

Dwyer had seven children and has numerous descendants throughout Australia. In 2002, in Bungendore near Canberra, a family reunion took place, with Michael Dwyer's descendants joining descendants of related Australian Irish families, the Donoghoes and the Doyles. In 2006, a reunion also took place to mark the 200th anniversary of the arrival of the Tellicherry in Botany Bay. One of Michael Dwyer's sons was the owner of The Harp Hotel in Bungendore, New South Wales in c. 1838. Dwyer's nephew, John Donoghoe (1822–1892), built The Old Stone House, Molongolo Rd, Bungendore, in c. 1865. This dwelling is a strongly constructed Bungendore landmark and a monument to pioneering and hard-working Irish Australian settlers.

== Commemoration ==
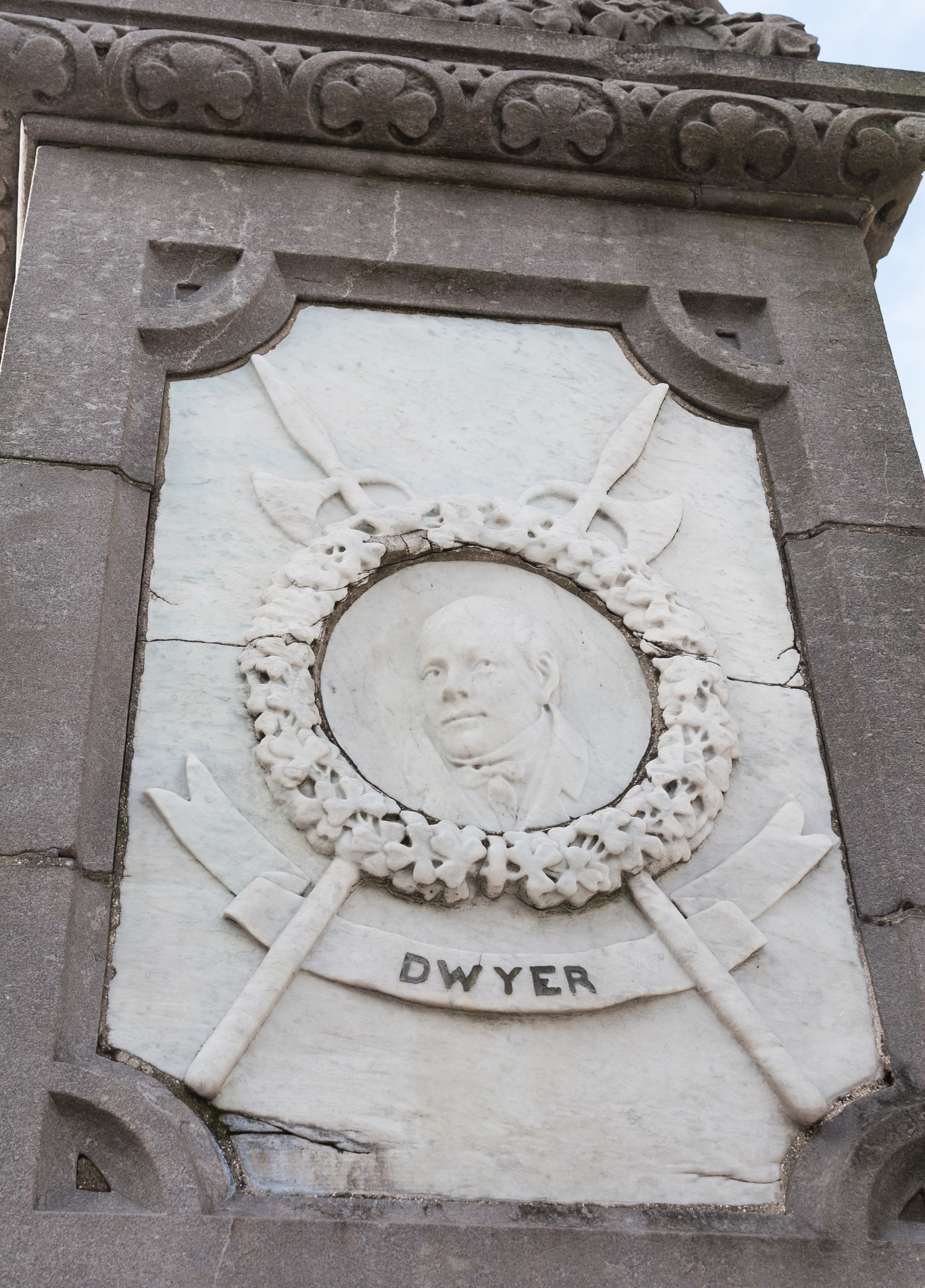
Marble relief of Michael Dwyer on the east face of the Billy Byrne monument in Wicklow

On 9 December 1900, a monument was erected in memory of Billy Byrne, Michael Dwyer, General William J. Holt, and William Michael Byrne, at the Market Square in Wicklow, facing the courthouse. The monument was designed by the Dublin architect Thomas Coleman and executed by the Dublin sculptor George Smyth.

'Dwyer's Cottage', or the 'Dwyer–McAllister Cottage', as it is more formally known, was acquired by the Irish State from the Hoxey family on 22 August 1948. President Seán T. O'Kelly was present at a ceremony to mark the occasion.

At least two Gaelic Athletic Association clubs bear Dwyer's name: Keady Michael Dwyer's GFC is a club in County Armagh, and Michael Dwyers is a juvenile club in County Wicklow.

== Cultural depictions ==
Dwyer is depicted as one of the few survivors of Vinegar Hill in the 2015 American musical "Guns of Ireland".

== See also ==
Michael Dwyer was brought to Australia as a politically arranged un-sentenced rebel exile in 1806. Therefore, he was not transported to Australia as a convict. For more information on other Irish rebel political exiles in Australia see the following:

- Irish-born rebels were strongly represented at the Castle Hill convict rebellion in 1804 in Sydney and the Eureka Rebellion in 1854 in Ballarat.
- Irish rebels were rescued from Western Australia and brought (contrary to British colonial rule) to the US in the Catalpa rescue in 1876
