= Dwyer–McAllister Cottage =

National Monument in Wicklow, Ireland

- Teach Uí Dhuibhir Mhic Alastair
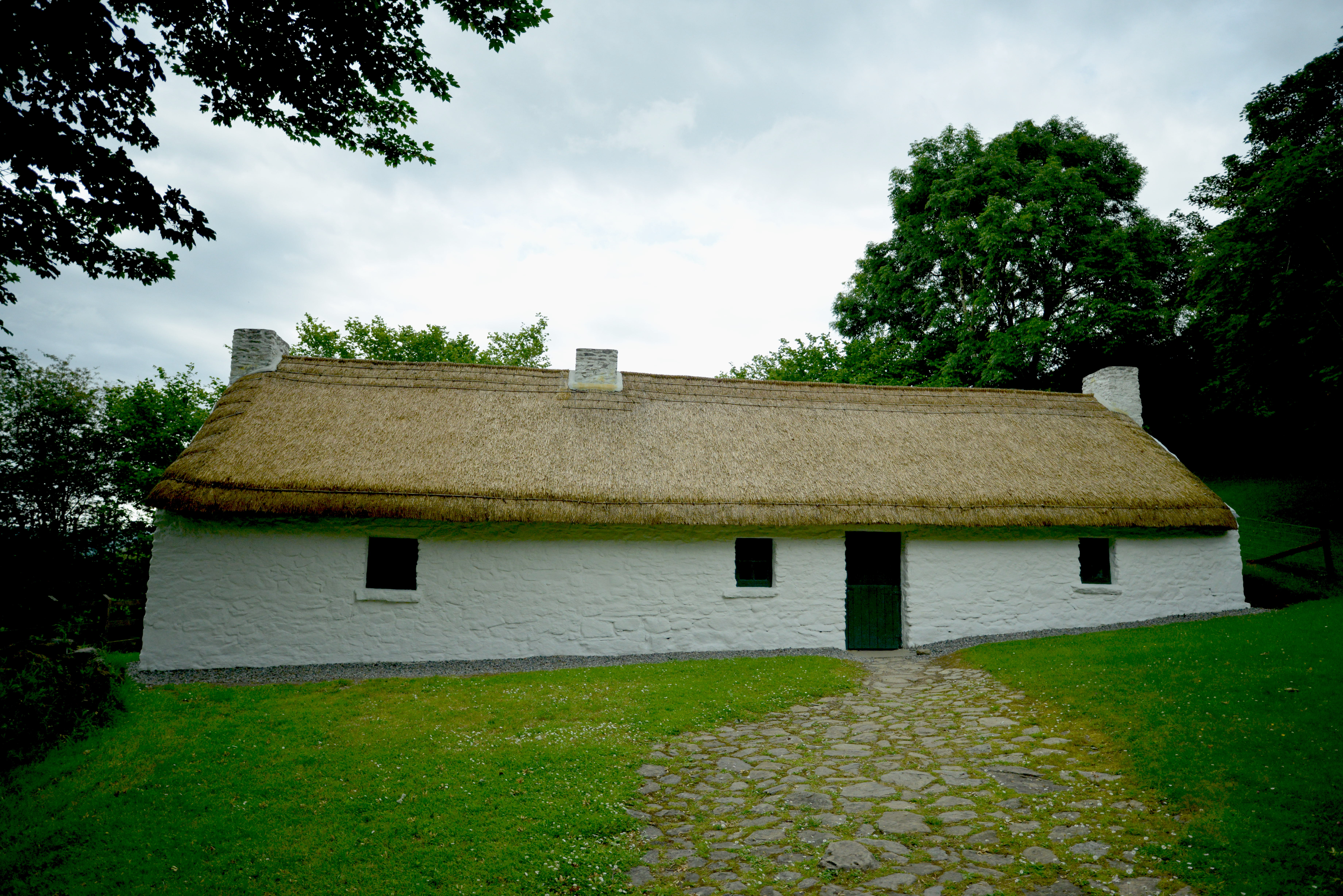

- Location within Ireland

General information
- Status: Museum
- Type: Thatched cottage
- Architectural style: Vernacular
- Location: Derrynamuck, Donard, Ireland
- Coordinates: 52.962126°N 6.564607°W
- Elevation: 244 m (801 ft)
- Completed: c. 1780
- Renovated: 1992

Technical details
- Material: Stone, timber, pitch, thatch
- Floor count: 1

Design and construction
- Known for: Scene of a shootout

Other information
- Number of rooms: 3

National monument of Ireland
- Official name: Dwyer-McAllister Cottage
- Reference no.: 449

The Dwyer–McAllister Cottage is a thatched cottage and National Monument located in the Glen of Imaal, County Wicklow, Ireland.

== Location ==
The Dwyer–McAllister Cottage is located on the northeast face of Keadeen Mountain. A stream located to the west of the house flows north for 1.1 km (2/3 mile) and enters the Little Slaney River.

== History ==
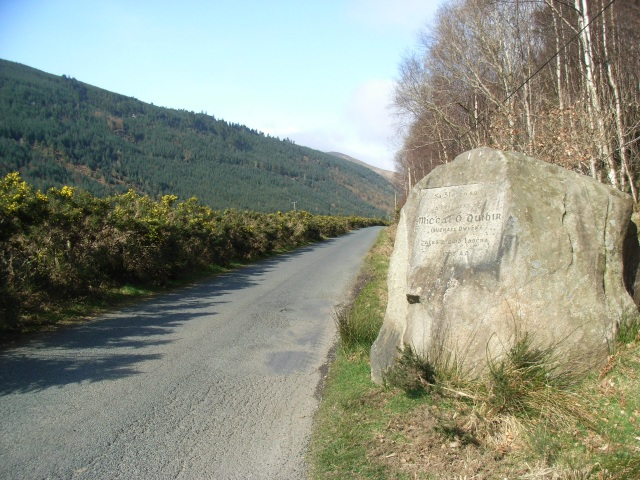
Dwyer memorial, Glenmalure

In the aftermath of the 1798 Rebellion, United Irishmen leader Michael Dwyer continued to fight a guerrilla war against government loyalists and yeomen. On 15 February 1799, he and about a dozen comrades were sheltering in three cottages when an informer led a large force of government soldiers to the area. The cottages were quickly surrounded, the first two surrendering, but, following consultation, Dwyer and his men decided to fight on in the third one (Miley Connell's cottage) — after negotiating the safe passage of women and children. In the gunfight which followed, the cottage caught fire and only Dwyer remained unwounded. At this stage, Dwyer's comrade, Antrim man Sam McAllister, stood in the doorway to draw the soldiers' fire on him, which allowed Dwyer to slip out and make his escape. Dwyer remained on the run until 1803.

The Dwyer–McAllister Cottage, or 'Dwyer's Cottage', as it is more informally known, was acquired by the Irish State from the Hoxey family on 22 August 1948. President Seán T. O'Kelly, Éamon de Valera and other dignitaries were present at a ceremony to mark the occasion. The house was extended as a museum in 1992 and is open to the public on summer afternoons from mid-June to mid-September.

== Description ==
The cottage is a detached three-bay single-storey vernacular house, originally built c. 1780, with single-bay portion to the north end, reconstructed in 1992. The walls are constructed in coursed rubble; the pitched roof is thatched and has whitewashed rubble chimneystacks. The entrance is a timber tongue and groove half door whilst the window openings are flat-headed and have replacement 'pivot' timber windows. Internally there are three rooms opening off each other, with whitewashed walls, earthen floors and exposed roof timbers.
