= 81st United States Congress =

1949–1951 U.S. Congress

←	80th	82nd	→
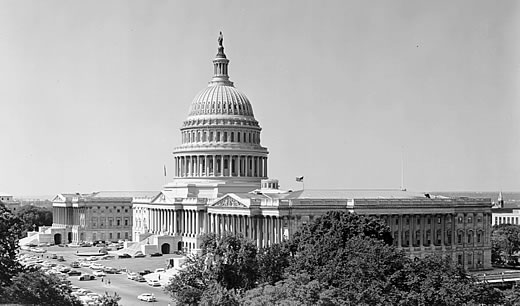
- United States Capitol (1956)

Overview
- Legislative body: United States Congress
- Jurisdiction: United States
- Term: January 3, 1949 – January 3, 1951

Senate
- Members: 96
- President: Vacant (until January 20, 1949); Alben W. Barkley (D) (from January 20, 1949)
- President pro tempore: Kenneth McKellar (D)
- Party control: Democratic

House of Representatives
- Members: 435 representatives 3 non-voting delegates
- Speaker: Sam Rayburn (D)
- Party control: Democratic

Sessions
- 1st: January 3, 1949 – October 19, 1949
- 2nd: January 3, 1950 – January 2, 1951

The 81st United States Congress was a meeting of the legislative branch of the United States federal government, composed of the United States Senate and the United States House of Representatives. It met in Washington, D.C. from January 3, 1949, to January 3, 1951, during the fifth and sixth years of Harry S. Truman's presidency.

The apportionment of seats in this House of Representatives was based on the 1940 United States census.

The Democrats won back the majority in both chambers, and with the election of President Harry S. Truman to his own full term in office, this gave the Democrats an overall federal government trifecta.

== Major events ==
- January 20, 1949: President Harry S. Truman began his second (only full) term. Alben W. Barkley began his term as Vice President, which had been vacant since 1945.
- August 16, 1949: Office of Chairman of the Joint Chiefs of Staff created
- January 21, 1950: Accused communist spy Alger Hiss was convicted of perjury
- January 31, 1950: President Truman ordered the development of the hydrogen bomb, in response to the detonation of the Soviet Union's first atomic bomb in 1949
- June 1st, 1950: Senator Margaret Smith made the Declaration of Conscience speech as the first refutation of McCarthyism in the Senate.
- June 27, 1950: Korean War: President Truman ordered American military forces to aid in the defense of South Korea

== Major legislation ==
Civil libertarians and radical political activists considered the McCarran Act to be a dangerous and unconstitutional infringement of political liberty, as exemplified in this 1961 poster.

- June 20, 1949: Central Intelligence Agency Act, ch. 227, 63 Stat. 208, 50 U.S.C. § 403a
- October 25, 1949: Hospital Survey and Construction Amendments of 1949, ch. 722, Pub. L. 81–380, 63 Stat. 898
- October 26, 1949: Fair Labor Standards Amendment, ch. 736, Pub. L. 81–393, 63 Stat. 910, 29 U.S.C. ch. 8
- October 31, 1949: Agricultural Act of 1949, ch. 792, 63 Stat. 1051
- May 5, 1950: Uniform Code of Military Justice, ch. 169, 64 Stat. 109
- May 10, 1950: National Science Foundation Act, ch. 171, Pub. L. 81–507, 64 Stat. 149, 42 U.S.C. ch. 16
- August 15, 1950: Omnibus Medical Research Act, Pub. L. 81–692, 64 Stat. 443 (including Public Health Services Act Amendments, which established the National Institute of Neurological Diseases and Blindness)
- September 8, 1950: Defense Production Act of 1950, Pub. L. 81–774, 64 Stat. 798
- September 12, 1950: Budget and Accounting Procedures Act of 1950, ch. 946, 64 Stat. 832
- September 23, 1950: McCarran Internal Security Act (including Subversive Activities Control Act of 1950), ch. 1024, 64 Stat. 987, 50 U.S.C. § 781
- September 30, 1950: Performance Rating Act, ch. 1123, 64 Stat. 1098
- December 29, 1950: Celler–Kefauver Act (Anti-Merger Act), ch. 1184, 64 Stat. 1125
- January 12, 1951: Federal Civil Defense Act of 1950, ch. 1228, 64 Stat. 1245 (codified in 50 U.S.C. App., here )

== Treaties ==
- July 21, 1949: North Atlantic Treaty ratified, establishing the North Atlantic Treaty Organization (NATO)

== Hearings ==
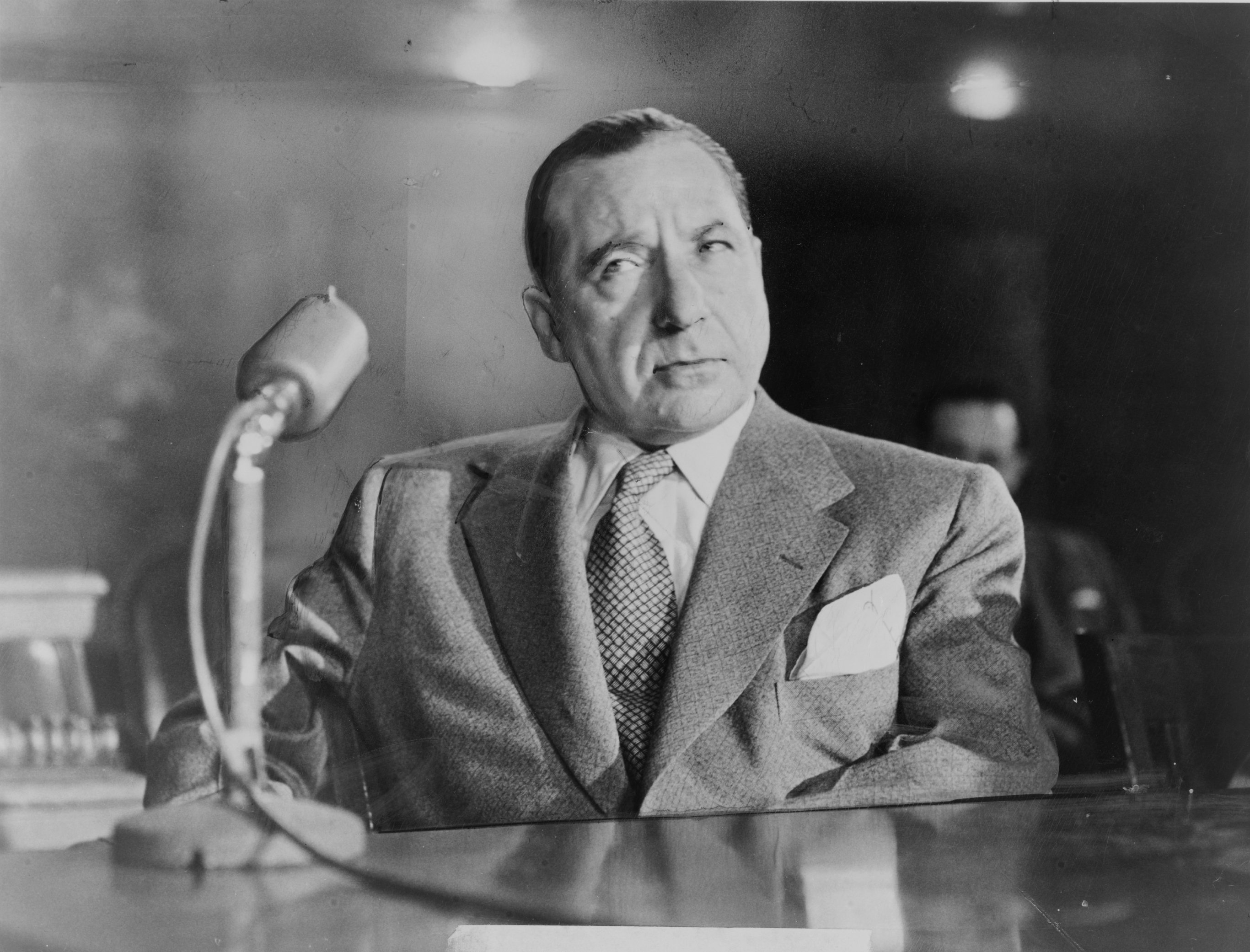
Mobster Frank Costello testifying before the Kefauver Committee.

- May 11, 1950: Kefauver Committee hearings into U.S. organized crime began

== Party summary ==
=== Senate ===
	Party (shading shows control)		Total	Vacant
	Democratic (D)	Republican (R)	Total	Vacant
End of previous congress	45	51	96	0
Begin	54	42	96	0
End	53	43	96	0
Final voting share	55.2%	44.8%		
Beginning of next congress	49	47	96	0

=== House of Representatives ===
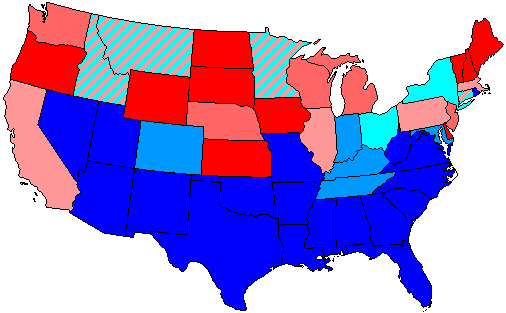
House seats by party holding plurality in state: 80+ to 100% Democratic / 80+ to 100% Republican; 60+ to 80% Democratic / 60+ to 80% Republican; Up to 60% Democratic / Up to 60% Republican

	Party (shading shows control)					Total	Vacant
	American Labor (AL)	Democratic (D)	Liberal (Lib)	Republican (R)	Independent (I)	Total	Vacant
End of previous congress	2	186	0	242	0	430	5
Begin	1	262	0	171	0	434	1
End	1	259	1	168	0	429	6
Final voting share	0.2%	60.4%	0.2%	39.2%	0.0%		
Beginning of next congress	0	235	0	199	1	435	0

== Leadership ==
Senate President

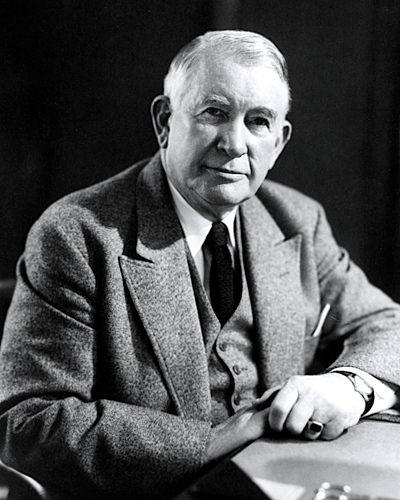
Alben W. Barkley

Senate President pro tempore

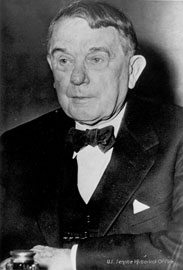
Kenneth McKellar

House Speaker

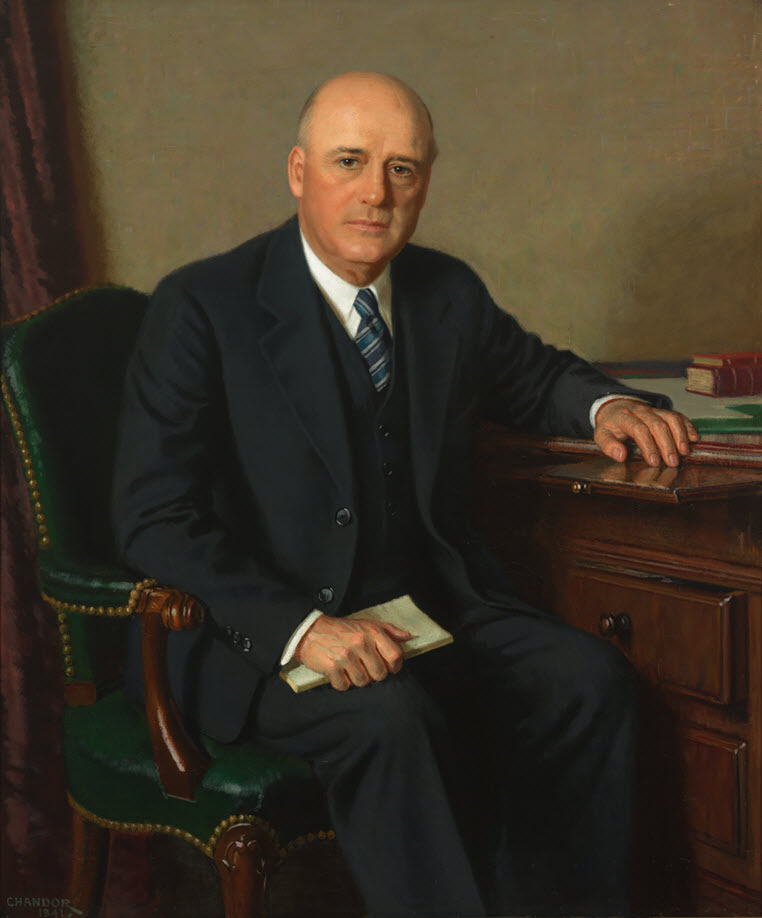
House Speaker
Sam Rayburn

=== Senate ===
- President: Vacant until January 20, 1949
  - Alben W. Barkley (D), from January 20, 1949
- President pro tempore: Kenneth McKellar (D)

==== Majority (Democratic) leadership ====
- Majority Leader: Scott W. Lucas
- Majority Whip: Francis J. Myers
- Democratic Caucus Secretary: Brien McMahon
- Policy Committee Chairman: Scott W. Lucas

==== Minority (Republican) leadership ====
- Minority Leader: Kenneth S. Wherry
- Minority Whip: Leverett Saltonstall
- Republican Conference Chairman: Eugene Millikin
- Republican Conference Secretary: Milton Young
- National Senatorial Committee Chair: Styles Bridges
- Policy Committee Chairman: Robert A. Taft

=== House of Representatives ===
- Speaker: Sam Rayburn (D)

==== Majority (Democratic) leadership ====
- Majority Leader: John W. McCormack
- Majority Whip: Percy Priest
- Democratic Caucus Chairman: Francis E. Walter
- Democratic Caucus Secretary: Chase G. Woodhouse
- Democratic Campaign Committee Chairman: Michael J. Kirwan

==== Minority (Republican) leadership ====
- Minority Leader: Joseph W. Martin Jr.
- Minority Whip: Leslie C. Arends
- Republican Conference Chairman: Roy O. Woodruff
- Policy Committee Chairman: Joseph W. Martin Jr.
- Republican Campaign Committee Chairman: Leonard W. Hall

== Caucuses ==
- House Democratic Caucus
- Senate Democratic Caucus

== Members ==
=== Senate ===
Senators are popularly elected statewide every two years, with one-third beginning new six-year terms with each Congress. Senators are ordered first by state, and then by seniority. Preceding the names in the list below are Senate class numbers, which indicate the cycle of their election, In this Congress, Class 3 meant their term ended with this Congress, requiring reelection in 1950; Class 1 meant their term began in the last Congress, requiring reelection in 1952; and Class 2 meant their term began in this Congress, requiring reelection in 1954.

==== Alabama ====
▌2. John Sparkman (D)
▌3. J. Lister Hill (D)

==== Arizona ====
▌1. Ernest McFarland (D)
▌3. Carl Hayden (D)

==== Arkansas ====
▌2. John L. McClellan (D)
▌3. J. William Fulbright (D)

==== California ====
▌1. William Knowland (R)
▌3. Sheridan Downey (D), until November 30, 1950

▌Richard Nixon (R), from December 1, 1950

==== Colorado ====
▌2. Edwin C. Johnson (D)
▌3. Eugene Millikin (R)

==== Connecticut ====
▌1. Raymond E. Baldwin (R), until December 16, 1949

▌William Benton (D), from December 17, 1949

▌3. Brien McMahon (D)

==== Delaware ====
▌1. John J. Williams (R)
▌2. J. Allen Frear Jr. (D)

==== Florida ====
▌1. Spessard Holland (D)
▌3. Claude Pepper (D)

==== Georgia ====
▌2. Walter F. George (D)
▌3. Richard Russell Jr. (D)

==== Idaho ====
▌2. Bert H. Miller (D), until October 8, 1949

▌Henry Dworshak (R), from October 14, 1949

▌3. Glen H. Taylor (D)

==== Illinois ====
▌2. Paul Douglas (D)
▌3. Scott W. Lucas (D)

==== Indiana ====
▌1. William E. Jenner (R)
▌3. Homer E. Capehart (R)

==== Iowa ====
▌2. Guy Gillette (D)
▌3. Bourke B. Hickenlooper (R)

==== Kansas ====
▌2. Andrew Frank Schoeppel (R)
▌3. Clyde M. Reed (R), until November 8, 1949

▌Harry Darby (R), December 2, 1949 - November 28, 1950
▌Frank Carlson (R), from November 29, 1950

==== Kentucky ====
▌2. Virgil Chapman (D)
▌3. Alben W. Barkley (D), until January 19, 1949

▌Garrett Withers (D), January 20, 1949 - November 26, 1950
▌Earle Clements (D), from November 27, 1950

==== Louisiana ====
▌2. Allen J. Ellender (D)
▌3. Russell B. Long (D)

==== Maine ====
▌1. Owen Brewster (R)
▌2. Margaret Chase Smith (R)

==== Maryland ====
▌1. Herbert O'Conor (D)
▌3. Millard Tydings (D)

==== Massachusetts ====
▌1. Henry Cabot Lodge Jr. (R)
▌2. Leverett Saltonstall (R)

==== Michigan ====
▌1. Arthur Vandenberg (R)
▌2. Homer S. Ferguson (R)

==== Minnesota ====
▌1. Edward J. Thye (R)
▌2. Hubert Humphrey (DFL) (Note: The Minnesota Democratic–Farmer–Labor Party (DFL) is the Minnesota affiliate of the U.S. Democratic Party and are counted as Democrats.)

==== Mississippi ====
▌1. John C. Stennis (D)
▌2. James Eastland (D)

==== Missouri ====
▌1. James P. Kem (R)
▌3. Forrest C. Donnell (R)

==== Montana ====
▌1. Zales Ecton (R)
▌2. James E. Murray (D)

==== Nebraska ====
▌1. Hugh A. Butler (R)
▌2. Kenneth S. Wherry (R)

==== Nevada ====
▌1. George W. Malone (R)
▌3. Pat McCarran (D)

==== New Hampshire ====
▌2. Styles Bridges (R)
▌3. Charles W. Tobey (R)

==== New Jersey ====
▌1. H. Alexander Smith (R)
▌2. Robert C. Hendrickson (R)

==== New Mexico ====
▌1. Dennis Chávez (D)
▌2. Clinton Anderson (D)

==== New York ====
▌1. Irving Ives (R)
▌3. Robert F. Wagner (D), until June 28, 1949

▌John Foster Dulles (R), July 7, 1949 - November 8, 1949
▌Herbert H. Lehman (D), from November 9, 1949

==== North Carolina ====
▌2. J. Melville Broughton (D), until March 6, 1949

▌Frank Porter Graham (D), March 29, 1949 - November 26, 1950
▌Willis Smith (D), from November 27, 1950

▌3. Clyde R. Hoey (D)

==== North Dakota ====
▌1. William Langer (R-NPL)
▌3. Milton Young (R)

==== Ohio ====
▌1. John W. Bricker (R)
▌3. Robert A. Taft (R)

==== Oklahoma ====
▌2. Robert S. Kerr (D)
▌3. Elmer Thomas (D)

==== Oregon ====
▌2. Guy Cordon (R)
▌3. Wayne Morse (R)

==== Pennsylvania ====
▌1. Edward Martin (R)
▌3. Francis J. Myers (D)

==== Rhode Island ====
▌1. J. Howard McGrath (D), until August 23, 1949

▌Edward L. Leahy (D), August 24, 1949 - December 18, 1950
▌John Pastore (D), from December 19, 1950

▌2. Theodore F. Green (D)

==== South Carolina ====
▌2. Burnet R. Maybank (D)
▌3. Olin D. Johnston (D)

==== South Dakota ====
▌2. Karl Mundt (R)
▌3. Chan Gurney (R)

==== Tennessee ====
▌1. Kenneth McKellar (D)
▌2. Estes Kefauver (D)

==== Texas ====
▌1. Tom Connally (D)
▌2. Lyndon B. Johnson (D)

==== Utah ====
▌1. Arthur V. Watkins (R)
▌3. Elbert D. Thomas (D)

==== Vermont ====
▌1. Ralph Flanders (R)
▌3. George Aiken (R)

==== Virginia ====
▌1. Harry F. Byrd (D)
▌2. A. Willis Robertson (D)

==== Washington ====
▌1. Harry P. Cain (R)
▌3. Warren Magnuson (D)

==== West Virginia ====
▌1. Harley M. Kilgore (D)
▌2. Matthew M. Neely (D)

==== Wisconsin ====
▌1. Joseph McCarthy (R)
▌3. Alexander Wiley (R)

==== Wyoming ====
▌1. Joseph C. O'Mahoney (D)
▌2. Lester C. Hunt (D)

Senators' party membership by state at the opening of the 81st Congress in January 1949 2 Democrats 1 Democrat and 1 Republican 2 Republicans

Senate majority leaders

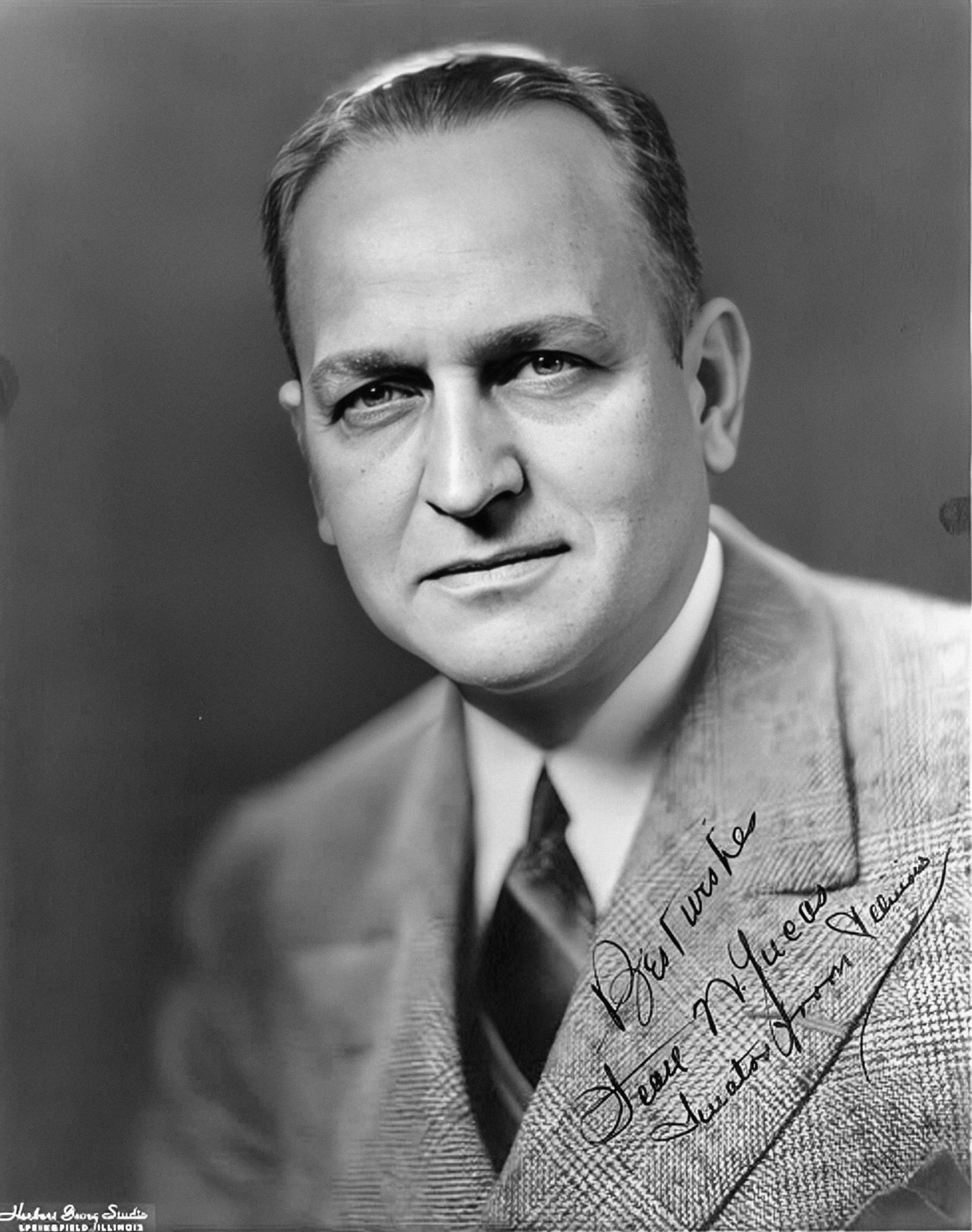
Democratic Leader
Scott W. Lucas

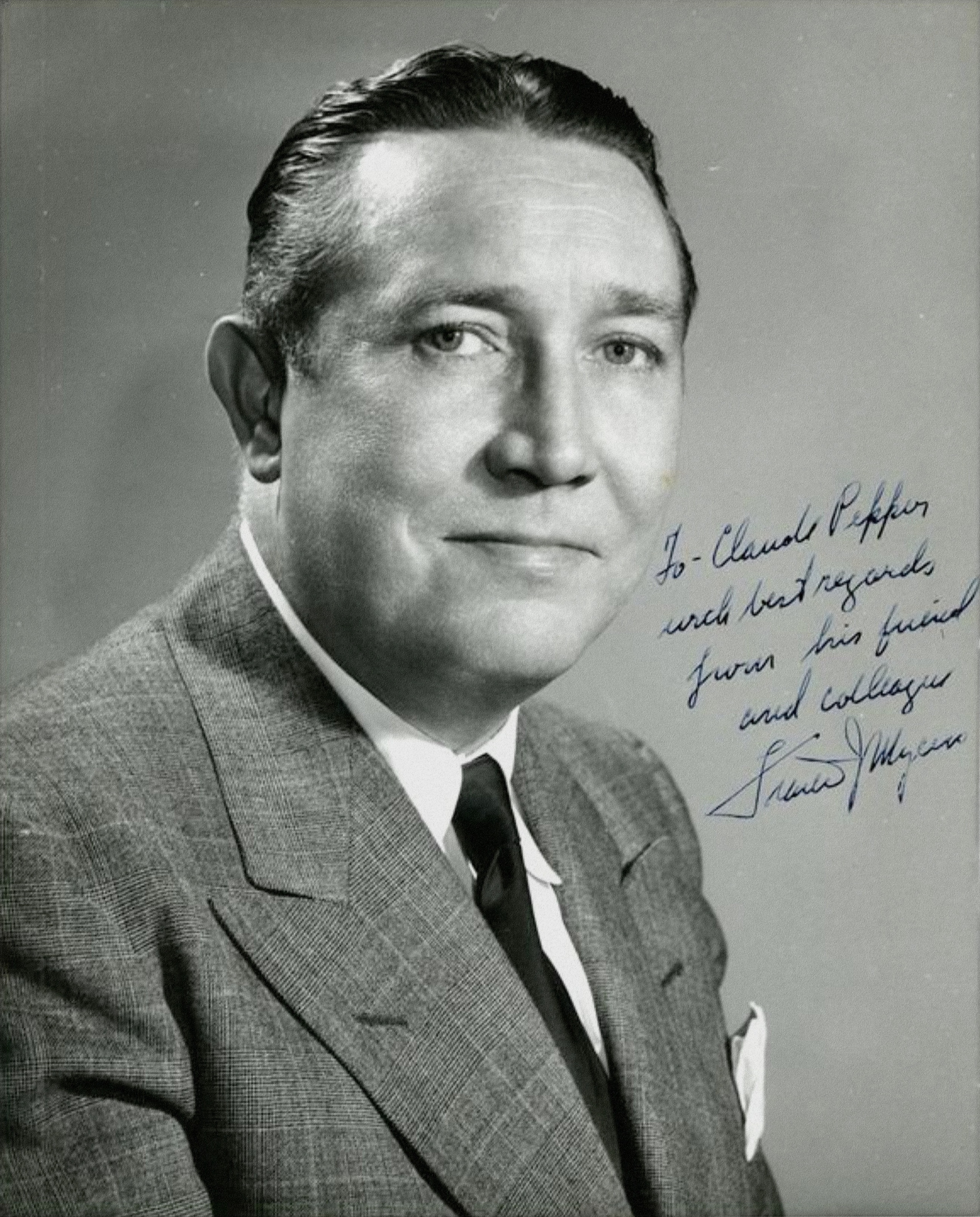
Democratic Whip
Francis J. Myers

Senate minority leaders

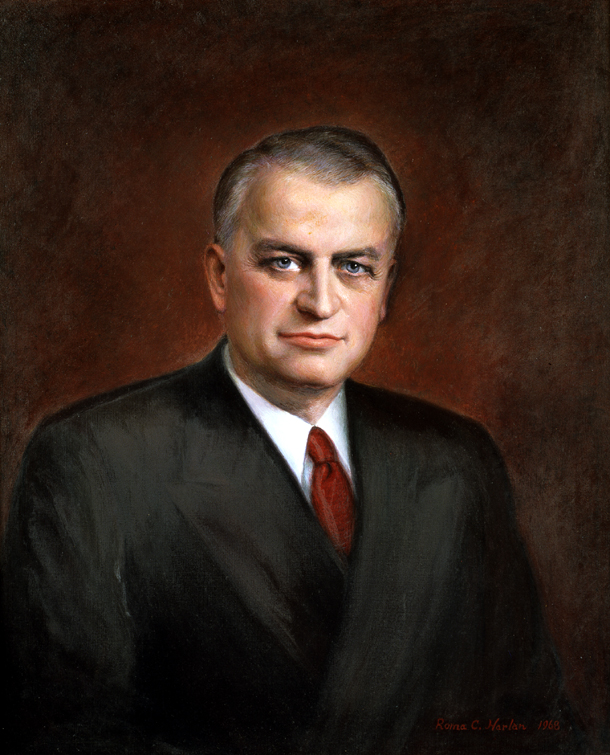
Republican Leader
Kenneth S. Wherry

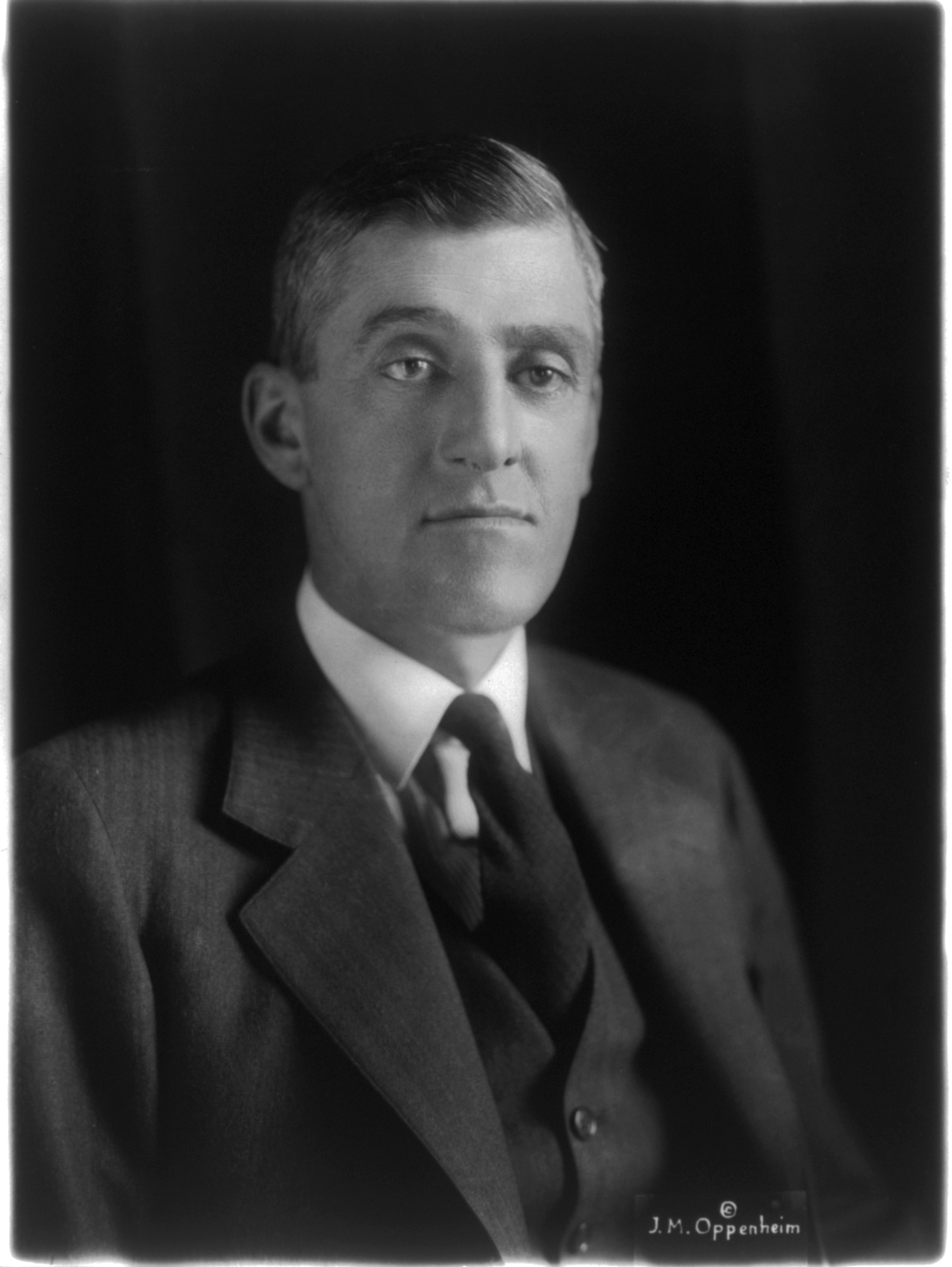
Republican Whip
Leverett Saltonstall

=== House of Representatives ===
==== Alabama ====
▌1. Frank W. Boykin (D)
▌2. George M. Grant (D)
▌3. George W. Andrews (D)
▌4. Sam Hobbs (D)
▌5. Albert Rains (D)
▌6. Edward deGraffenried (D)
▌7. Carl Elliott (D)
▌8. Robert E. Jones Jr. (D)
▌9. Laurie C. Battle (D)

==== Arizona ====
▌1. John R. Murdock (D)
▌2. Harold Patten (D)

==== Arkansas ====
▌1. Ezekiel C. Gathings (D)
▌2. Wilbur Mills (D)
▌3. James William Trimble (D)
▌4. Boyd Anderson Tackett (D)
▌5. Brooks Hays (D)
▌6. William F. Norrell (D)
▌7. Oren Harris (D)

==== California ====
▌1. Hubert B. Scudder (R)
▌2. Clair Engle (D)
▌3. J. Leroy Johnson (R)
▌4. Franck R. Havenner (D)
▌5. Richard J. Welch (R), until September 10, 1949

▌John F. Shelley (D), from November 8, 1949

▌6. George P. Miller (D)
▌7. John J. Allen Jr. (R)
▌8. Jack Z. Anderson (R)
▌9. Cecil F. White (D)
▌10. Thomas H. Werdel (R)
▌11. Ernest K. Bramblett (R)
▌12. Richard Nixon (R), until November 30, 1950
▌13. Norris Poulson (R)
▌14. Helen Gahagan Douglas (D)
▌15. Gordon L. McDonough (R)
▌16. Donald L. Jackson (R)
▌17. Cecil R. King (D)
▌18. Clyde Doyle (D)
▌19. Chester E. Holifield (D)
▌20. John Carl Hinshaw (R)
▌21. Harry R. Sheppard (D)
▌22. John R. Phillips (R)
▌23. Clinton D. McKinnon (D)

==== Colorado ====
▌1. John A. Carroll (D)
▌2. William S. Hill (R)
▌3. John H. Marsalis (D)
▌4. Wayne N. Aspinall (D)

==== Connecticut ====
▌1. Abraham Ribicoff (D)
▌2. Chase G. Woodhouse (D)
▌3. John A. McGuire (D)
▌4. John Davis Lodge (R)
▌5. James T. Patterson (R)
▌At-large. Antoni Sadlak (R)

==== Delaware ====
▌At-large. J. Caleb Boggs (R)

==== Florida ====
▌1. J. Hardin Peterson (D)
▌2. Charles E. Bennett (D)
▌3. Robert L. F. Sikes (D)
▌4. George Smathers (D)
▌5. Syd Herlong (D)
▌6. Dwight L. Rogers (D)

==== Georgia ====
▌1. Prince Preston (D)
▌2. E. Eugene Cox (D)
▌3. Stephen Pace (D)
▌4. Albert Sidney Camp (D)
▌5. James C. Davis (D)
▌6. Carl Vinson (D)
▌7. Henderson Lovelace Lanham (D)
▌8. William McDonald Wheeler (D)
▌9. John S. Wood (D)
▌10. Paul Brown (D)

==== Idaho ====
▌1. Compton I. White (D)
▌2. John C. Sanborn (R)

==== Illinois ====
▌1. William L. Dawson (D)
▌2. Barratt O'Hara (D)
▌3. Neil J. Linehan (D)
▌4. James V. Buckley (D)
▌5. Martin Gorski (D), until December 4, 1949
▌6. Thomas J. O'Brien (D)
▌7. Adolph J. Sabath (D)
▌8. Thomas S. Gordon (D)
▌9. Sidney R. Yates (D)
▌10. Richard W. Hoffman (R)
▌11. Chester A. Chesney (D)
▌12. Edgar A. Jonas (R)
▌13. Ralph E. Church (R), until March 21, 1950
▌14. Chauncey W. Reed (R)
▌15. Noah M. Mason (R)
▌16. Leo E. Allen (R)
▌17. Leslie C. Arends (R)
▌18. Harold H. Velde (R)
▌19. Robert B. Chiperfield (R)
▌20. Sid Simpson (R)
▌21. Peter F. Mack Jr. (D)
▌22. Rolla C. McMillen (R)
▌23. Edward H. Jenison (R)
▌24. Charles W. Vursell (R)
▌25. Melvin Price (D)
▌26. C. W. Bishop (R)

==== Indiana ====
▌1. Ray Madden (D)
▌2. Charles A. Halleck (R)
▌3. Thurman C. Crook (D)
▌4. Edward H. Kruse (D)
▌5. John R. Walsh (D)
▌6. Cecil M. Harden (R)
▌7. James Ellsworth Noland (D)
▌8. Winfield K. Denton (D)
▌9. Earl Wilson (R)
▌10. Ralph Harvey (R)
▌11. Andrew Jacobs Sr. (D)

==== Iowa ====
▌1. Thomas E. Martin (R)
▌2. Henry O. Talle (R)
▌3. H. R. Gross (R)
▌4. Karl M. LeCompte (R)
▌5. Paul H. Cunningham (R)
▌6. James I. Dolliver (R)
▌7. Ben F. Jensen (R)
▌8. Charles B. Hoeven (R)

==== Kansas ====
▌1. Albert M. Cole (R)
▌2. Errett P. Scrivner (R)
▌3. Herbert Alton Meyer (R), until October 2, 1950

▌Myron V. George (R), from November 7, 1950

▌4. Edward Herbert Rees (R)
▌5. Clifford R. Hope (R)
▌6. Wint Smith (R)

==== Kentucky ====
▌1. Noble J. Gregory (D)
▌2. John A. Whitaker (D)
▌3. Thruston Ballard Morton (R)
▌4. Frank Chelf (D)
▌5. Brent Spence (D)
▌6. Thomas R. Underwood (D)
▌7. Carl D. Perkins (D)
▌8. Joe B. Bates (D)
▌9. James S. Golden (R)

==== Louisiana ====
▌1. F. Edward Hébert (D)
▌2. Hale Boggs (D)
▌3. Edwin E. Willis (D)
▌4. Overton Brooks (D)
▌5. Otto Passman (D)
▌6. James H. Morrison (D)
▌7. Henry D. Larcade Jr. (D)
▌8. A. Leonard Allen (D)

==== Maine ====
▌1. Robert Hale (R)
▌2. Charles P. Nelson (R)
▌3. Frank Fellows (R)

==== Maryland ====
▌1. Edward Tylor Miller (R)
▌2. William P. Bolton (D)
▌3. Edward Garmatz (D)
▌4. George Hyde Fallon (D)
▌5. Lansdale G. Sasscer (D)
▌6. James Glenn Beall (R)

==== Massachusetts ====
▌1. John W. Heselton (R)
▌2. Foster Furcolo (D)
▌3. Philip J. Philbin (D)
▌4. Harold Donohue (D)
▌5. Edith Nourse Rogers (R)
▌6. George J. Bates (R), until November 1, 1949

▌William H. Bates (R), from February 14, 1950

▌7. Thomas J. Lane (D)
▌8. Angier Goodwin (R)
▌9. Donald W. Nicholson (R)
▌10. Christian Herter (R)
▌11. John F. Kennedy (D)
▌12. John W. McCormack (D)
▌13. Richard B. Wigglesworth (R)
▌14. Joseph W. Martin Jr. (R)

==== Michigan ====
▌1. George G. Sadowski (D)
▌2. Earl C. Michener (R)
▌3. Paul W. Shafer (R)
▌4. Clare E. Hoffman (R)
▌5. Gerald Ford (R)
▌6. William W. Blackney (R)
▌7. Jesse P. Wolcott (R)
▌8. Fred L. Crawford (R)
▌9. Albert J. Engel (R)
▌10. Roy O. Woodruff (R)
▌11. Charles E. Potter (R)
▌12. John B. Bennett (R)
▌13. George D. O'Brien (D)
▌14. Louis C. Rabaut (D)
▌15. John D. Dingell Sr. (D)
▌16. John Lesinski Sr. (D), until May 27, 1950
▌17. George A. Dondero (R)

==== Minnesota ====
▌1. August H. Andresen (R)
▌2. Joseph P. O'Hara (R)
▌3. Roy Wier (DFL)
▌4. Eugene McCarthy (DFL)
▌5. Walter Judd (R)
▌6. Fred Marshall (DFL)
▌7. Herman Carl Andersen (R)
▌8. John Blatnik (DFL)
▌9. Harold Hagen (R)

==== Mississippi ====
▌1. John E. Rankin (D)
▌2. Jamie L. Whitten (D)
▌3. William M. Whittington (D)
▌4. Thomas Abernethy (D)
▌5. W. Arthur Winstead (D)
▌6. William M. Colmer (D)
▌7. John Bell Williams (D)

==== Missouri ====
▌1. Clare Magee (D)
▌2. Morgan M. Moulder (D)
▌3. Phil J. Welch (D)
▌4. Leonard Irving (D)
▌5. Richard Walker Bolling (D)
▌6. George H. Christopher (D)
▌7. Dewey Short (R)
▌8. A. S. J. Carnahan (D)
▌9. Clarence Cannon (D)
▌10. Paul C. Jones (D)
▌11. John B. Sullivan (D)
▌12. Raymond W. Karst (D)
▌13. Frank M. Karsten (D)

==== Montana ====
▌1. Mike Mansfield (D)
▌2. Wesley A. D'Ewart (R)

==== Nebraska ====
▌1. Carl Curtis (R)
▌2. Eugene D. O'Sullivan (D)
▌3. Karl Stefan (R)
▌4. Arthur L. Miller (R)

==== Nevada ====
▌At-large. Walter S. Baring Jr. (D)

==== New Hampshire ====
▌1. Chester Earl Merrow (R)
▌2. Norris Cotton (R)

==== New Jersey ====
▌1. Charles A. Wolverton (R)
▌2. T. Millet Hand (R)
▌3. James C. Auchincloss (R)
▌4. Charles R. Howell (D)
▌5. Charles A. Eaton (R)
▌6. Clifford P. Case (R)
▌7. J. Parnell Thomas (R), until January 2, 1950

▌William B. Widnall (R), from February 6, 1950

▌8. Gordon Canfield (R)
▌9. Harry L. Towe (R)
▌10. Peter W. Rodino (D)
▌11. Hugh Joseph Addonizio (D)
▌12. Robert Kean (R)
▌13. Mary T. Norton (D)
▌14. Edward J. Hart (D)

==== New Mexico ====
▌At-large. John E. Miles (D)
▌At-large. Antonio M. Fernández (D)

==== New York ====
▌1. W. Kingsland Macy (R)
▌2. Leonard W. Hall (R)
▌3. Henry J. Latham (R)
▌4. L. Gary Clemente (D)
▌5. T. Vincent Quinn (D)
▌6. James J. Delaney (D)
▌7. Louis B. Heller (D), from February 15, 1949
▌8. Joseph L. Pfeifer (D)
▌9. Eugene J. Keogh (D)
▌10. Andrew L. Somers (D), until April 6, 1949

▌Edna F. Kelly (D), from November 8, 1949

▌11. James J. Heffernan (D)
▌12. John J. Rooney (D)
▌13. Donald L. O'Toole (D)
▌14. Abraham J. Multer (D)
▌15. Emanuel Celler (D)
▌16. James J. Murphy (D)
▌17. Frederic René Coudert Jr. (R)
▌18. Vito Marcantonio (AL)
▌19. Arthur George Klein (D)
▌20. Sol Bloom (D), until March 7, 1949

▌Franklin Delano Roosevelt Jr. (Lib.), from May 17, 1949

▌21. Jacob Javits (R)
▌22. Adam Clayton Powell Jr. (D)
▌23. Walter A. Lynch (D)
▌24. Isidore Dollinger (D)
▌25. Charles A. Buckley (D)
▌26. Christopher C. McGrath (D)
▌27. Ralph W. Gwinn (R)
▌28. Ralph A. Gamble (R)
▌29. Katharine St. George (R)
▌30. Jay Le Fevre (R)
▌31. Bernard W. Kearney (R)
▌32. William T. Byrne (D)
▌33. Dean P. Taylor (R)
▌34. Clarence E. Kilburn (R)
▌35. John C. Davies II (D)
▌36. R. Walter Riehlman (R)
▌37. Edwin Arthur Hall (R)
▌38. John Taber (R)
▌39. W. Sterling Cole (R)
▌40. Kenneth Keating (R)
▌41. James W. Wadsworth Jr. (R)
▌42. William L. Pfeiffer (R)
▌43. Anthony F. Tauriello (D)
▌44. Chester C. Gorski (D)
▌45. Daniel A. Reed (R)

==== North Carolina ====
▌1. Herbert Covington Bonner (D)
▌2. John H. Kerr (D)
▌3. Graham A. Barden (D)
▌4. Harold D. Cooley (D)
▌5. Richard Thurmond Chatham (D)
▌6. Carl T. Durham (D)
▌7. Frank Ertel Carlyle (D)
▌8. Charles B. Deane (D)
▌9. Robert L. Doughton (D)
▌10. Hamilton C. Jones (D)
▌11. Alfred L. Bulwinkle (D), until August 31, 1950

▌Woodrow W. Jones (D), from November 7, 1950

▌12. Monroe Minor Redden (D)

==== North Dakota ====
▌At-large. William Lemke (R), until May 30, 1950
▌At-large. Usher L. Burdick (R-NPL)

==== Ohio ====
▌1. Charles H. Elston (R)
▌2. Earl T. Wagner (D)
▌3. Edward G. Breen (D)
▌4. William Moore McCulloch (R)
▌5. Cliff Clevenger (R)
▌6. James G. Polk (D)
▌7. Clarence J. Brown (R)
▌8. Frederick Cleveland Smith (R)
▌9. Thomas H. Burke (D)
▌10. Thomas A. Jenkins (R)
▌11. Walter E. Brehm (R)
▌12. John M. Vorys (R)
▌13. Alvin F. Weichel (R)
▌14. Walter B. Huber (D)
▌15. Robert T. Secrest (D)
▌16. John McSweeney (D)
▌17. J. Harry McGregor (R)
▌18. Wayne Hays (D)
▌19. Michael J. Kirwan (D)
▌20. Michael A. Feighan (D)
▌21. Robert Crosser (D)
▌22. Frances P. Bolton (R)
▌At-large. Stephen M. Young (D)

==== Oklahoma ====
▌1. Dixie Gilmer (D)
▌2. William G. Stigler (D)
▌3. Carl Albert (D)
▌4. Tom Steed (D)
▌5. A. S. Mike Monroney (D)
▌6. Toby Morris (D)
▌7. Victor Wickersham (D)
▌8. George H. Wilson (D)

==== Oregon ====
▌1. A. Walter Norblad (R)
▌2. Lowell Stockman (R)
▌3. Homer D. Angell (R)
▌4. Harris Ellsworth (R)

==== Pennsylvania ====
▌1. William A. Barrett (D)
▌2. William T. Granahan (D)
▌3. Hardie Scott (R)
▌4. Earl Chudoff (D)
▌5. William J. Green Jr. (D)
▌6. Hugh Scott (R)
▌7. Benjamin F. James (R)
▌8. Franklin H. Lichtenwalter (R)
▌9. Paul B. Dague (R)
▌10. Harry P. O'Neill (D)
▌11. Dan Flood (D)
▌12. Ivor D. Fenton (R)
▌13. George M. Rhodes (D)
▌14. Wilson D. Gillette (R)
▌15. Robert F. Rich (R)
▌16. Samuel K. McConnell Jr. (R)
▌17. Richard M. Simpson (R)
▌18. John C. Kunkel (R)
▌19. Leon H. Gavin (R)
▌20. Francis E. Walter (D)
▌21. James F. Lind (D)
▌22. James E. Van Zandt (R)
▌23. Anthony Cavalcante (D)
▌24. Thomas E. Morgan (D)
▌25. Louis E. Graham (R)
▌26. Robert L. Coffey (D), until April 20, 1949

▌John P. Saylor (R), from September 13, 1949

▌27. Augustine B. Kelley (D)
▌28. Carroll D. Kearns (R)
▌29. Harry J. Davenport (D)
▌30. Robert J. Corbett (R)
▌31. James G. Fulton (R)
▌32. Herman P. Eberharter (D)
▌33. Frank Buchanan (D)

==== Rhode Island ====
▌1. Aime Forand (D)
▌2. John E. Fogarty (D)

==== South Carolina ====
▌1. L. Mendel Rivers (D)
▌2. Hugo S. Sims Jr. (D)
▌3. James Butler Hare (D)
▌4. Joseph R. Bryson (D)
▌5. James P. Richards (D)
▌6. John L. McMillan (D)

==== South Dakota ====
▌1. Harold Lovre (R)
▌2. Francis Case (R)

==== Tennessee ====
▌1. Dayton E. Phillips (R)
▌2. John Jennings Jr. (R)
▌3. James B. Frazier Jr. (D)
▌4. Albert Gore Sr. (D)
▌5. Joe L. Evins (D)
▌6. Percy Priest (D)
▌7. James Patrick Sutton (D)
▌8. Tom J. Murray (D)
▌9. Jere Cooper (D)
▌10. Clifford Davis (D)

==== Texas ====
▌1. Wright Patman (D)
▌2. Jesse M. Combs (D)
▌3. Lindley Beckworth (D)
▌4. Sam Rayburn (D)
▌5. Joseph Franklin Wilson (D)
▌6. Olin E. Teague (D)
▌7. Tom Pickett (D)
▌8. Albert Thomas (D)
▌9. Clark W. Thompson (D)
▌10. Homer Thornberry (D)
▌11. William R. Poage (D)
▌12. Wingate H. Lucas (D)
▌13. Ed Gossett (D)
▌14. John E. Lyle Jr. (D)
▌15. Lloyd Bentsen (D)
▌16. Kenneth M. Regan (D)
▌17. Omar Burleson (D)
▌18. Eugene Worley (D), until April 3, 1950

▌Ben H. Guill (R), from May 6, 1950

▌19. George H. Mahon (D)
▌20. Paul J. Kilday (D)
▌21. O. C. Fisher (D)

==== Utah ====
▌1. Walter K. Granger (D)
▌2. Reva Beck Bosone (D)

==== Vermont ====
▌At-large. Charles A. Plumley (R)

==== Virginia ====
▌1. S. Otis Bland (D), until February 16, 1950

▌Edward J. Robeson Jr. (D), from May 2, 1950

▌2. Porter Hardy Jr. (D)
▌3. J. Vaughan Gary (D)
▌4. Watkins Abbitt (D)
▌5. Thomas B. Stanley (D)
▌6. Clarence G. Burton (D)
▌7. Burr Harrison (D)
▌8. Howard W. Smith (D)
▌9. Thomas B. Fugate (D)

==== Washington ====
▌1. Hugh Mitchell (D)
▌2. Henry M. Jackson (D)
▌3. Russell V. Mack (R)
▌4. Hal Holmes (R)
▌5. Walt Horan (R)
▌6. Thor C. Tollefson (R)

==== West Virginia ====
▌1. Robert L. Ramsay (D)
▌2. Harley Orrin Staggers (D)
▌3. Cleveland M. Bailey (D)
▌4. Maurice G. Burnside (D)
▌5. John Kee (D)
▌6. E. H. Hedrick (D)

==== Wisconsin ====
▌1. Lawrence H. Smith (R)
▌2. Glenn Robert Davis (R)
▌3. Gardner R. Withrow (R)
▌4. Clement J. Zablocki (D)
▌5. Andrew J. Biemiller (D)
▌6. Frank Bateman Keefe (R)
▌7. Reid F. Murray (R)
▌8. John W. Byrnes (R)
▌9. Merlin Hull (R)
▌10. Alvin O'Konski (R)

==== Wyoming ====
▌At-large. Frank A. Barrett (R), until December 31, 1950

==== Non-voting members ====
▌Alaska Territory. Bob Bartlett (D)
▌Hawaii Territory. Joseph Rider Farrington (R)
▌▌Puerto Rico. Antonio Fernós-Isern (PPD/D)

House majority leaders

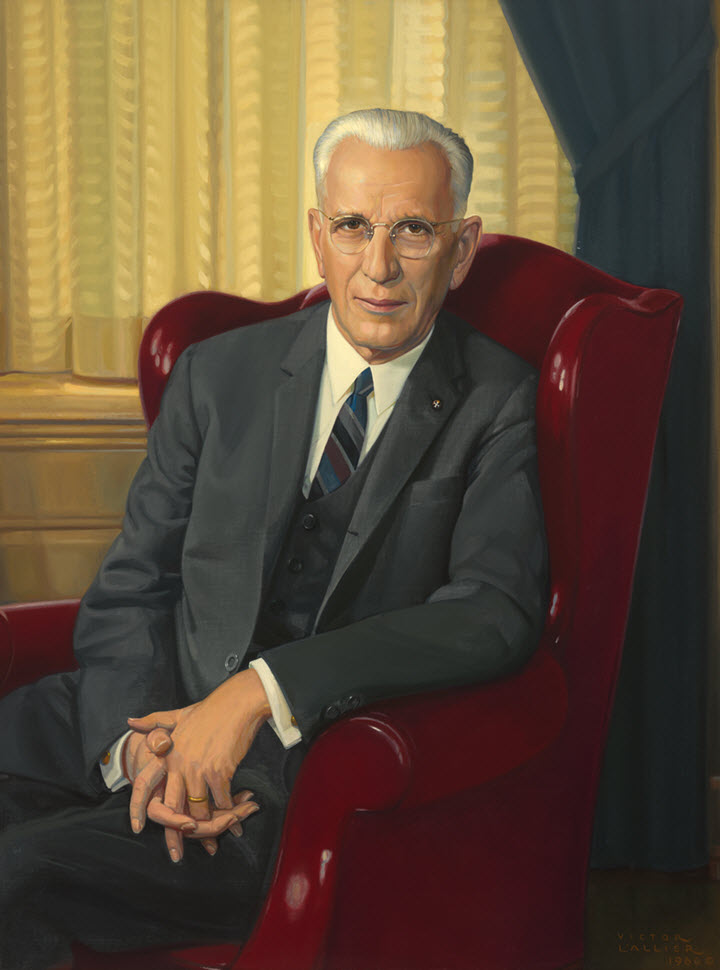
Democratic Leader
John W. McCormack

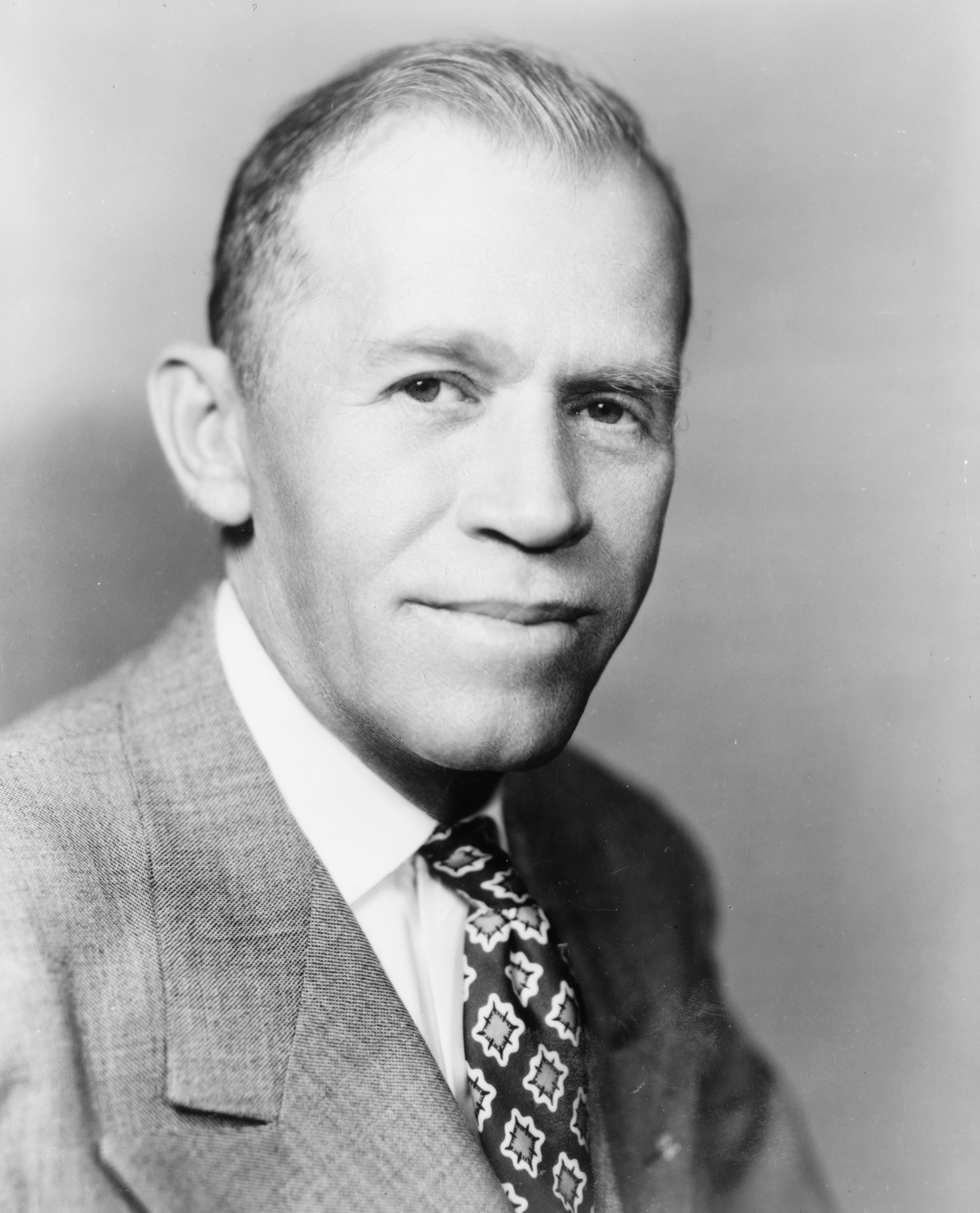
Democratic Whip
Percy Priest

House minority leaders

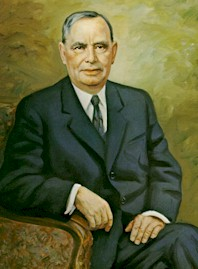
Republican Leader
Joseph W. Martin Jr.

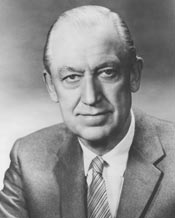
Republican Whip
Leslie C. Arends

== Changes in membership ==
The count below reflects changes from the beginning of this Congress.

=== Senate ===
Senate changes
State (class)	Vacated by	Reason for change	Successor	Date of successor's formal installation (Note: When seated or oath administered, not necessarily when service began.)
Kentucky (3)	Alben W. Barkley (D)	Incumbent resigned January 19, 1949, to become U.S. Vice President. Successor appointed January 20, 1949, to finish the term.	Garrett Withers (D)	January 20, 1949
North Carolina (2)	J. Melville Broughton (D)	Incumbent died March 6, 1949. Successor appointed March 29, 1949, to continue the term.	Frank Porter Graham (D)	March 29, 1949
New York (3)	Robert F. Wagner (D)	Incumbent resigned June 28, 1949, due to ill health. Successor appointed July 7, 1949, to continue the term.	John Foster Dulles (R)	July 7, 1949
Rhode Island (1)	J. Howard McGrath (D)	Incumbent resigned August 23, 1949, to become U.S. Attorney General. Successor appointed to continue the term.	Edward L. Leahy (D)	August 24, 1949
Idaho (2)	Bert H. Miller (D)	Incumbent died October 8, 1949. Successor appointed to continue the term. Successor later elected November 7, 1950.	Henry Dworshak (R)	October 14, 1949
Kansas (3)	Clyde M. Reed (R)	Incumbent died November 8, 1949. Successor appointed to continue the term.	Harry Darby (R)	December 2, 1949
New York (3)	John Foster Dulles (R)	Interim appointee lost November 8, 1949, election to finish the term. Successor elected November 8, 1949.	Herbert H. Lehman (D)	November 9, 1949
Connecticut (1)	Raymond E. Baldwin (R)	Incumbent resigned December 16, 1949. Successor appointed to continue the term. Successor later elected November 7, 1950.	William Benton (D)	December 17, 1949
Kentucky (3)	Garrett Withers (D)	Interim appointee resigned November 26, 1950, to trigger special election. Successor elected November 7, 1950.	Earle Clements (D)	November 27, 1950
North Carolina (2)	Frank Porter Graham (D)	Interim appointee lost November 7, 1950, election to finish the term. Successor elected November 7, 1950.	Willis Smith (D)	November 27, 1950
Kansas (3)	Harry Darby (R)	Interim appointee retired November 28, 1950, when successor elected. Successor elected November 29, 1950.	Frank Carlson (R)	November 29, 1950
California (3)	Sheridan Downey (D)	Incumbent resigned November 30, 1950, due to ill health. Successor appointed to finish term, having already been elected to the next term.	Richard Nixon (R)	December 1, 1950
Rhode Island (1)	Edward L. Leahy (D)	Interim appointee retired December 18, 1950, when successor elected. Successor elected December 19, 1950.	John Pastore (D)	December 19, 1950

=== House of Representatives ===
House changes
District	Vacated by	Reason for change	Successor	Date of successor's formal installation
New York 7th	Vacant	Rep. John J. Delaney died during previous congress	Louis B. Heller (D)	February 15, 1949
New York 20th	Sol Bloom (D)	Died March 7, 1949.	Franklin Delano Roosevelt Jr. (Lib)	May 17, 1949
New York 10th	Andrew Lawrence Somers (D)	Died April 6, 1949.	Edna F. Kelly (D)	November 8, 1949
Pennsylvania 26th	Robert L. Coffey (D)	Died April 20, 1949.	John P. Saylor (R)	September 13, 1949
California 5th	Richard J. Welch (R)	Died September 10, 1949.	John F. Shelley (D)	November 8, 1949
Massachusetts 6th	George J. Bates (R)	Died November 1, 1949.	William H. Bates (R)	February 14, 1950
Illinois 5th	Martin Gorski (D)	Died December 4, 1949.	Vacant	Not filled for the remainder of this term
New Jersey 7th	J. Parnell Thomas (R)	Resigned January 2, 1950, following conviction on charges of salary fraud.	William B. Widnall (R)	February 6, 1950
Virginia 1st	S. Otis Bland (D)	Died February 16, 1950.	Edward J. Robeson Jr. (D)	May 2, 1950
Illinois 13th	Ralph E. Church (R)	Died March 21, 1950.	Vacant	Not filled for the remainder of this term
Texas 18th	Eugene Worley (D)	Resigned April 3, 1950, to become associate judge of the United States Court of Customs and Patent Appeals.	Ben H. Guill (R)	May 6, 1950
Michigan 16th	John Lesinski Sr. (D)	Died May 27, 1950.	Vacant	Not filled for the remainder of this term
North Dakota at-large	William Lemke (R)	Died May 30, 1950.	Vacant	Not filled for the remainder of this term
North Carolina 11th	Alfred L. Bulwinkle (D)	Died August 31, 1950.	Woodrow W. Jones (D)	November 7, 1950
Kansas 3rd	Herbert Alton Meyer (R)	Died October 2, 1950.	Myron V. George (R)	November 7, 1950
California 12th	Richard Nixon (R)	Resigned November 30, 1950, after being appointed to the U.S. Senate having already been elected.	Vacant	Not filled for the remainder of this term
Wyoming at-large	Frank A. Barrett (R)	Resigned December 31, 1950, after being elected Governor of Wyoming.	Vacant	Not filled for the remainder of this term

== Committees ==
Lists of committees and their party leaders for members of the House and Senate committees can be found through the Official Congressional Directory at the bottom of this article. The directory after the pages of terms of service lists committees of the Senate, House (Standing with Subcommittees, Select and Special) and Joint and, after that, House/Senate committee assignments. On the committees section of the House and Senate in the Official Congressional Directory, the committee's members on the first row on the left side shows the chairman of the committee and on the right side shows the ranking member of the committee.

=== Senate ===
- Agriculture and Forestry (Chairman: Elmer Thomas; Ranking Member: George D. Aiken)
- Appropriations (Chairman: Kenneth McKellar; Ranking Member: Styles Bridges)
- Armed Services (Chairman: Millard E. Tydings; Ranking Member: Styles Bridges)
- Banking and Currency (Chairman: Burnet R. Maybank; Ranking Member: Charles W. Tobey)
- District of Columbia (Chairman: Matthew M. Neely; Ranking Member: John J. Williams)
- Expenditures in Executive Departments (Chairman: John L. McClellan; Ranking Member: Joseph R. McCarthy)
- Finance (Chairman: Walter F. George; Ranking Member: Eugene D. Millikin)
- Foreign Relations (Chairman: Tom Connally; Ranking Member: Arthur H. Vandenberg)
- Interior and Insular Affairs (Chairman: Joseph C. O'Mahoney; Ranking Member: Hugh Butler)
- Subcommittee on Internal Security
- Interstate and Foreign Commerce (Chairman: Edwin C. Johnson; Ranking Member: Charles W. Tobey)
- Judiciary (Chairman: Pat McCarran; Ranking Member: Alexander Wiley)
- Labor and Public Welfare (Chairman: Elbert D. Thomas; Ranking Member: Robert A. Taft)
- Organized Crime in Interstate Commerce (Select)
- Post Office and Civil Service (Chairman: Frank Carlson; Ranking Member: Olin D. Johnston)
- Public Works (Chairman: Dennis Chavez; Ranking Member: William Langer)
- Remodeling the Senate Chamber (Special)
- Rules and Administration (Chairman: Carl Hayden; Ranking Member: Kenneth S. Wherry)
- Small Business (Select)
- Small Business Enterprises (Special)
- Whole

=== House of Representatives ===
- Agriculture (Chairman: Harold D. Cooley; Ranking Member: Clifford R. Hope)
- Appropriations (Chairman: Clarence Cannon; Ranking Member: John Taber)
- Armed Services (Chairman: Carl Vinson; Ranking Member: Dewey Jackson Short)
- Banking and Currency (Chairman: Brent Spence; Ranking Member: Jesse P. Wolcott)
- District of Columbia (Chairman: John L. McMillan; Ranking Member: George J. Bates)
- Education and Labor (Chairman: John Lesinski; Ranking Member: Samuel K. McConnell Jr.)
- Expenditures in the Executive Departments (Chairman: William L. Dawson; Ranking Member: Clare E. Hoffman)
- Foreign Affairs (Chairman: John Kee; Ranking Member: Charles Aubrey Eaton)
- House Administration (Chairman: Mary Teresa Norton; Ranking Member: Karl M. LeCompte)
- Investigate Educational, Training, and Loan Guaranty Programs under the G.I. Bill (Select) (Chairman: Olin E. Teague)
- Investigate the Use of Chemicals in Food and Cosmetics (Select) (Chairman: N/A)
- Interstate and Foreign Commerce (Chairman: Robert Crosser; Ranking Member: Charles A. Wolverton)
- Judiciary (Chairman: Emanuel Celler; Ranking: Earl C. Michener)
- Lobbying Activities (Select) (Chairman: Frank Buchanan)
- Merchant Marine and Fisheries (Chairman: S. Otis Bland; Ranking Member: Alvin F. Weichel)
- Post Office and Civil Service (Chairman: Tom J. Murray; Ranking Member: Edward H. Rees)
- Public Lands (Chairman: J. Hardin Peterson; Ranking Member: Richard J. Welch then Fred L. Crawford)
- Public Works (Chairman: William M. Whittington; Ranking Member: George Anthony Dondero)
- Rules (Chairman: Adolph J. Sabath; Ranking Member: Leo E. Allen)
- Small Business (Select) (Chairman: Wright Patman)
- Standards of Official Conduct
- Un-American Activities (Chairman: John S. Wood; Ranking Member: J. Parnell Thomas)
- Veterans' Affairs (Chairman: John E. Rankin; Ranking Member: Edith Nourse Rogers)
- Ways and Means (Chairman: Robert L. Doughton; Ranking Member: Daniel A. Reed)
- Whole

=== Joint committees ===
- Atomic Energy (Chairman: Sen. Brien McMahon; Vice Chairman: Rep. Carl T. Durham)
- Conditions of Indian Tribes (Special)
- Defense Production
- Disposition of Executive Papers
- Foreign Economic Cooperation (Chairman: Sen. Pat McCarran)
- Economic (Chairman: Sen. Joseph C. O'Mahoney; Vice Chairman: Rep. Edward J. Hart)
- Labor Management Relations (Chairman: Sen. James E. Murray; Vice Chairman: Rep. John Lesinski)
- Legislative Budget
- The Library (Chairman: Sen. Theodore F. Green)
- Navajo-Hopi Indian Administration
- Arrange the Inauguration for President-elect (Chairman: Sen. Carl Hayden)
- Printing (Chairman: Sen. Carl Hayden; Vice Chairman: Rep. Mary Teresa Norton)
- Reduction of Nonessential Federal Expenditures
- Taxation (Chairman: Rep. Robert L. Doughton; Vice Chairman: Sen. Walter F. George)

== Employees ==
=== Legislative branch agency directors ===
- Architect of the Capitol: David Lynn
- Attending Physician of the United States Congress: George Calver
- Comptroller General of the United States: Lindsay C. Warren
- Librarian of Congress: Luther H. Evans
- Public Printer of the United States: John J. Deviny

=== Senate ===
- Chaplain: Peter Marshall (Presbyterian), until January 26, 1949
  - Frederick Brown Harris (Methodist), from February 3, 1949
- Parliamentarian: Charles Watkins
- Secretary: Leslie Biffle
- Librarian: George W. Straubinger
- Secretary for the Majority: Felton McLellan Johnston
- Secretary for the Minority: J. Mark Trice
- Sergeant at Arms: Joseph C. Duke

=== House of Representatives ===
- Chaplain: James Shera Montgomery (Methodist), until January 3, 1950
  - Bernard Braskamp (Presbyterian), from January 3, 1950
- Clerk: Ralph R. Roberts
- Doorkeeper: William Mosley "Fishbait" Miller
- Parliamentarian: Lewis Deschler
- Postmaster: Finis E. Scott
- Reading Clerks: George J. Maurer (D) and Alney E. Chaffee (R)
- Sergeant at Arms: Joseph H. Callahan

== See also ==
- 1948 United States elections (elections leading to this Congress)
  - 1948 United States presidential election
  - 1948 United States Senate elections
  - 1948 United States House of Representatives elections
- 1950 United States elections (elections during this Congress, leading to the next Congress)
  - 1950 United States Senate elections
  - 1950 United States House of Representatives elections
