= Judge Hatfield =

Judge Hatfield may refer to:

- Charles Sherrod Hatfield (1882–1950), associate judge of the United States Court of Customs and Patent Appeals
- Paul G. Hatfield (1928–2000), judge of the United States District Court for the District of Montana
