= Judge Lane =

Judge Lane may refer to:

- Arthur Stephen Lane (1910–1997), judge of the United States District Court for the District of New Jersey
- Donald Edward Lane (1909–1979), associate judge of the United States Court of Customs and Patent Appeals
- George Washington Lane (1806–1863), judge of the United States District Courts for the Northern, Middle, and Southern Districts of Alabama

== See also ==
- Geoffrey Lane, Baron Lane (1918–2005), Lord Chief Justice of England
