= William J. Graham =

American politician and jurist (1872-1937)

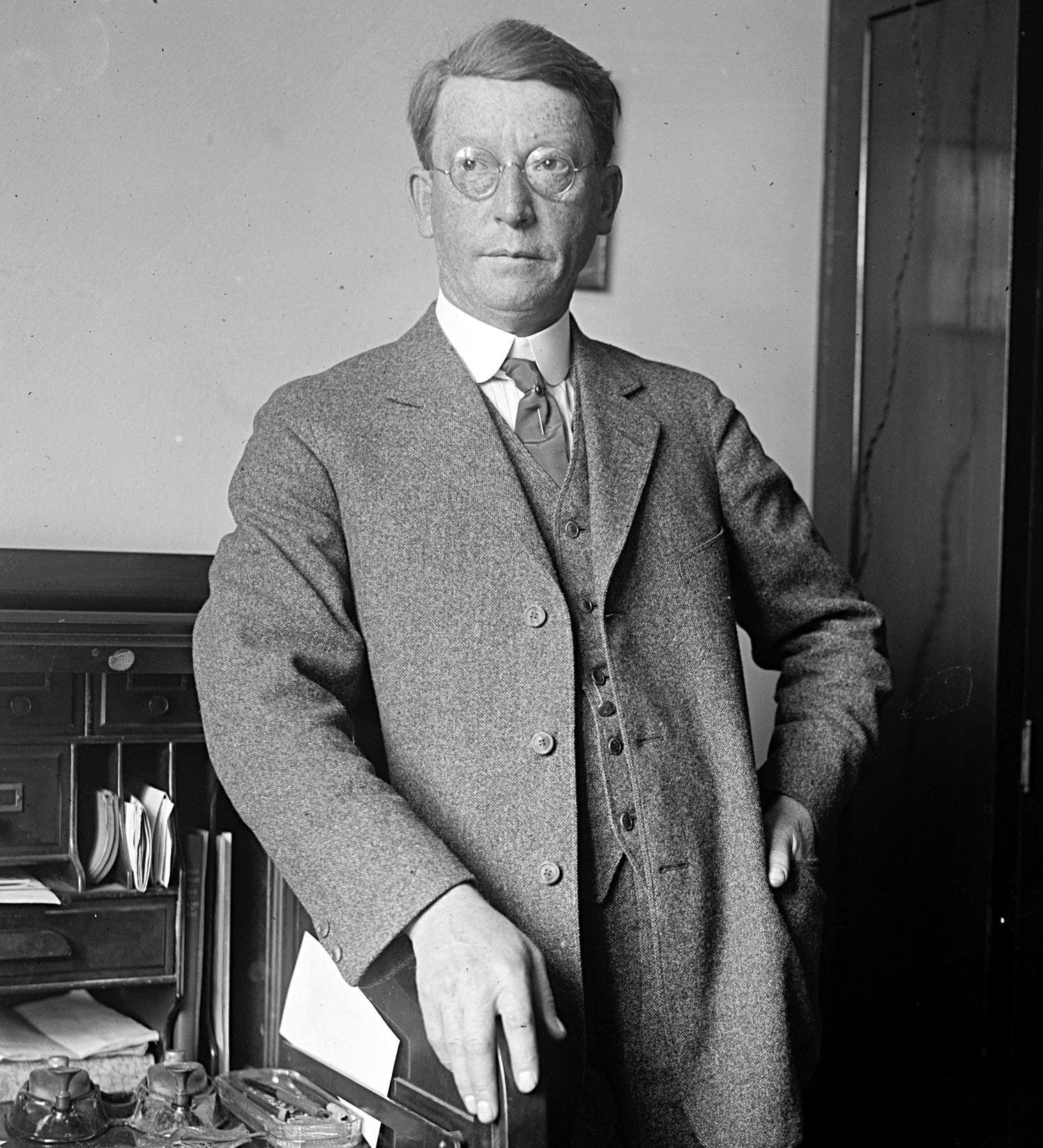

Presiding Judge of the United States Court of Customs and Patent Appeals
- In office May 29, 1924 – November 10, 1937
- Appointed by: Calvin Coolidge
- Preceded by: George Ewing Martin
- Succeeded by: Finis J. Garrett

Member of the U.S. House of Representatives from Illinois's 14th district
- In office March 4, 1917 – June 7, 1924
- Preceded by: Clyde Howard Tavenner
- Succeeded by: John Clayton Allen

Personal details
- Born: William Johnson Graham; February 7, 1872 New Castle, Pennsylvania, U.S.
- Died: November 10, 1937 (aged 65) Washington, D.C., U.S.
- Resting place: Aledo Cemetery; Aledo, Illinois
- Party: Republican
- Education: University of Illinois Urbana-Champaign (B.L.)

William Johnson Graham (February 7, 1872 – November 10, 1937) was a United States representative from Illinois and presiding judge of the United States Court of Customs and Patent Appeals.

== Education and career ==
Born on February 7, 1872, in New Castle, Pennsylvania, Graham moved to Illinois with his parents, who settled near Aledo, Mercer County, Illinois in 1879, and attended the public schools. He received a Bachelor of Laws in 1893 from the University of Illinois Urbana-Champaign and read law in 1895. He was admitted to the bar and entered private practice in Aledo starting in 1895. He was state's attorney for Mercer County from 1901 to 1909. He was a delegate to the Republican National Convention in 1912. He was a member of the Illinois House of Representatives from 1915 to 1916.

== Congressional service ==
Graham was elected as a Republican to the 65th United States Congress and to the three succeeding Congresses and served from March 4, 1917, to June 7, 1924, when he resigned to accept a federal judicial post. He served as Chairman of the Committee on Expenditures in the United States Department of War during the 66th United States Congress.

== Federal judicial service ==
Graham was nominated by President Calvin Coolidge on May 26, 1924, to the Presiding Judge seat on the United States Court of Customs Appeals (United States Court of Customs and Patent Appeals from March 2, 1929) vacated by Presiding Judge George Ewing Martin. He was confirmed by the United States Senate on May 29, 1924, and received his commission the same day. His service terminated on November 10, 1937, due to his death after suffering a heart attack at his home in Washington, D.C. His remains were cremated and the ashes interred in Aledo Cemetery in Aledo.

U.S. House of Representatives
| Preceded by Clyde Howard Tavenner | Member of the United States House of Representatives from Illinois's 14th congressional district 1917–1924 | Succeeded by John Clayton Allen |
| Preceded by Peter J. Dooling | Chairman of the House War Expenditures Committee; 1919–1921 | Succeeded by Royal C. Johnson |
Legal offices
| Preceded by George Ewing Martin | Presiding Judge of the United States Court of Customs and Patent Appeals; 1924–1937 | Succeeded by Finis J. Garrett |
