= Walter E. Rogers =

American politician

Walter Edward Rogers
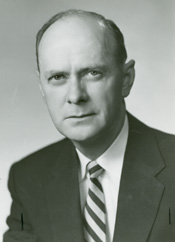

Member of the U.S. House of Representatives from Texas's 18th district
- In office January 3, 1951 – January 3, 1967
- Preceded by: Ben H. Guill
- Succeeded by: Bob Price

Personal details
- Born: July 19, 1908 Texarkana, Arkansas
- Died: May 31, 2001 (aged 92) Naples, Florida
- Resting place: Naples Memorial Garden; Naples, Florida
- Party: Democratic
- Education: Austin College; University of Texas
- Occupation: Attorney

Walter Edward Rogers (July 19, 1908 – May 31, 2001) was a Democratic United States Representative from Texas.

He was born in Texarkana, Arkansas in 1908. He received his law degree from the University of Texas in 1935 and became the city attorney for Pampa, Texas three years later.

Rogers was elected to Congress in 1950 and served until he retired in 1967. He was one of five Texas congressmen to sign the Southern Manifesto in 1956, a resolution in protest against the United States Supreme Court decision in Brown v. Board of Education. Rogers was the only member of the combined House of Representatives or Senate to vote against honorary citizenship for Winston Churchill in 1963. On November 22, 1963, Rogers was in the motorcade in Dallas when President Kennedy was assassinated, though four cars back.

The congressman died on May 31, 2001, in Naples, Florida, at the age of 92.

U.S. House of Representatives
Preceded by Ben H. Guill	Member of the U.S. House of Representatives from Texas's 18th congressional district 1951–1967	Succeeded by Bob Price
