= Helen W. Nies =

American judge (1925–1996)

Senior Judge of the United States Court of Appeals for the Federal Circuit
- In office November 1, 1995 – August 7, 1996

Chief Judge of the United States Court of Appeals for the Federal Circuit
- In office June 27, 1990 – March 18, 1994
- Preceded by: Howard Thomas Markey
- Succeeded by: Glenn L. Archer Jr.

Judge of the United States Court of Appeals for the Federal Circuit
- In office October 1, 1982 – November 1, 1995
- Appointed by: operation of law
- Preceded by: Seat established by 96 Stat. 25
- Succeeded by: Arthur J. Gajarsa

Associate Judge of the United States Court of Customs and Patent Appeals
- In office June 18, 1980 – October 1, 1982
- Appointed by: Jimmy Carter
- Preceded by: Donald Edward Lane
- Succeeded by: Seat abolished

Personal details
- Born: August 7, 1925 Birmingham, Alabama, U.S.
- Died: August 7, 1996 (aged 71) Lewes, Delaware, U.S.
- Education: University of Michigan (BA, JD)

Helen Wilson Nies (August 7, 1925 – August 7, 1996) was a United States circuit judge of the United States Court of Appeals for the Federal Circuit after previously serving as a United States Judge of the United States Court of Customs and Patent Appeals.

== Education and career ==
Born in Birmingham, Alabama, Nies received a Bachelor of Arts degree from the University of Michigan in 1946. She received a Juris Doctor from the University of Michigan Law School in 1948, graduating Order of the Coif. She was an attorney of the Office of Alien Property of the United States Department of Justice in Washington, D.C. from 1948 to 1951. She was branch counsel of the United States Office of Price Stabilization in Washington, D.C. from 1951 to 1952. She was in private practice of law as a member of a law firm based in Chicago, Illinois while she worked in Washington, D.C., with an office at The Watergate, from 1960 to 1978. She was in private practice of law in Washington, D.C. from 1978 to 1980.

== Federal judicial service ==
Nies was nominated by President Jimmy Carter on May 9, 1980, to a seat on the United States Court of Customs and Patent Appeals vacated by Judge Donald Edward Lane. She was confirmed by the United States Senate on June 18, 1980, and received her commission on June 18, 1980. Her service terminated on October 1, 1982, due to reassignment to the Federal Circuit.

Nies was reassigned by operation of law on October 1, 1982, to the United States Court of Appeals for the Federal Circuit, to a new seat authorized by 96 Stat. 25. She served as Chief Judge from 1990 to 1994. She assumed senior status on November 1, 1995. Her service terminated on August 7, 1996, due to her death.

== Death ==
She died on August 7, 1996, her 71st birthday, of head injuries sustained in a bicycle crash, in Lewes, Delaware.

Legal offices
Preceded by Donald Edward Lane	Associate Judge of the United States Court of Customs and Patent Appeals; 1980–1982	Succeeded by Seat abolished
Preceded by Seat established by 96 Stat. 25	Judge of the United States Court of Appeals for the Federal Circuit; 1982–1995	Succeeded by Arthur J. Gajarsa
Preceded by Howard Thomas Markey	Chief Judge of the United States Court of Appeals for the Federal Circuit; 1990–1994	Succeeded by Glenn L. Archer Jr.
