= Constantine Joseph Smyth =

American judge (1859–1924)

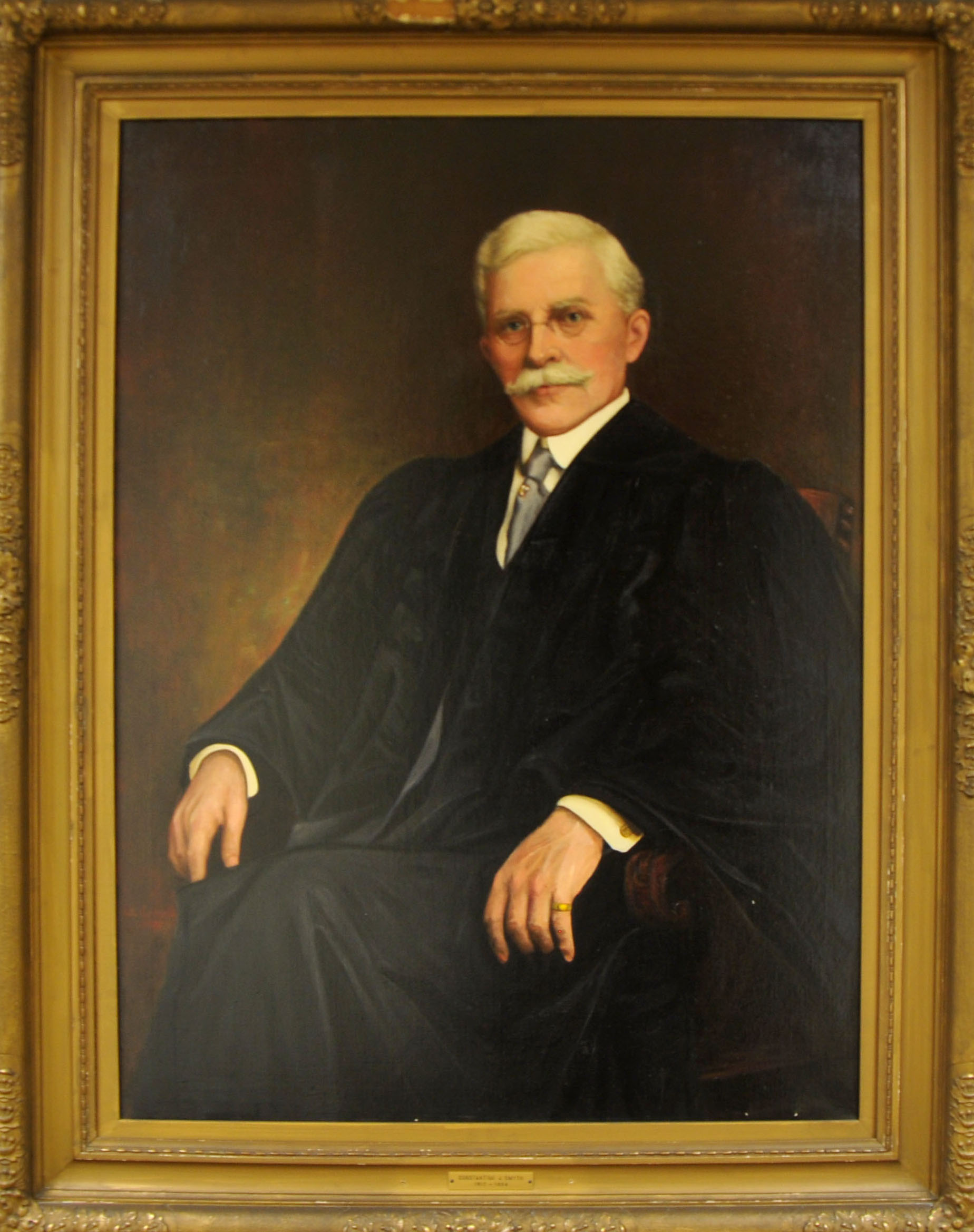

Chief Justice of the Court of Appeals of the District of Columbia
- In office July 12, 1917 – April 14, 1924
- Appointed by: Woodrow Wilson
- Preceded by: Seth Shepard
- Succeeded by: George Ewing Martin

10th Attorney General of Nebraska
- In office January 7, 1897 – January 3, 1901
- Governor: Silas A. Holcomb; William A. Poynter
- Preceded by: Arthur S. Churchill
- Succeeded by: Frank N. Prout

Personal details
- Born: Constantine Joseph Smyth; December 4, 1859 County Cavan, Ireland
- Died: April 14, 1924 (aged 64)
- Party: Democratic
- Education: Creighton University (AM) read law

Constantine Joseph Smyth (December 4, 1859 – April 14, 1924) was Chief Justice of the Court of Appeals of the District of Columbia.

== Education and career ==
Smyth was born in County Cavan, Ireland on December 4, 1859, a son of Brian and Rose (Clark) Smyth. His family came to the United States in 1870, and the family settled in Nebraska. In 1878, Smyth moved to Omaha to attend college. He graduated from Creighton University with an AB degree in 1882. He studied law and was admitted to the bar in 1885. Smyth practiced in Omaha from 1885 to 1913. He was a member of the Nebraska House of Representatives in 1887. He was a member of the Omaha School Board from 1889 to 1894. He was Chairman of the Nebraska State Democratic Committee from 1894 to 1896. He was Attorney General of Nebraska from 1897 to 1900. He was an associate dean and professor at Creighton University School of Law from 1905 to 1910. He received an Artium Magister degree in 1907 from Creighton University. He was a special assistant to the Attorney General of the United States from 1913 to 1917.

== Federal judicial service ==
Smyth was nominated by President Woodrow Wilson on June 29, 1917, to the Chief Justice seat on the Court of Appeals of the District of Columbia vacated by Chief Justice Seth Shepard. He was confirmed by the United States Senate on July 12, 1917, and received his commission the same day. His service terminated on April 14, 1924, due to his death.

== Sources ==
Legal offices
Preceded by Arthur S. Churchill	Attorney General of Nebraska; 1897–1901	Succeeded by Frank N. Prout
Preceded by Seth Shepard	Chief Justice of the Court of Appeals of the District of Columbia; 1917–1924	Succeeded by George Ewing Martin
