= Arthur J. Gajarsa =

American judge (born 1941)

Arthur Gajarsa
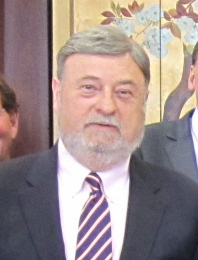
- Gajarsa in 2011

Senior Judge of the United States Court of Appeals for the Federal Circuit
- In office July 31, 2011 – June 30, 2012

Judge of the United States Court of Appeals for the Federal Circuit
- In office September 12, 1997 – July 31, 2011
- Appointed by: Bill Clinton
- Preceded by: Helen W. Nies
- Succeeded by: Evan Wallach

Personal details
- Born: Arthur Joseph Gajarsa; March 1, 1941 (age 84); Norcia, Italy
- Education: Rensselaer Polytechnic Institute (BS); Catholic University (MA); Georgetown University (JD)

Arthur Joseph Gajarsa (born March 1, 1941) is a former United States circuit judge of the United States Court of Appeals for the Federal Circuit.

== Early life and education ==
Gajarsa was born on March 1, 1941, in Norcia, in the province of Perugia, Italy. He was the top ranked student in the 1958 graduating class at Boston Technical High School in Massachusetts. He matriculated at the Rensselaer Polytechnic Institute in Troy, New York, where he was admitted to the Zeta Psi fraternity, graduating in 1962 with a Bachelor of Science degree in electrical engineering. He then received a Master of Arts in economics from the Catholic University of America in 1964, and a Juris Doctor from Georgetown University Law Center in 1967.

== Career ==
Prior to law school, Gajarsa served as a patent examiner with the United States Patent and Trademark Office from 1962 to 1963, and was then a patent adviser to the U.S. Air Force from 1963 to 1964, and a patent adviser to the firm of Cushman, Darby and Cushman from 1964 to 1967. He was a law clerk for Judge Joseph Charles McGarraghy of the United States District Court for the District of Columbia from 1967 to 1968. He was an Attorney with Aetna Life and Casualty, Inc. from 1968 to 1969. He was a special counsel for the Commissioner of Indian Affairs, United States Department of Interior from 1969 to 1970. He was in private practice of law in Washington, D.C., from 1971 to 1997.

== Federal judicial service ==
Gajarsa was nominated by President Bill Clinton on January 7, 1997, to a seat on the United States Court of Appeals for the Federal Circuit vacated by Judge Helen W. Nies. He was confirmed by the United States Senate on July 31, 1997, and received commission on August 1, 1997. He entered service on September 12, 1997. He assumed senior status on July 31, 2011. His service terminated on June 30, 2012, due to retirement.

== Publications ==
He has authored Recent Developments in Antitrust for the American Bar Association in 1967-69, and The European Common Market Antitrust Laws, Catholic University, 1967. He has also published numerous articles on economics and law.

== Post judicial service ==
On November 3, 2010, Rensselaer Polytechnic Institute announced that Gajarsa would replace Samuel F. Heffner as Chairman of the Board at the start of 2011.

In the fall of 2012, Gajarsa joined the University of New Hampshire School of Law as its first Distinguished Jurist-in-Residence at the Franklin Pierce Center for Intellectual Property. In honor of Gajarsa, UNH Law co-founded the Arthur J. Gajarsa American Inn of Court, which is the newest member of the national Linn IP Inn Alliance. The Inn was launched in Concord, New Hampshire, on September 13, 2012.

== Awards and honors ==
- Bausch and Lomb Medal, 1958
- Benjamin Franklin Award, Boston Technical High School, 1958
- JFK Award for Public Service, 1974
- Sun and Balance Medal, Rensselaer Polytechnic Institute, 1990
- Gigi Pieri Award, Camp Hale Association, Boston, MA, 1992
- Rensselaer Key Alumni Award, 1992
- 125th Anniversary Medal, Georgetown University Law Center, 1995
- Order of Commendatore, Republic of Italy, 1995
- Alumni Fellow Award, Rensselaer Alumni Association, 1996
- Albert Fox DeMers Medal, Rensselaer Polytechnic Institute, 1999
- Paul R. Dean Award, Georgetown University Law Center, 1999
- Lifetime Achievement in Jurisprudence & Italian American Leadership, Order Sons of Italy in America, 2009

== Personal life ==
Gajarsa and his wife, Melanie have five children.

Legal offices
Preceded by Helen W. Nies	Judge of the United States Court of Appeals for the Federal Circuit; 1997–2011	Succeeded by Evan Wallach
