= Arthur Mumford Smith =

American judge (1903–1968)

Associate Judge of the United States Court of Customs and Patent Appeals
- In office April 30, 1959 – November 20, 1968
- Appointed by: Dwight D. Eisenhower
- Preceded by: Eugene Worley
- Succeeded by: Donald Edward Lane

Personal details
- Born: Arthur Mumford Smith; September 19, 1903 Scott, Indiana, U.S.
- Died: November 20, 1968 (aged 65) Washington, D.C., U.S.
- Education: University of Michigan (BA, LLB)

Arthur Mumford Smith (September 19, 1903 – November 20, 1968) was an associate judge of the United States Court of Customs and Patent Appeals.

== Education and career ==
Born on September 19, 1903, in Scott, Indiana, Smith received an Artium Baccalaureus degree in 1924 from the University of Michigan and a Bachelor of Laws in 1926 from the University of Michigan Law School. He entered private practice in Chicago, Illinois from 1926 to 1929, Detroit, Michigan from 1929 to 1946, and Dearborn, Michigan from 1946 to 1959. He was a lecturer in patent law at the University of Michigan Law School from 1951 to 1959.

== Federal judicial service ==
Smith was nominated by President Dwight D. Eisenhower on March 25, 1959, to an Associate Judge seat on the United States Court of Customs and Patent Appeals vacated by Judge Eugene Worley. He was confirmed by the United States Senate on April 29, 1959, and received his commission on April 30, 1959. His service terminated on November 20, 1968, due to his death in Washington, D.C.

== Publication ==
In 1957 he authored the frequently cited "Pitfalls in Patent Prosecution" subsequently published in the Journal of the Patent Office Society, volume 41, pgs 5-33 (1959).

Legal offices
Preceded by Eugene Worley	Associate Judge of the United States Court of Customs and Patent Appeals; 1959–1968	Succeeded by Donald Edward Lane
