= Howard Thomas Markey =

American judge

Howard Markey
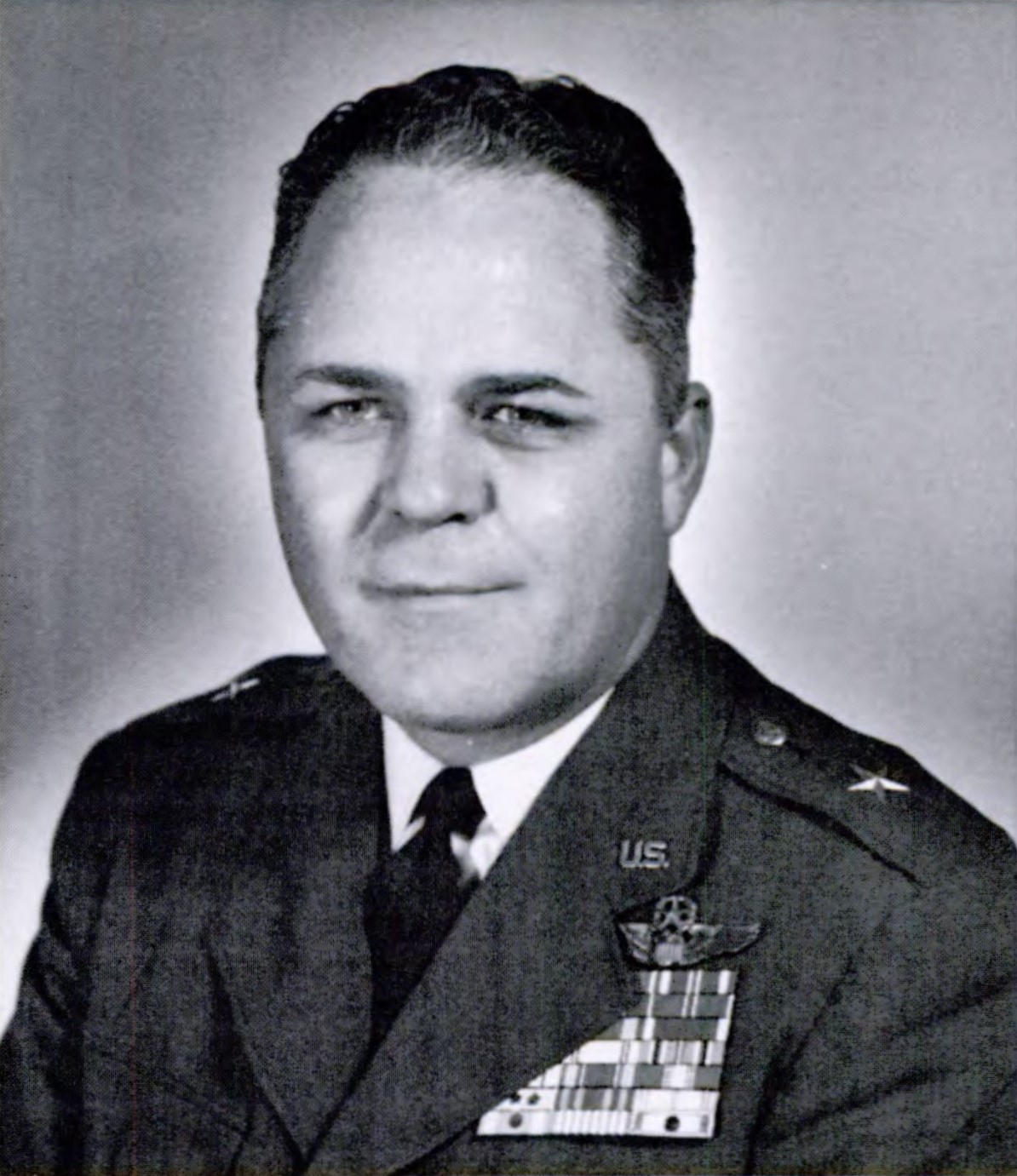
- Markey as a U.S. Air Force Reserve brigadier general

Chief Judge of the United States Court of Appeals for the Federal Circuit
- In office October 1, 1982 – June 27, 1990
- Preceded by: Office established
- Succeeded by: Helen W. Nies

Judge of the United States Court of Appeals for the Federal Circuit
- In office October 1, 1982 – April 30, 1991
- Appointed by: operation of law
- Preceded by: Seat established by 96 Stat. 25
- Succeeded by: William Curtis Bryson

Chief Judge of the United States Court of Customs and Patent Appeals
- In office June 22, 1972 – October 1, 1982
- Appointed by: Richard Nixon
- Preceded by: Eugene Worley
- Succeeded by: Seat abolished

Personal details
- Born: Howard Thomas Markey; November 10, 1920 Chicago, Illinois, U.S.
- Died: May 3, 2006 (aged 85) Hinsdale, Illinois, U.S.
- Education: Loyola University Chicago School of Law (LLB); John Marshall Law School (LLM)

Howard Thomas Markey (November 10, 1920 – May 3, 2006) was an American jurist who served as the first Chief United States circuit judge of the United States Court of Appeals for the Federal Circuit. He is often credited with establishing that court's renown and competence in intellectual property law.

== Early life, military and legal career ==
Markey was born in Chicago, Illinois to Thomas Joseph and Vera Marie (Dryden) Markey. He served in the United States Army Air Forces during World War II as a test pilot, flying P-38s and P-59 jets in extreme cold-weather. He left the army in 1946 as a major, and became a lieutenant colonel in the United States Air Force Reserve. Markey subsequently earned his undergraduate degree and a Bachelor of Laws in an accelerated one-year program at Loyola University Chicago School of Law in 1949, and a Master of Laws in patent law in 1950 from John Marshall Law School in Chicago. He returned to active military service in the Korean War, in which he served as a planner of the Korean Airlift.

Markey returned to Chicago following the war, specializing his private legal practice in patent law and other areas of intellectual property. He remained in the Air Force Reserve, then transferred to the Air National Guard, serving as commander of the Illinois Air National Guard, then returning to the Air Force Reserve as deputy commander of the Air Force Reserve's portion of Tactical Air Command. Markey retired from the Air Force Reserve in 1976 as a major general, having received the Distinguished Service Medal, the Legion of Merit, the Distinguished Flying Cross, the Soldier's Medal, the Bronze Star Medal, the Purple Heart and the Air Medal. He was a lecturer at Loyola University Chicago School of Law from 1971 to 1972.

== Federal judicial service ==
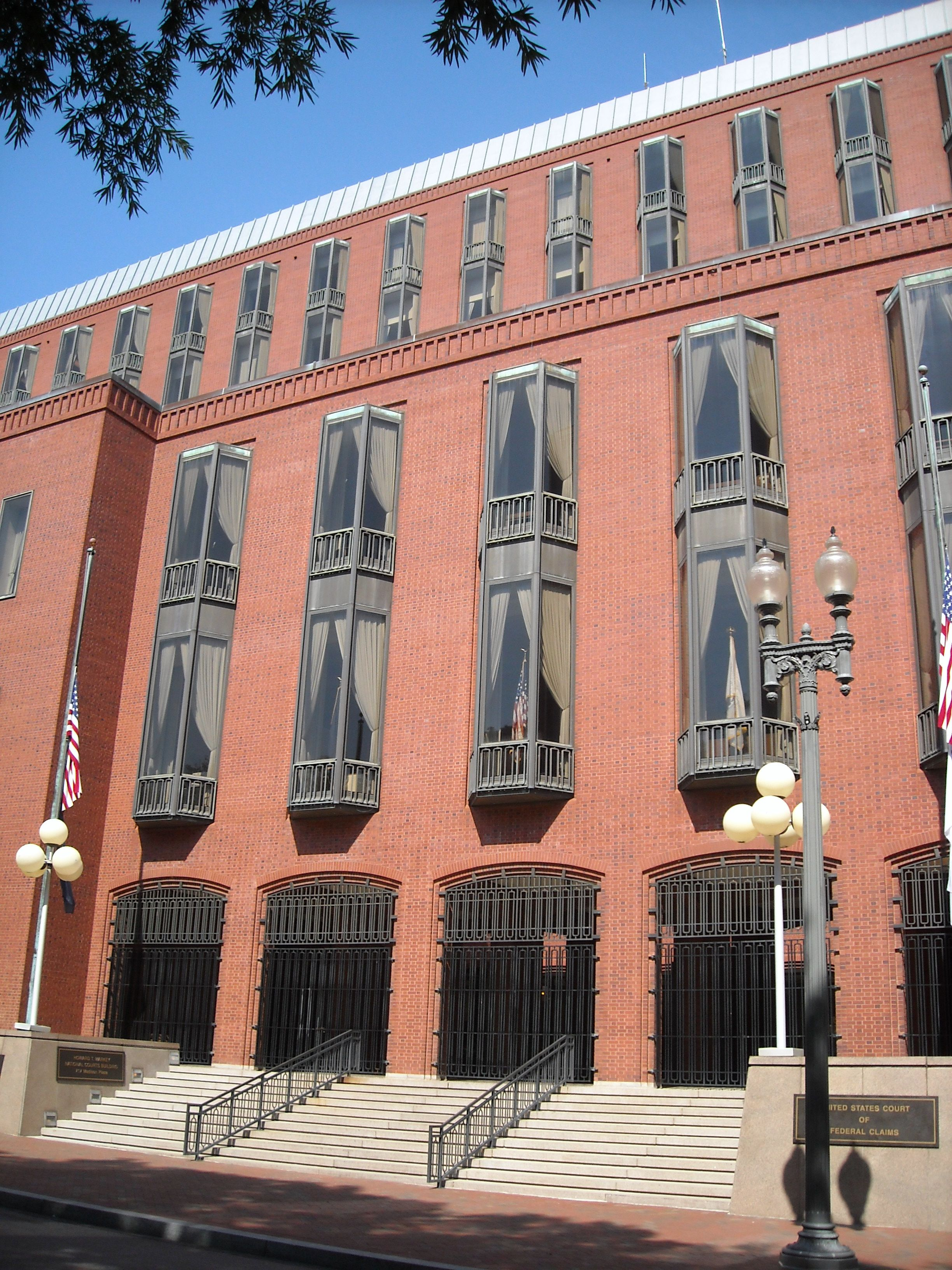
The Howard T. Markey National Courts Building was named in Markey's honor in 1997.

Markey was nominated by President Richard Nixon on May 3, 1972, to the designated Chief Judge seat on the United States Court of Customs and Patent Appeals vacated by Chief Judge Eugene Worley. He was confirmed by the United States Senate on June 21, 1972, and received his commission on June 22, 1972. He was reassigned by operation of law on October 1, 1982, to the United States Court of Appeals for the Federal Circuit, to a new seat authorized by 96 Stat. 25. He served as the court's first Chief Judge from 1982 to 1990. His service terminated on April 30, 1991, due to his retirement.

During his tenure on both courts, and while sitting by designation in the regional circuits, Markey is estimated to have participated in more than 6,400 cases, and to have written over 1,000 opinions. Following his retirement from the bench, Markey served as the dean of John Marshall Law School in Chicago, Illinois, from 1991 until 1994.

In 1997, the United States Congress renamed the Federal Circuit's Washington, D.C. headquarters the Howard T. Markey National Courts Building. Congressman Henry Hyde (R-IL), then-Chairman of the House Judiciary Committee, said that Markey's efforts had established the Federal Circuit as "the world's most respected and followed court on matters of intellectual property."

== Retirement and death ==
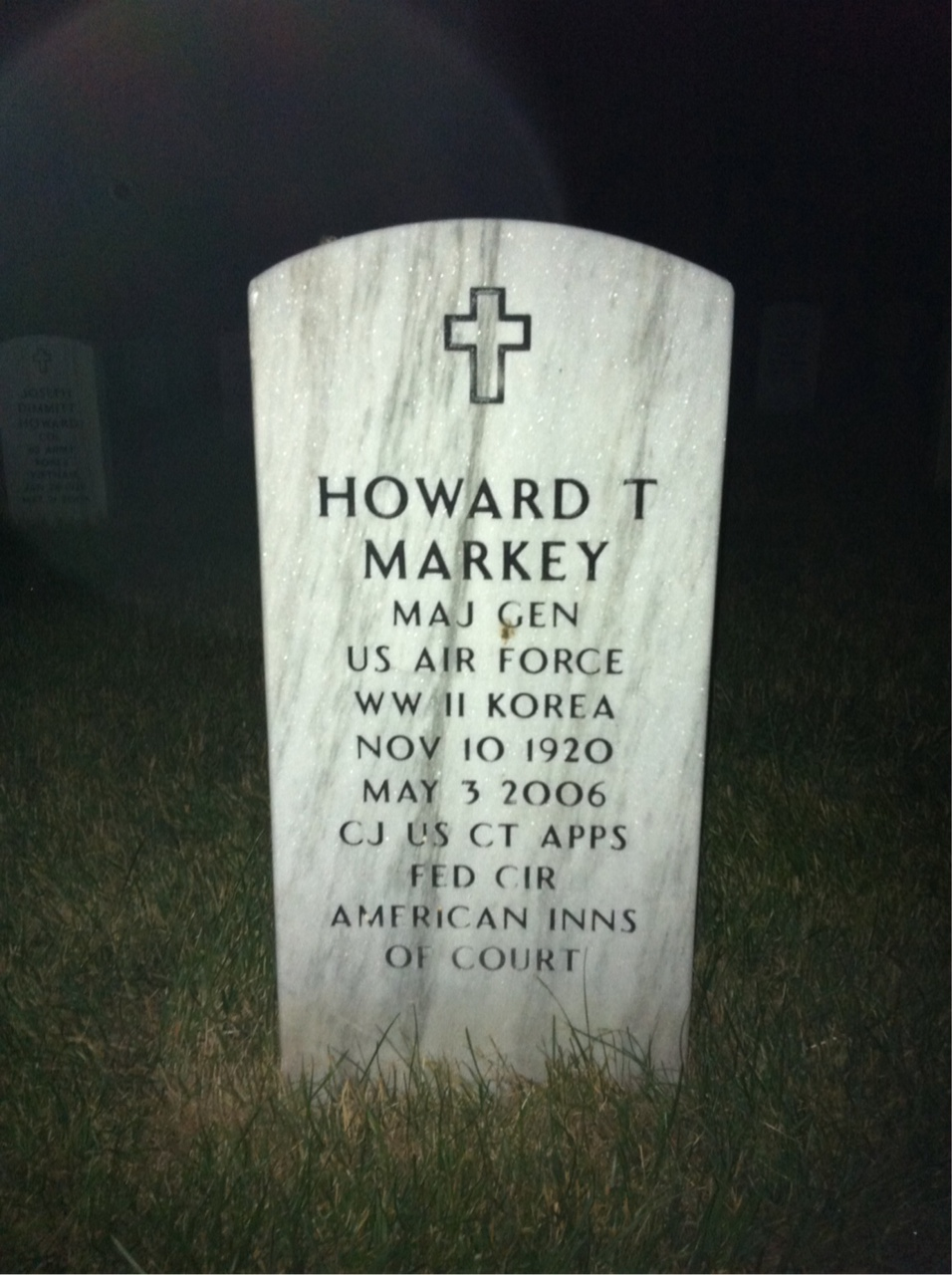
Grave at Arlington National Cemetery

Markey, who suffered from Parkinson's disease, died on May 3, 2006, in a nursing home in Hinsdale, Illinois where he lived his last years. Known for his sense of humor, he is said to have asked the nursing home staff to call him "judge" and "general" on alternate days. Markey was buried at Arlington National Cemetery. His wife of 52 years, Elizabeth Pelletier Markey, died in 1994. They had three sons.

== Sources ==
- Obituaries: Howard Markey; First Chief Judge of Federal Circuit Appellate Court, Patricia Sullivan. Washington Post, May 5, 2006.
- Former Federal Circuit Judge Howard T. Markey Dies, BNA Patent, Trademark & Copyright Journal, May 5, 2006.

Legal offices
Preceded by Eugene Worley	Chief Judge of the United States Court of Customs and Patent Appeals; 1972–1982	Seat abolished
Preceded by Seat established by 96 Stat. 25	Judge of the United States Court of Appeals for the Federal Circuit; 1982–1991	Succeeded by William Curtis Bryson
Preceded by Office established	Chief Judge of the United States Court of Appeals for the Federal Circuit; 1982–1990	Succeeded by Helen W. Nies
