= George Ewing Martin =

American judge (1857–1948)

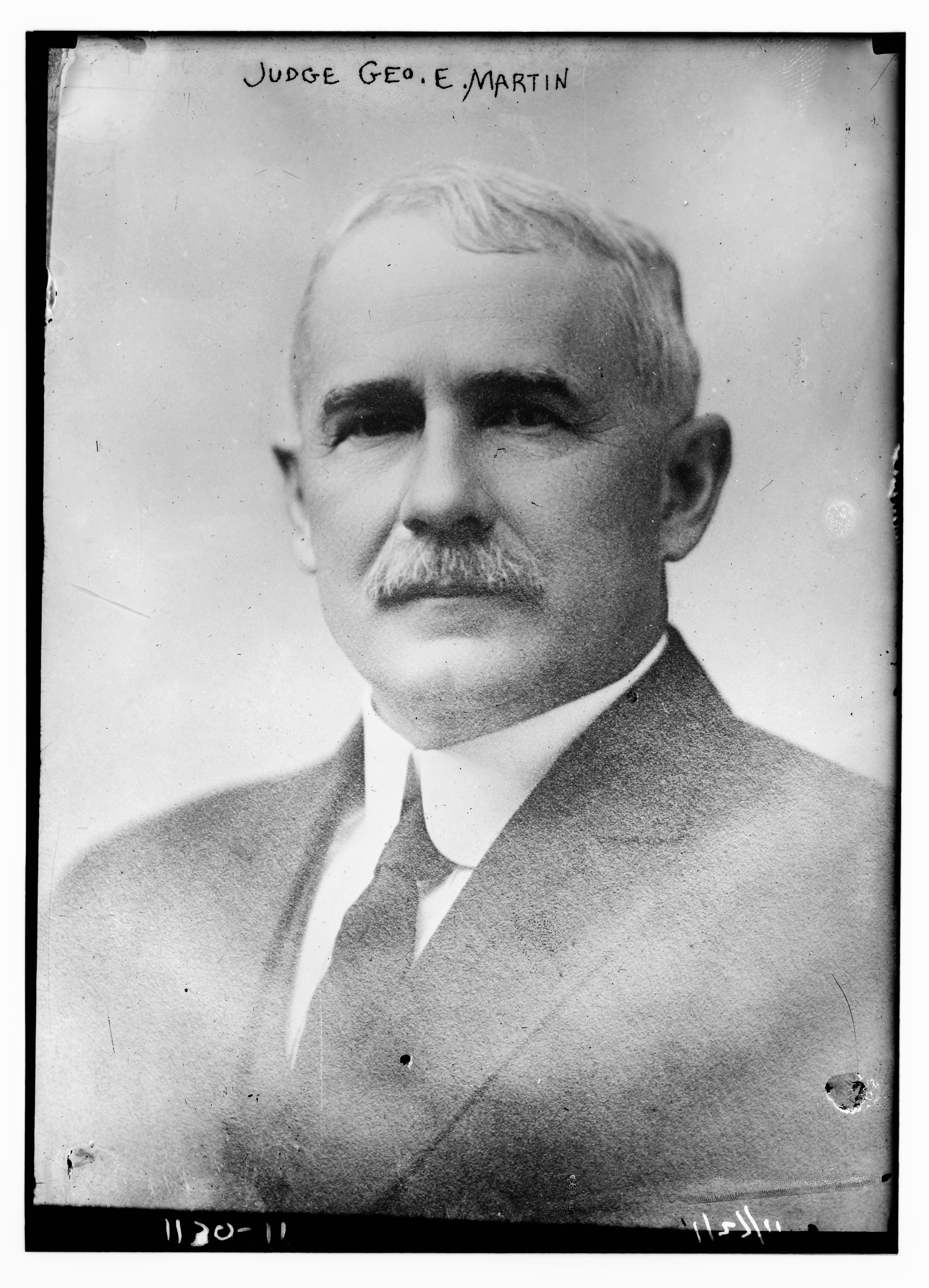

Senior Judge of the United States Court of Appeals for the District of Columbia
- In office September 30, 1937 – April 14, 1948

Chief Justice of the United States Court of Appeals for the District of Columbia
- In office May 22, 1924 – September 30, 1937
- Appointed by: Calvin Coolidge
- Preceded by: Constantine Joseph Smyth
- Succeeded by: Duncan Lawrence Groner

Presiding Judge of the United States Court of Customs Appeals
- In office January 4, 1923 – May 24, 1924
- Appointed by: Warren G. Harding
- Preceded by: Marion De Vries
- Succeeded by: William J. Graham

Associate Judge of the United States Court of Customs Appeals
- In office February 8, 1911 – January 4, 1923
- Appointed by: William Howard Taft
- Preceded by: William Henry Hunt
- Succeeded by: Charles Sherrod Hatfield

Personal details
- Born: George Ewing Martin; November 23, 1857 Lancaster, Ohio, U.S.
- Died: April 14, 1948 (aged 90) Washington, D.C., U.S.
- Education: University of Heidelberg; Wittenberg University (AB) read law

George Ewing Martin (November 23, 1857 – April 14, 1948) was the chief justice of the United States Court of Appeals for the District of Columbia and previously was an associate judge and later the presiding judge of the United States Court of Customs Appeals.

== Education and career ==
Born in Lancaster, Ohio, Martin attended the University of Heidelberg in the German Empire and received an Artium Baccalaureus degree from Wittenberg College (now Wittenberg University) in 1877. He read law to enter the bar in 1883, and was in private practice in Lancaster from 1883 to 1904. He was a Judge of the Ohio Court of Common Pleas for the 7th Judicial District from 1904 to 1911.

== Federal judicial service ==
Martin was nominated by President William Howard Taft on February 1, 1911, to an Associate Judge seat on the United States Court of Customs Appeals (later the United States Court of Customs and Patent Appeals) vacated by Associate Judge William Henry Hunt. He was confirmed by the United States Senate on February 8, 1911, and received his commission the same day. His service terminated on January 4, 1923, due to his elevation to Presiding Judge of the same court.

Martin was nominated by President Warren G. Harding on December 28, 1922, to the Presiding Judge seat on the United States Court of Customs Appeals (later the United States Court of Customs and Patent Appeals) vacated by Presiding Judge Marion De Vries. He was confirmed by the United States Senate on January 4, 1923, and received his commission the same day. His service terminated on May 24, 1924, due to appointment to the Court of Appeals of the District of Columbia.

Martin was nominated by President Calvin Coolidge on May 16, 1924, to the Chief Justice seat on the Court of Appeals of the District of Columbia (United States Court of Appeals for the District of Columbia from June 7, 1934, now the United States Court of Appeals for the District of Columbia Circuit) vacated by Chief Justice Constantine Joseph Smyth. He was confirmed by the United States Senate on May 22, 1924, and received his commission the same day. He assumed senior status on September 30, 1937. His service terminated on April 14, 1948, due to his death in Washington, D.C.

== Sources ==
Legal offices
Preceded by William Henry Hunt	Associate Judge of the United States Court of Customs Appeals; 1911–1923	Succeeded by Charles Sherrod Hatfield
Preceded by Marion De Vries	Presiding Judge of the United States Court of Customs Appeals; 1923–1924	Succeeded by William J. Graham
Preceded by Constantine Joseph Smyth	Chief Justice of the United States Court of Appeals for the District of Columbia; 1924–1937	Succeeded by Duncan Lawrence Groner
