= Eugene Worley =

American politician and judge

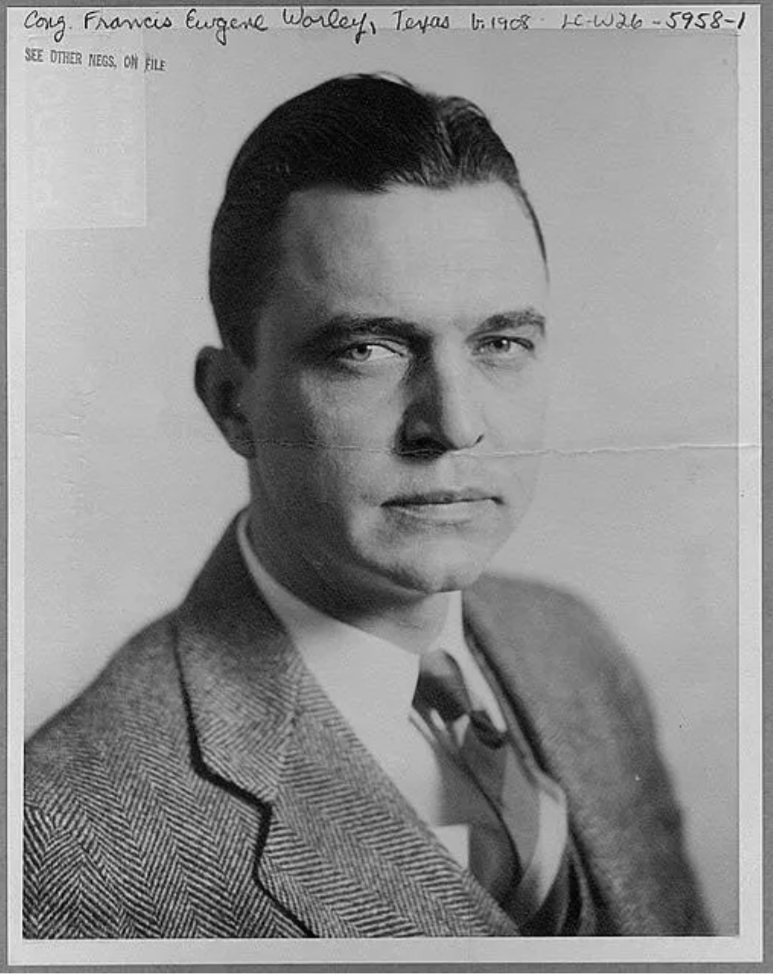
- Worley, c. 1940–1950

Senior Judge of the United States Court of Customs and Patent Appeals
- In office June 26, 1972 – December 17, 1974

Chief Judge of the United States Court of Customs and Patent Appeals
- In office April 30, 1959 – June 26, 1972
- Appointed by: Dwight D. Eisenhower
- Preceded by: Noble J. Johnson
- Succeeded by: Howard Thomas Markey

Associate Judge of the United States Court of Customs and Patent Appeals
- In office March 9, 1950 – April 30, 1959
- Appointed by: Harry S. Truman
- Preceded by: Charles Sherrod Hatfield
- Succeeded by: Arthur Mumford Smith

Member of the U.S. House of Representatives from Texas's 18th district
- In office January 3, 1941 – April 3, 1950
- Preceded by: John Marvin Jones
- Succeeded by: Ben H. Guill

Member of the Texas House of Representatives from the 122nd district
- In office January 8, 1935 – May 13, 1940

Personal details
- Born: Francis Eugene Worley; October 10, 1908 Lone Wolf, Oklahoma, U.S.
- Died: December 17, 1974 (aged 66) Naples, Florida, U.S.
- Resting place: Columbia Gardens Cemetery; Arlington, Virginia, U.S.
- Party: Democratic
- Education: Texas A&M University; University of Texas School of Law

Francis Eugene Worley (October 10, 1908 – December 17, 1974) was a United States representative from Texas and later an associate judge and chief judge of the United States Court of Customs and Patent Appeals.

== Education and career ==
Worley was born on October 10, 1908, in Lone Wolf, Oklahoma. He moved to Shamrock, Texas, in 1922, attending the public schools. He attended the Agricultural and Mechanical College of Texas (now Texas A&M University) in 1927 and 1928, and the University of Texas School of Law from 1930 to 1935. He was admitted to the bar in 1935 and entered private practice in Shamrock from 1935 to 1941. He was a member of the Texas House of Representatives from 1935 to 1940. He was a United States representative from Texas from 1941 to 1950. He was a lieutenant commander in the United States Naval Reserve during World War II from 1941 to 1942, while a Member of Congress.

== Congressional service ==
Worley won the Democratic primary nomination following a mass campaign including many high school students. He was elected to the 77th United States Congress and reelected to the four succeeding Congresses and served from January 3, 1941, until his resignation April 3, 1950. He served as Chairman of the Committee on Election of President, Vice President, and Representatives in the 78th United States Congress. In the 1948 general election, Worley handily defeated the Republican Party nominee, Texas historian and rancher J. Evetts Haley, who ran for governor as a Democrat in 1956 and then returned to the GOP to support Barry M. Goldwater in 1964.

Worley's most notable electoral opponent during his Congressional years was LaMarr Bailey, a World War II veteran who ran as an anti-New Dealer. Bailey campaigned around the district on a horse. Bailey lost the Democratic Primary to Worley in 1944.

== Federal judicial service ==
Worley was nominated by President Harry S. Truman on February 24, 1950, to an Associate Judge seat on the United States Court of Customs and Patent Appeals vacated by Judge Charles Sherrod Hatfield. He was confirmed by the United States Senate on March 8, 1950, and received his commission on March 9, 1950. Worley was initially appointed as a Judge under Article I, but the court was raised to Article III status by operation of law on August 25, 1958, and Worley thereafter served as an Article III Judge. His service terminated on April 30, 1959, due to his elevation to be Chief Judge of the same court.

Worley was nominated by President Dwight D. Eisenhower on March 25, 1959, to the Chief Judge seat on the United States Court of Customs and Patent Appeals vacated by Judge Noble J. Johnson. He was confirmed by the United States Senate on April 29, 1959, and received his commission on April 30, 1959. He was a member of the Judicial Conference of the United States from 1961 to 1972. He assumed senior status due to a certified disability on June 26, 1972. His service terminated on December 17, 1974, due to his death.

== Death ==
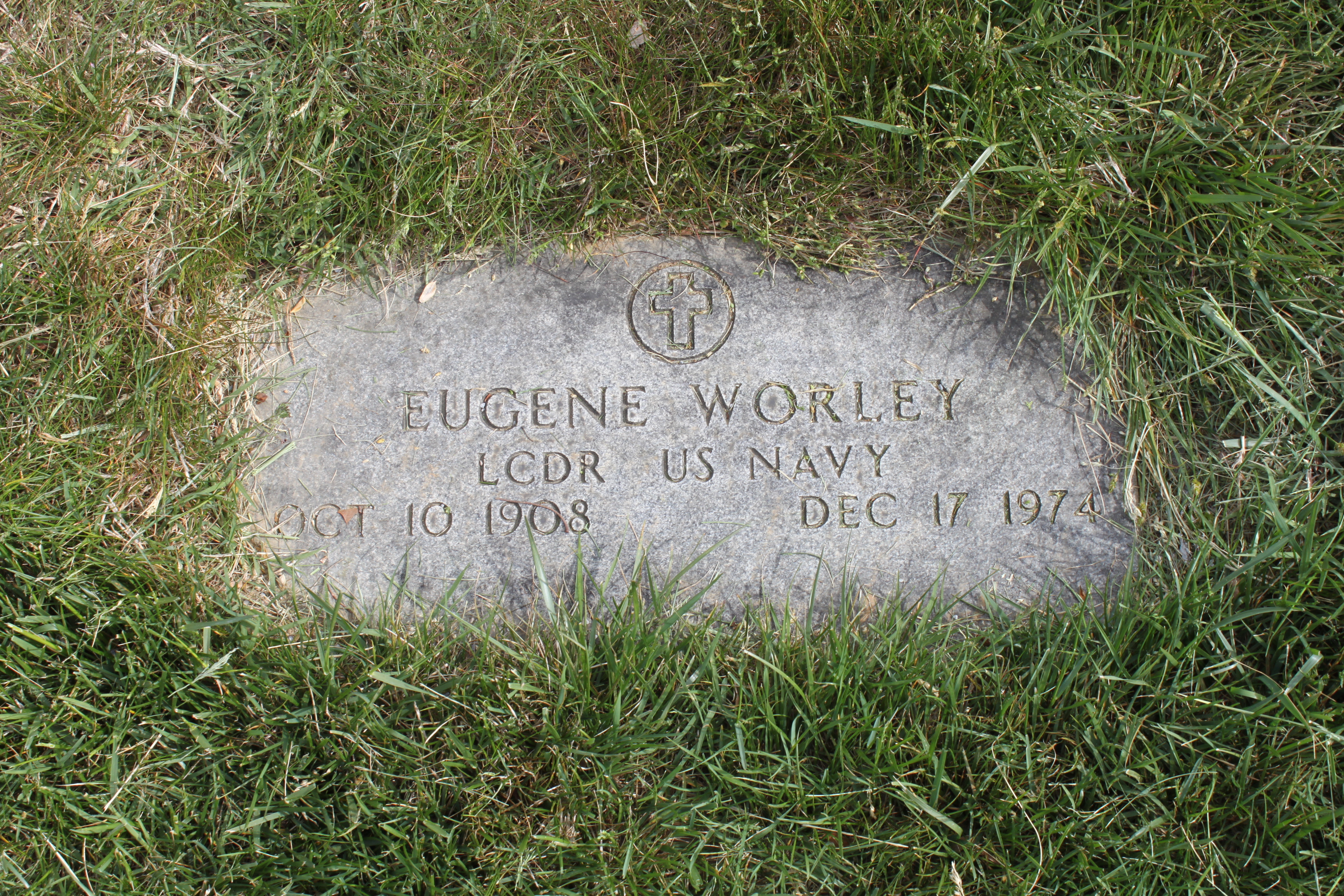
Grave of Worley at Columbia Gardens Cemetery

Worley resided in Arlington County, Virginia, during his court service. He died on December 17, 1974, in Naples, Florida. He was cremated and his ashes interred at Columbia Gardens Cemetery in Arlington County.

== Sources ==
- United States Congress. "Eugene Worley (id: W000744)". Biographical Directory of the United States Congress.
- "Worley, Francis Eugene - Federal Judicial Center". www.fjc.gov.

U.S. House of Representatives
Preceded by John Marvin Jones	Member of the United States House of Representatives from Texas's 18th congressional district 1941–1950	Succeeded by Ben H. Guill
Preceded by Caroline Love Goodwin O'Day	Chairman of the House Elections Committee; 1943–1945	Succeeded by Herbert Covington Bonner
Legal offices
Preceded by Charles Sherrod Hatfield	Associate Judge of the United States Court of Customs and Patent Appeals; 1950–1959	Succeeded by Arthur Mumford Smith
Preceded by Noble J. Johnson	Chief Judge of the United States Court of Customs and Patent Appeals; 1959–1972	Succeeded by Howard Thomas Markey
