= Donald Edward Lane =

American judge (1909–1979)

Donald Lane

Associate Judge of the United States Court of Customs and Patent Appeals
- In office June 20, 1969 – May 30, 1979
- Appointed by: Richard Nixon
- Preceded by: Arthur Mumford Smith
- Succeeded by: Helen W. Nies

Personal details
- Born: Donald Edward Lane; June 10, 1909 Chevy Chase, Maryland, U.S.
- Died: May 30, 1979 (aged 69) Washington, D.C., U.S.
- Education: Yale University (BS); George Washington University Law School (LLB)

Donald Edward Lane (June 10, 1909 – May 30, 1979) was an associate judge of the United States Court of Customs and Patent Appeals.

== Education and career ==
Born in Chevy Chase, Maryland, Lane earned a Bachelor of Science degree from Yale University in 1927, and then attended George Washington University Law School. He was in private practice in Washington, D.C. from 1935 to 1941, and from 1945 to 1954, the gap arising from his service as a United States Naval Reserve Commander in World War II. He became a commissioner of the United States Court of Claims in 1954, until his elevation in 1969.

== Federal judicial service ==
Lane was nominated by President Richard Nixon on May 14, 1969, to a seat on the United States Court of Customs and Patent Appeals vacated by Judge Arthur Mumford Smith. He was confirmed by the United States Senate on June 19, 1969, and received his commission on June 20, 1969. His service terminated on May 30, 1979, due to his death of an undisclosed illness.

Legal offices
Preceded by Arthur Mumford Smith	Associate Judge of the United States Court of Customs and Patent Appeals; 1969–1979	Succeeded by Helen W. Nies
