= United States Court of Customs and Patent Appeals =

Former United States federal court

The United States Court of Customs and Patent Appeals (CCPA) was a United States federal court which existed from 1909 to 1982 and had jurisdiction over certain types of civil disputes.

== History ==
The CCPA began as the United States Court of Customs Appeals, created by the Payne–Aldrich Tariff Act of August 5, 1909. It commenced operations the following year, on April 22, 1910. Five judges for the new court were appointed by President Taft: Robert Morris Montgomery, William H. Hunt, James Francis Smith, Orion M. Barber and Marion De Vries. The jurisdiction was originally appeals from decisions of the Board of General Appraisers, and no further appellate review was permitted. This changed in 1914, when writ of certiorari by the United States Supreme Court was allowed. The Patent Act of 1922 expanded the court's jurisdiction to include appeals on questions of law from Tariff Commission findings in proceedings relating to unfair practices in the import trade.

In 1929, the court's name was changed to the United States Court of Customs and Patent Appeals by an enactment that conferred upon it appeals from the United States Patent Office. These appeals included ex parte patent cases, appeals from interference proceedings, and trademark cases, appeals which theretofore had been heard in United States Court of Appeals for the District of Columbia Circuit. In the 1929 case Ex Parte Bakelite Corporation, the Supreme Court held that the CCPA was a court formed under Article I of the Constitution. This left the judges unable to sit by designation on regular federal courts, and in an ambiguous situation regarding judicial retirement. This situation was not addressed by Congress until August 25, 1958, when a law was passed deeming the CCPA an Article III court. This law was subsequently upheld by the Supreme Court, which overruled the Bakelite case.

In 1930, the CCPA moved into the Internal Revenue Service Building, where it remained until 1967. The CCPA moved into the National Courts Building (now the Howard T. Markey National Courts Building), which it shared with the United States Court of Claims.

In 1982, the CCPA was abolished by the Federal Courts Improvement Act. Its jurisdiction, docket, and judges were transferred to the United States Court of Appeals for the Federal Circuit.

== Judges ==
A total of 25 judges were appointed to the CCPA over the life of the court:

#	Judge	State	Born–died	Active service	Chief Judge	Senior status	Appointed by	Reason for termination
1	Robert Morris Montgomery	MI	1849–1910	1910–1920	1910–1920	—	Taft	death
2	Marion De Vries	CA	1865–1939	1910–1922	1921–1922	—	Taft	resignation
3	Orion M. Barber	VT	1857–1930	1910–1928	—	1928–1930	Taft	death
4	James Francis Smith	CA	1859–1928	1910–1928	—	—	Taft	death
5	William Henry Hunt	MT	1857–1949	1910–1911	—	—	Taft	retirement
6	George Ewing Martin	OH	1857–1948	1911–1924	1923–1924	—	Taft	elevation
7	Oscar E. Bland	IN	1877–1951	1923–1947	—	—	Harding	retirement
8	Charles Sherrod Hatfield	OH	1882–1950	1923–1950	—	—	Harding	death
9	William J. Graham	IL	1872–1937	1924–1937	1924–1937	—	Coolidge	death
10	Finis J. Garrett	TN	1875–1956	1929–1955	1937–1955	—	Coolidge	retirement
11	Irvine Lenroot	WI	1869–1949	1929–1944	—	—	Hoover	retirement
12	Joseph Raymond Jackson	NY	1880–1969	1937–1952	—	1952–1969	F. Roosevelt	death
13	Ambrose O'Connell	NY	1881–1962	1944–1962	—	1962	F. Roosevelt	death
14	Noble J. Johnson	IN	1887–1968	1948–1958	1956–1958	1958–1968	Truman	death
15	Eugene Worley	TX	1908–1974	1950–1972	1959–1972	1972–1974	Truman	death
16	William Purington Cole Jr.	MD	1889–1957	1952–1957	—	—	Truman	death
17	Giles Rich	NY	1904–1999	1956–1982	—	—	Eisenhower	reassignment
18	Isaac Jack Martin	MD	1908–1966	1958–1966	—	—	Eisenhower	death
19	Arthur Mumford Smith	MI	1903–1968	1959–1968	—	—	Eisenhower	death
20	J. Lindsay Almond	VA	1898–1986	1963–1973	—	1973–1982	Kennedy	reassignment
21	Phillip Baldwin	TX	1924–2002	1968–1982	—	—	L. Johnson	reassignment
22	Donald Edward Lane	DC	1909–1979	1969–1979	—	—	Nixon	death
23	Howard Thomas Markey	IL	1920–2006	1972–1982	1972–1982	—	Nixon	reassignment
24	Jack Miller	IA	1916–1994	1973–1982	—	—	Nixon	reassignment
25	Helen W. Nies	MD	1925–1996	1980–1982	—	—	Carter	reassignment

== Succession of seats ==
Seat 1 (Chief Judge)
Established as Presiding Judge of the United States Court of Customs Appeals on March 30, 1910, by 36 Stat. 11
Montgomery	MI	1910–1920
De Vries	CA	1921–1922
G. Martin	OH	1923–1924
Graham	IL	1924–1929
Redesignated as Presiding Judge of the United States Court of Customs and Patent Appeals on March 2, 1929, by 45 Stat. 1475
Graham	IL	1929–1937
Garrett	TN	1937–1948
Redesignated as Chief Judge of the United States Court of Customs and Patent Appeals on June 25, 1948, by 62 Stat. 899
Garrett	TN	1948–1955
Johnson	IN	1956–1958
Worley	TX	1959–1972
Markey	IL	1972–1982
Reassigned to United States Court of Appeals for the Federal Circuit on October 1, 1982, by 96 Stat. 25

Seat 2
Established as Associate Judge of the United States Court of Customs Appeals on March 30, 1910, by 36 Stat. 11
De Vries	CA	1910–1921
Bland	IN	1923–1929
Redesignated as Associate Judge of the United States Court of Customs and Patent Appeals on March 2, 1929, by 45 Stat. 1475
Bland	IN	1929–1947
Johnson	IN	1948–1956
Rich	NY	1956–1982
Reassigned to United States Court of Appeals for the Federal Circuit on October 1, 1982, by 96 Stat. 25

Seat 3
Established as Associate Judge of the United States Court of Customs Appeals on March 30, 1910, by 36 Stat. 11
Barber	VT	1910–1928
Redesignated as Associate Judge of the United States Court of Customs and Patent Appeals on March 2, 1929, by 45 Stat. 1475
Lenroot	WI	1929–1944
O'Connell	NY	1944–1962
Almond	VA	1963–1973
Miller	IA	1973–1982
Reassigned to United States Court of Appeals for the Federal Circuit on October 1, 1982, by 96 Stat. 25

Seat 4
Established as Associate Judge of the United States Court of Customs Appeals on March 30, 1910, by 36 Stat. 11
J. Smith	CA	1910–1928
Garrett	TN	1929
Redesignated as Associate Judge of the United States Court of Customs and Patent Appeals on March 2, 1929, by 45 Stat. 1475
Garrett	TN	1929–1937
Jackson	NY	1937–1952
Cole Jr.	MD	1952–1957
I. Martin	MD	1958–1966
Baldwin	TX	1968–1982
Reassigned to United States Court of Appeals for the Federal Circuit on October 1, 1982, by 96 Stat. 25

Seat 5
Established as Associate Judge of the United States Court of Customs Appeals on March 30, 1910, by 36 Stat. 11
Hunt	MT	1910–1911
G. Martin	OH	1911–1923
Hatfield	OH	1923–1929
Redesignated as Associate Judge of the United States Court of Customs and Patent Appeals on March 2, 1929, by 45 Stat. 1475
Hatfield	OH	1929–1950
Worley	TX	1950–1959
A. Smith	MI	1959–1968
Lane	DC	1969–1979
Nies	MD	1980–1982
Reassigned to United States Court of Appeals for the Federal Circuit on October 1, 1982, by 96 Stat. 25

== See also ==
- United States Court of International Trade
- United States Court of Appeals for the Federal Circuit

== Bibliography ==
A brief history of the United States Court of Customs and Patent Appeals / by Giles S. Rich. Washington, D.C. : Published by authorization of Committee on the Bicentennial of Independence and the Constitution of the Judicial Conference of the United States : U.S. G.P.O., 1980.
