= Charles Sherrod Hatfield =

American judge (1882–1950)

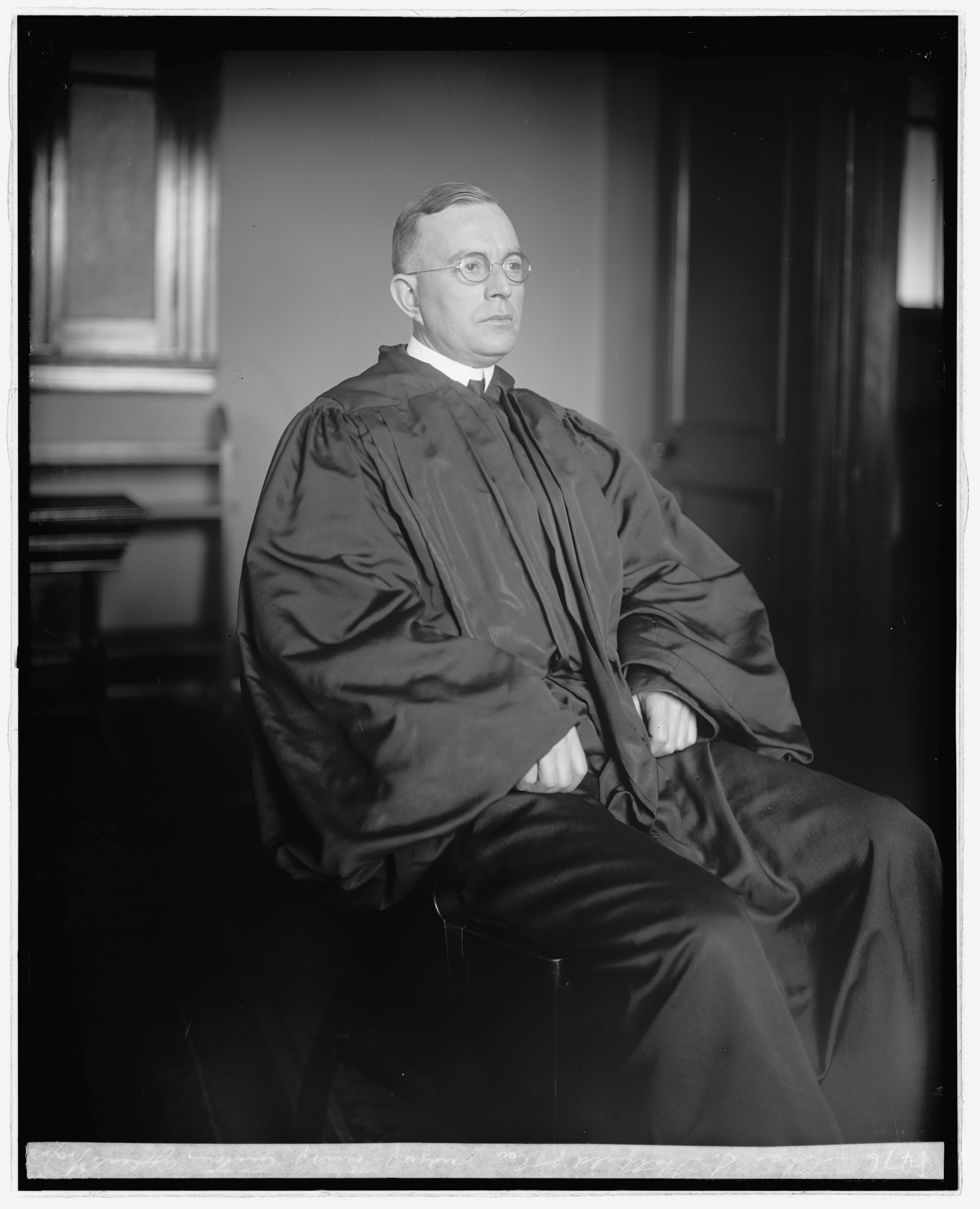

Associate Judge of the United States Court of Customs and Patent Appeals
- In office March 3, 1923 – February 9, 1950
- Appointed by: Warren G. Harding
- Preceded by: George Ewing Martin
- Succeeded by: Eugene Worley

Personal details
- Born: Charles Sherrod Hatfield; June 29, 1882 West Millgrove, Ohio
- Died: February 9, 1950 (aged 67) Washington, D.C.
- Education: Hanover College (A.B.); Ohio State University Moritz College of Law (LL.B.)

Charles Sherrod Hatfield (June 29, 1882 – February 9, 1950) was an associate judge of the United States Court of Customs and Patent Appeals.

== Education and career ==
Born on June 29, 1882, in West Millgrove, Ohio, Hatfield received an Artium Baccalaureus degree from Hanover College, and a Bachelor of Laws from the Ohio State University Moritz College of Law. He was a prosecuting attorney for Wood County, Ohio beginning in 1907. He later entered private practice until 1923. He was also a lecturer for the National University Law School (now Georgetown Law).

== Federal judicial service ==
Hatfield was nominated by President Warren G. Harding on March 2, 1923, to an Associate Judge seat on the United States Court of Customs Appeals (United States Court of Customs and Patent Appeals from March 2, 1929) vacated by Associate Judge George Ewing Martin. He was confirmed by the United States Senate on March 3, 1923, and received his commission the same day. His service terminated on February 9, 1950, due to his death in Washington, D.C.

== Sources ==
Legal offices
Preceded by George Ewing Martin	Associate Judge of the United States Court of Customs and Patent Appeals; 1923–1950	Succeeded by Eugene Worley
