= Ben H. Guill =

American politician (1909–1994)

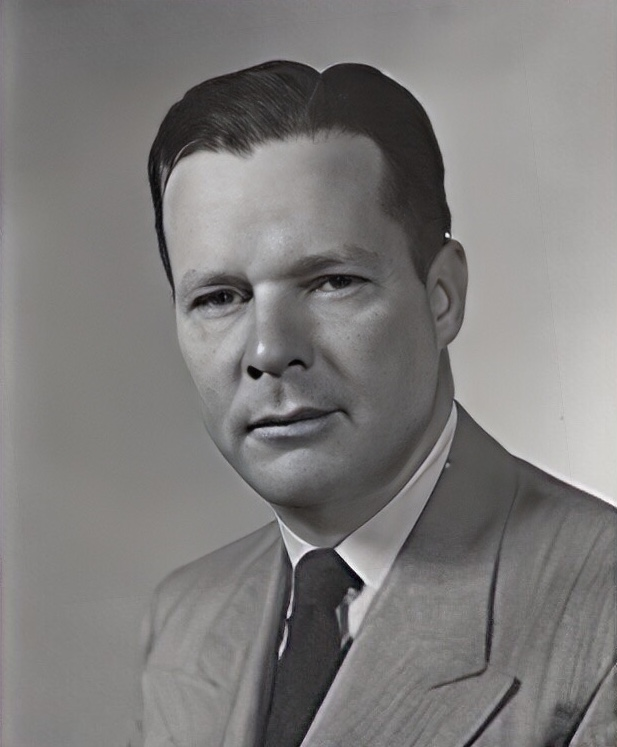

Member of the U.S. House of Representatives from Texas's 18th district
- In office May 6, 1950 – January 3, 1951
- Preceded by: Eugene Worley
- Succeeded by: Walter E. Rogers

Personal details
- Born: Ben Hugh Guill; September 8, 1909 Smyrna, Tennessee, U.S.
- Died: January 15, 1994 (aged 84) Pampa, Texas, U.S.
- Resting place: Fairview Cemetery in Pampa, Texas
- Party: Republican
- Spouse: Marjorie Buckler
- Children: 1
- Education: West Texas A&M University
- Occupation: Educator; Businessman

Military service
- Allegiance: United States
- Branch/service: United States Navy
- Years of service: 1942–1945
- Battles/wars: World War II

Ben Hugh Guill (September 8, 1909 – January 15, 1994) was a short-term Republican member of the United States House of Representatives from Texas's 18th congressional district, which then encompassed the Panhandle counties. He won a 1950 special election and served the remaining eight months in office before the term expired.

== Early life and education ==
Guill was born on September 9, 1909, in Smyrna, Tennessee, the son of Hugh Hays Guill and Cora Anna (Jones) Guill. His family moved to El Paso, Texas, in 1918. He attended Canyon High School. He graduated in 1933 from West Texas A&M University in Canyon, Texas, then known as West Texas State College.

== Career ==
Guill worked as an educator before becoming a business executive, and a real estate agent.

=== World War II ===
From 1942 to 1945 during World War II, he served in the United States Navy.

=== Congress ===
Guill won a special election to the Eighty-first Congress to fill the vacancy created by the resignation of Representative Eugene Worley. Guill served the remaining term from May 6, 1950, to January 3, 1951. In the November 1950 general election, he was unsuccessful in his bid for reelection to a full term in the Eighty-second Congress, losing to the Democratic candidate.

The next Republican to hold the Panhandle U.S. House seat was Bob Price, also from Pampa. He was elected to four terms beginning in 1966.

=== Later career ===
Guill was a delegate to the 1952 Republican National Convention, which met in Chicago to nominate the Eisenhower-Nixon ticket.

From 1953 to 1955, Guill served as the executive assistant in Washington, D.C., to Arthur Summerfield, the United States Postmaster General. From 1955 to 1959, he was a member of the United States Federal Maritime Board in the United States Department of Commerce.

=== Death and burial ===
Guill died on January 15, 1994, in Pampa, Texas, and is interred there at Fairview Cemetery.

== Sources ==
- United States Congress. "Ben H. Guill (id: G000521)". Biographical Directory of the United States Congress.

U.S. House of Representatives
Preceded by Eugene Worley	Member of the U.S. House of Representatives from Texas's 18th congressional district 1950–1951	Succeeded by Walter E. Rogers
