= Francis M. Carpenter =

American politician (1834–1919)

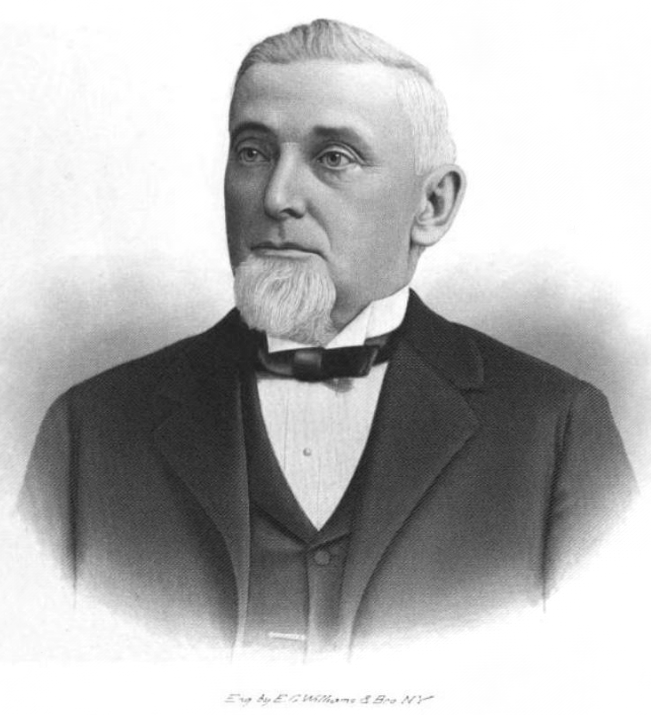
- Carpenter in an 1898 publication

Member of the New York Senate from the 23rd district
- In office 1907–1908
- Preceded by: Louis F. Goodsell
- Succeeded by: Howard R. Bayne

Member of the New York Senate from the 22nd district
- In office 1904–1906
- Preceded by: Charles P. McClelland
- Succeeded by: John P. Cohalan

Personal details
- Born: Francis Marshall Carpenter; July 10, 1834 New Castle, New York, U.S.
- Died: May 12, 1919 (aged 84) Mount Kisco, New York, U.S.
- Party: Republican
- Spouse(s): Mary B. Miller (m. 1859; died 1885) Catherine A. Moger (m. 1885)
- Children: 2
- Occupation: Politician; businessman; farmer
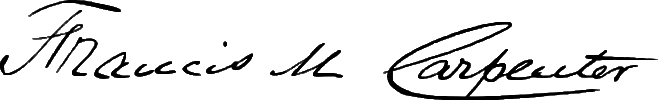
- Signature

Francis Marshall Carpenter (July 10, 1834 – May 12, 1919) was an American politician and businessman from New York. He served in the New York Senate from 1904 to 1906 and from 1907 to 1908.

== Early life ==
Francis Marshall Carpenter was born on July 10, 1834, in New Castle, Westchester County, New York, to Phebe (née Marshall) and Zopher Carpenter. He attended the common schools and Bedford Union Academy.

== Career ==
Carpenter worked as a clerk in a general store in Mount Kisco, New York. He then organized the firm Carpenter Young & Co., and dissolved it in 1862. In 1862, he purchased the farm he grew up. He farmed the land until 1873, when he sold it. From 1874 to 1894, he partnered with James H. Pettengill under the name Carpenter & Pettengill to engage in coal business in New York City.

Carpenter was a Republican. In 1862, he was elected supervisor of the town of New Castle and served continuously, except for the 1869–1870 term, until 1897. He also served as chairman of the board for several years. He was elected as county treasurer in 1896 and was re-elected in 1899. In 1903, following the resignation of Charles P. McClelland, he ran against and defeated William T. Emmet to represent the 22nd district in the New York Senate. He was re-elected in 1904 and 1906. He sat in the 127th, 128th, 129th (all three 22nd district), 130th and 131st New York State Legislatures (both 23rd district). On February 10, 1909, he was elected as regent of the University of the State of New York and served for 12 years.

Carpenter was president of the Westchester and Bronx Title Guaranty Company and vice president of the Westchester Trust Company and Mt. Kisco National Bank. He was director of the First National Bank of White Plains.

== Personal life ==
Carpenter married Mary B. Miller, daughter of John Miller, of Bedford in November 1859. They had two children, Zopher and Carrie. She died in 1885. In March 1885, he married Catherine A. Moger.

Carpenter died on May 12, 1919, at his home in Mount Kisco.

New York State Senate
Preceded by Charles P. McClelland	New York State Senate; 22nd District; 1904–1906	Succeeded by John P. Cohalan
Preceded by Louis F. Goodsell	New York State Senate; 23rd District; 1907–1908	Succeeded by Howard R. Bayne
