= Howard Bayne =

Howard Bayne is the name of:

- Howard R. Bayne (1851–1933), American politician, lawyer and historian
- Howard Bayne (basketball) (1942–2018), American basketball player
