= Isaac N. Mills =

American politician (1851–1929)

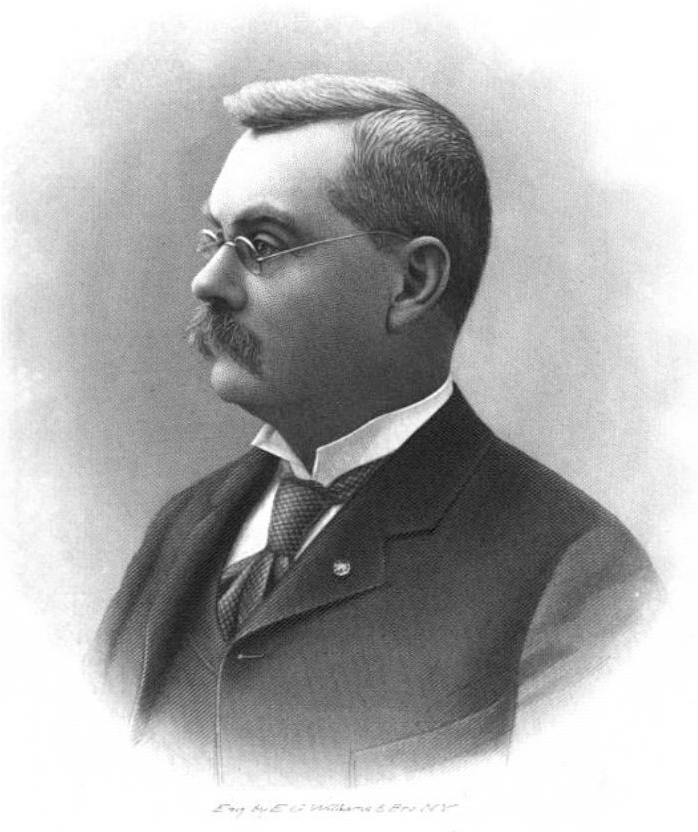

Justice of the New York Supreme Court
- In office 1906–1921

Member of the New York State Senate
- In office 1900–1902
- Constituency: 22nd District

Personal details
- Born: Isaac Newton Mills; September 10, 1851 Thompson, Connecticut, US
- Died: July 14, 1929 (aged 77) Mount Vernon, New York, US
- Resting place: St. Paul's Cemetery
- Party: Republican
- Spouse: Cara Maria Burnett (m. 1876)
- Children: 4
- Education: Amherst College; Columbia Law School
- Occupation: Lawyer, judge, politician

Isaac Newton Mills (September 10, 1851 – July 14, 1929) was an American lawyer, judge, and politician from New York.

== Life ==
Mills was born on September 10, 1851, in Thompson, Connecticut, the son of Isaac Mills and Susan Arnold.

Mills began studying at the Providence Conference Seminary in Greenwich, Rhode Island. In the winter of 1869 to 1870, he taught at a district school near Newport while studying for his classes. He graduated from the Seminary in the summer of 1870 in the top of his class. He entered Amherst College later that year. He won several prizes from Amherst in the next four years, and in 1874 he was the valedictorian for his graduating class. He then went to Columbia Law School, graduating from there in 1876. Later that year, he moved to Mount Vernon and began practicing law there. He formed a law firm with Joseph S. Wood called Mills & Wood, which ended in 1882. He later was in a law firm called Mills & Johnson, and had law offices in Mount Vernon and New York City. He was elected County Judge in 1883, an office he was re-elected to in 1889 and served in until 1895.

In 1900, Mills was elected to the New York State Senate as a Republican, representing New York's 22nd State Senate district. He served in the Senate in 1901 and 1902. In 1906, he was elected to the New York Supreme Court, 9th Judicial District. He was re-elected to the Court in 1920. In 1917, Governor Whitman appointed him to the Appellate Division, Second Department. He retired as Justice in 1921, although he continued to serve as a Referee for the Supreme Court. He resumed his law practice for the rest of his life. He was a delegate to the 1924 Republican National Convention.

In his 27 years on the bench, Mills never sentenced anyone to death. As Justice, he presided over Harry K. Thaw's trial. As a lawyer, he won the acquittal of Walter S. Ward for the murder of Clarence M. Peters and represented Mrs. Anne U. Stillman in her divorce proceedings against James A. Stillman, and Leonard Kip Rhinelander in his divorce case.

Mills was a member of the New York State Bar Association, the New York City Bar Association, the Westchester County Bar Association, the Union League Club, the New England Society, the Sons of the Revolution, Delta Kappa Epsilon, and the Freemasons. He was a member and trustee of the Westchester County Historical Society. He was also a member of the Royal Arch Masonry, the Knights Templar, and the New-York Historical Society. He attended the Congregational Church. In 1876, he married Cara Maria Burnett of Webster, Massachusetts. Their children were Nona Burnett, LeRoy Newton, Priscilla Alden, and Dr. Nathaniel.

Mills died at home on July 14, 1929. He was buried in St. Paul's Cemetery in Mount Vernon.

New York State Senate
Preceded by William J. Graney	New York State Senate; 22nd District; 1901–1902	Succeeded by Charles P. McClelland
