= William Emmet =

William Emmet may refer to:

- William Le Roy Emmet (1859–1941), American electrical engineer
- William T. Emmet (1869–1918), American lawyer from New York
