= Wilbur Fisk Lunt =

American judge

Member of the Board of General Appraisers
- In office January 28, 1891 – May 28, 1908
- Appointed by: Benjamin Harrison
- Preceded by: Joseph Lewis Stackpole
- Succeeded by: Roy Chamberlain

Personal details
- Born: Wilbur Fisk Lunt; 1848 Maine
- Died: May 28, 1908 (aged 59–60) New York City, New York

Wilbur Fisk Lunt (1848 – May 28, 1908) was a Member of the Board of General Appraisers.

== Education and career ==
Lunt was born in 1848 in Maine. He served in the First Maine Cavalry of the United States Army from 1863 to 1865. He served as an Assistant United States Attorney for the District of Maine from 1881 to 1885.

== Federal judicial service ==
Lunt was nominated by President Benjamin Harrison on January 21, 1891, to a seat on the Board of General Appraisers vacated by Joseph Lewis Stackpole. He was confirmed by the United States Senate on January 27, 1891, and received his commission on January 28, 1891. His service terminated on May 28, 1908, due to his death in New York City, New York. He was succeeded by Roy Chamberlain.

== Sources ==
- "Board of General Appraisers: Lunt, Wilbur Fisk - Federal Judicial Center". www.fjc.gov.

Legal offices
Preceded by Joseph Lewis Stackpole	Member of the Board of General Appraisers; 1891–1908	Succeeded by Roy Chamberlain
