= Joseph Buffington =

American judge (1855–1947)

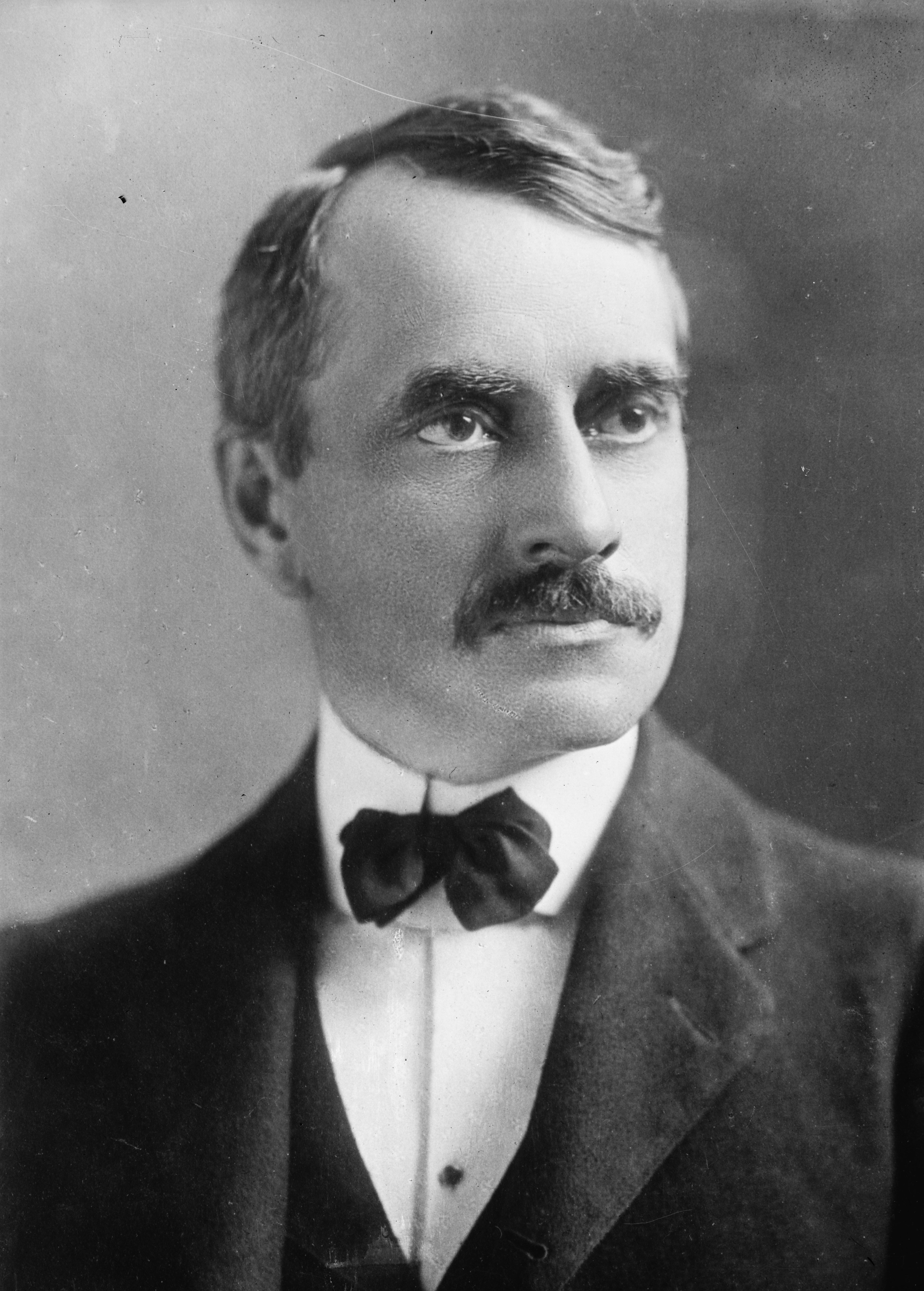
- Joseph Buffington (1901)

Senior Judge of the United States Court of Appeals for the Third Circuit
- In office June 1, 1938 – October 21, 1947

Judge of the United States Court of Appeals for the Third Circuit
- In office September 25, 1906 – June 1, 1938
- Appointed by: Theodore Roosevelt
- Preceded by: Marcus W. Acheson
- Succeeded by: Francis Biddle

Judge of the United States Circuit Courts for the Third Circuit
- In office September 25, 1906 – December 31, 1911
- Appointed by: Theodore Roosevelt
- Preceded by: Marcus W. Acheson
- Succeeded by: Seat abolished

Judge of the United States District Court for the Western District of Pennsylvania
- In office February 23, 1892 – September 26, 1906
- Appointed by: Benjamin Harrison
- Preceded by: James Hay Reed
- Succeeded by: Nathaniel Ewing

Personal details
- Born: Joseph Buffington; September 5, 1855 Kittanning, Pennsylvania
- Died: October 21, 1947 (aged 92) Pittsburgh, Pennsylvania
- Education: Trinity College (AB) read law

Joseph Buffington (September 5, 1855 – October 21, 1947) was a United States circuit judge of the United States Court of Appeals for the Third Circuit and of the United States Circuit Courts for the Third Circuit and previously was a United States district judge of the United States District Court for the Western District of Pennsylvania.

== Education and career ==
Born on September 5, 1855, in Kittanning, Pennsylvania, Buffington received an Artium Baccalaureus degree in 1875 from Trinity College in Hartford, Connecticut and read law in 1878. He entered private practice in Kittanning from 1878 to 1892.

== Federal judicial service ==
Buffington was nominated by President Benjamin Harrison on February 10, 1892, to a seat on the United States District Court for the Western District of Pennsylvania vacated by Judge James Hay Reed. He was confirmed by the United States Senate on February 23, 1892, and received his commission the same day. His service terminated on September 26, 1906, due to his elevation to the Third Circuit.

Buffington received a recess appointment from President Theodore Roosevelt on September 25, 1906, to a joint seat on the United States Court of Appeals for the Third Circuit and the United States Circuit Courts for the Third Circuit vacated by Judge Marcus W. Acheson. He was nominated to the same position by President Roosevelt on December 3, 1906. He was confirmed by the Senate on December 11, 1906, and received his commission the same day. On December 31, 1911, the Circuit Courts were abolished and he thereafter served only on the Court of Appeals. He was a member of the Conference of Senior Circuit Judges (now the Judicial Conference of the United States) from 1922 to 1937. He was the last appeals court judge who continued to serve in active service appointed by President Roosevelt. He assumed senior status on June 1, 1938. His service terminated on October 21, 1947, due to his death in Pittsburgh, Pennsylvania.

=== Scandal ===
During the 1930s, Buffington became involved in a scandal involving his colleague on the Court of Appeals, Judge John Warren Davis. Buffington was found to have been signing opinions drafted by Davis, in cases in which Davis received bribes. Davis was forced out of office, but no formal action was taken against Buffington, who was described as being "aged, senile, and nearly blind" by that time. He took what is now called senior status, a form of semi-retirement, on June 1, 1938, and ceased hearing cases.

== Family ==
Buffington was the son of Ephraim and Margaret Chambers (Orr) Buffington, and nephew to a well-known Pennsylvania judge of the same name. On January 29, 1885, he married Mary Alice Simonton, of Emmitsburg, Maryland.

== See also ==
- List of United States federal judges by longevity of service

== Sources ==
- Van Tassel, Emily Field, et al., Why Judges Resign: Influences on Federal Judicial Service, 1789 to 1992 (Federal Judicial Center 1993), p. 23.
- The Political Graveyard

Legal offices
Preceded by James Hay Reed	Judge of the United States District Court for the Western District of Pennsylvania; 1892–1906	Succeeded by Nathaniel Ewing
Preceded by Marcus W. Acheson	Judge of the United States Circuit Courts for the Third Circuit; 1906–1911	Succeeded by Seat abolished
Preceded by Marcus W. Acheson	Judge of the United States Court of Appeals for the Third Circuit; 1906–1938	Succeeded by Francis Biddle
