= Joseph Raymond Jackson =

American judge (1880–1969)

Senior Judge of the United States Court of Customs and Patent Appeals
- In office April 1, 1952 – August 29, 1969

Associate Judge of the United States Court of Customs and Patent Appeals
- In office December 14, 1937 – April 1, 1952
- Appointed by: Franklin D. Roosevelt
- Preceded by: Finis J. Garrett
- Succeeded by: William Purington Cole Jr.

Personal details
- Born: Joseph Raymond Jackson; August 30, 1880 Albany, New York, U.S.
- Died: August 29, 1969 (aged 88) Washington, D.C., U.S.
- Education: Manhattan College (A.B.) read law

Joseph Raymond Jackson (August 30, 1880 – August 29, 1969) was an associate judge of the United States Court of Customs and Patent Appeals.

== Education and career ==
Born on August 30, 1880, in Albany, New York, Jackson received an Artium Baccalaureus degree in 1900 from Manhattan College and read law in 1907. He was Principal of the Industrial School in Butte, Montana from 1903 to 1910. He was county attorney for Silver Bow County, Montana from 1917 to 1920. He was a judge of the Montana District Court for the Second Judicial District from 1920 to 1925. He was a Commissioner for the Montana Supreme Court from 1921 to 1922. He was in private practice in New York City from 1926 to 1934. He was assistant attorney general for the Customs Division of the United States Department of Justice in New York City from 1934 to 1937.

== Federal judicial service ==
Jackson was nominated by President Franklin D. Roosevelt on November 29, 1937, to an Associate Judge seat on the United States Court of Customs and Patent Appeals vacated by Associate Judge Finis J. Garrett. He was confirmed by the United States Senate on December 9, 1937, and received his commission on December 14, 1937. He assumed senior status on April 1, 1952. Jackson was initially appointed as a Judge under Article I, but the court was raised to Article III status by operation of law on August 25, 1958, and Jackson thereafter served as an Article III Judge. His service terminated on August 29, 1969, due to his death in Washington, D.C.

== Sources ==
- "Jackson, Joseph Raymond - Federal Judicial Center". www.fjc.gov.

Legal offices
Preceded by Finis J. Garrett	Associate Judge of the United States Court of Customs and Patent Appeals; 1937–1952	Succeeded by William Purington Cole Jr.
