= Samuel Murray Rosenstein =

American judge

Senior Judge of the United States Court of International Trade
- In office November 1, 1980 – December 11, 1995

Senior Judge of the United States Customs Court
- In office December 31, 1970 – November 1, 1980

Judge of the United States Customs Court
- In office July 25, 1968 – December 31, 1970
- Appointed by: Lyndon B. Johnson
- Preceded by: Webster Oliver
- Succeeded by: Nils Boe

Personal details
- Born: Samuel Murray Rosenstein; June 7, 1909 Frankfort, Kentucky, U.S.
- Died: December 11, 1995 (aged 86) Lexington, Kentucky, U.S.
- Education: University of Kentucky (AB); University of Cincinnati College of Law (LLB)

Samuel Murray Rosenstein (June 7, 1909 – December 11, 1995) was a judge of the United States Customs Court.

== Education and career ==
Born on June 7, 1909, in Frankfort, Kentucky, Rosenstein received an Artium Baccalaureus degree in 1928 from the University of Kentucky and a Bachelor of Laws in 1931 from the University of Cincinnati College of Law. He entered private practice in Frankfort from 1931 to 1946. He was the City Prosecutor of Frankfort from 1933 to 1941. He was Special Counsel for the Commonwealth of Kentucky from 1935 to 1943. He was the Acting County Attorney of Franklin County, Kentucky from 1941 to 1942. He returned to private practice in Louisville, Kentucky from 1946 to 1968.

== Federal judicial service ==
Rosenstein was nominated by President Lyndon B. Johnson on July 17, 1968, to a seat on the United States Customs Court vacated by Judge Webster Oliver. He was confirmed by the United States Senate on July 25, 1968, and received his commission on July 25, 1968. He assumed senior status due to a certified disability on December 31, 1970. He was reassigned by operation of law to the United States Court of International Trade on November 1, 1980, by 94 Stat. 1727. His service terminated on December 11, 1995, due to his death in Lexington, Kentucky.

== Sources ==
Legal offices
Preceded by Webster Oliver	Judge of the United States Customs Court; 1968–1970	Succeeded by Nils Boe
