= William J. Graney =

American politician

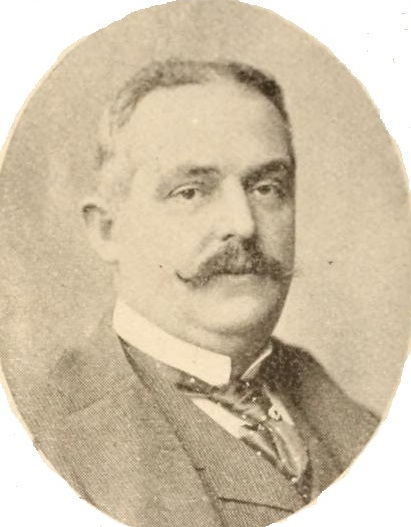
William J. Graney (1900)

William J. Graney (May 5, 1858 – May 26, 1913) was an American politician from New York.

== Life ==
He was born on May 5, 1858, in Dobbs Ferry, Westchester County, New York. He attended the public schools, and graduated from Dobbs Ferry High School. Then he became a bookkeeper. Later he managed the Hatch Lithographing Company. He entered politics as a Democrat.

He was Register of Westchester County from 1893 to 1895. In 1893, he married Mary Louise Maher (died 1897).

Graney was a member of the New York State Assembly (Westchester Co., 2nd D.) in 1898; and a member of the New York State Senate (22nd D.) in 1899 and 1900.

He was again Register of Westchester County at the time of his death. He died on May 26, 1913, at his home at 33 Radford Street in Yonkers, New York, from "a complication of diseases".

== Sources ==
New York State Assembly
Preceded by Richard S. Emmet Jr.	New York State Assembly; Westchester County, 2nd District; 1898	Succeeded by William Henderson, Jr.
New York State Senate
Preceded by J. Irving Burns	New York State Senate; 22nd District; 1899–1900	Succeeded by Isaac N. Mills
