= Roy Chamberlain =

American judge

Roy H. Chamberlain
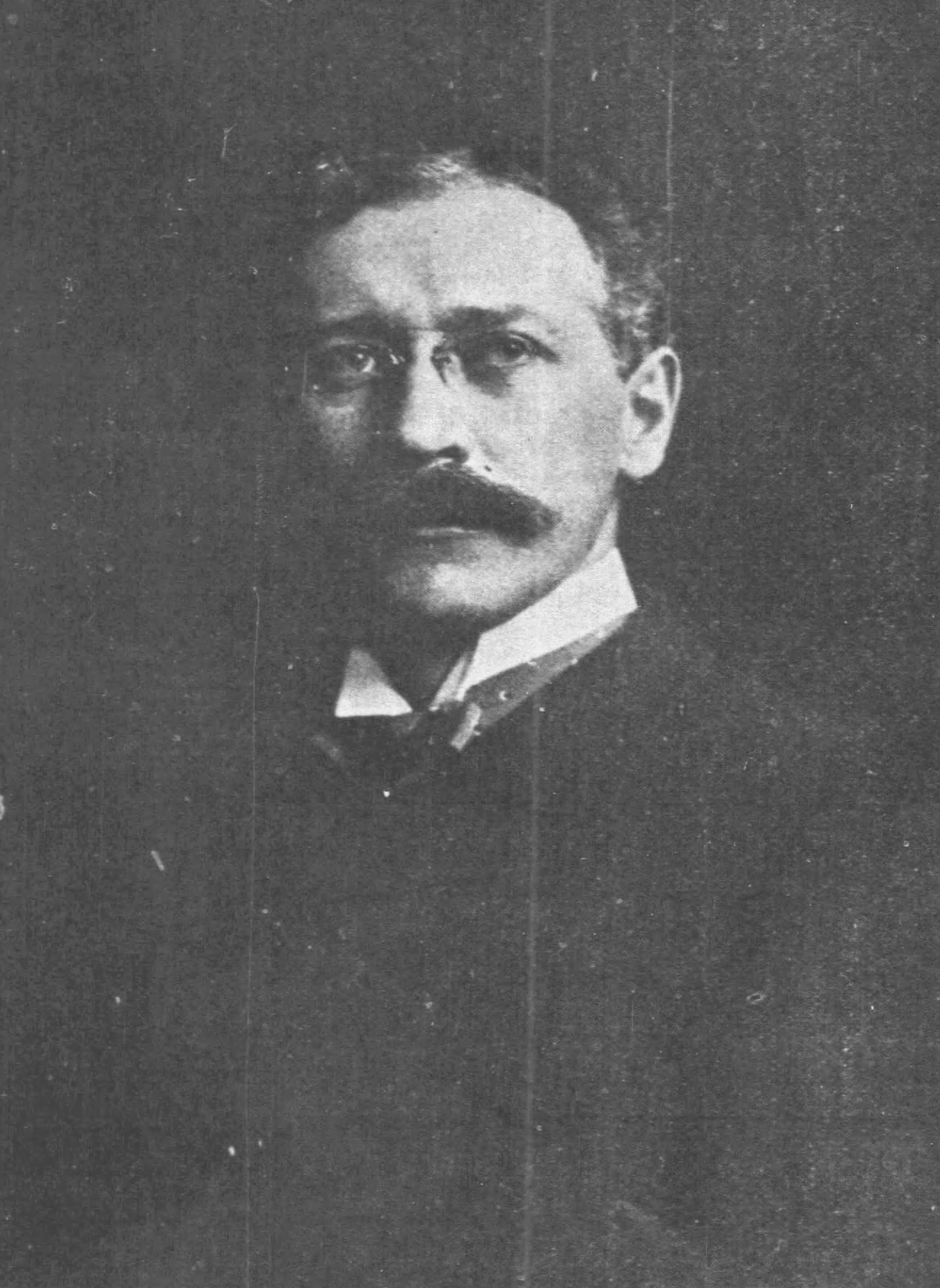

Member of the Board of General Appraisers
- In office June 3, 1908 – March 3, 1913
- Appointed by: Theodore Roosevelt
- Preceded by: Wilbur Fisk Lunt
- Succeeded by: George Stewart Brown

Personal details
- Born: Roy Hawley Chamberlain; April 16, 1862 Clarinda, Iowa, U.S.
- Died: August 30, 1953
- Spouse: Mary Margaret Hepburn

Roy Hawley Chamberlain (April 16, 1862 – August 30, 1953) was a Member of the Board of General Appraisers.

== Education and career ==
Chamberlain was born in 1862 in Clarinda, Iowa. He served as Postmaster of Clarinda from 1895 to 1899. He served as clerk and acting collector of customs for the United States Military and Naval Forces in Havana, Cuba from 1899 to 1901. He served as Collector of Internal Revenue in Honolulu, Hawaii from 1901 to 1908. He was the son-in-law of Iowa Congressman William Peters Hepburn.

== Federal judicial service ==
Chamberlain received a recess appointment from President Theodore Roosevelt on June 3, 1908, to a seat on the Board of General Appraisers vacated by Member Wilbur Fisk Lunt. He was nominated to the same position by President Roosevelt on December 8, 1908. He was confirmed by the United States Senate on January 11, 1909, and received his commission on January 15, 1909. His service terminated on March 3, 1913, due to his removal from office by President William Howard Taft. He was succeeded by George Stewart Brown.

=== Circumstances of his removal from office ===
Chamberlain's removal from office followed an investigation by a commission appointed for the purpose and consisting of Assistant Attorney General Winfred T. Dennison, Collector of the Port of New York William Loeb and law officer of the Bureau of Insular Affairs Felix Frankfurter future Supreme Court Justice. Chamberlain had been accused of incompetence in office. The commission determined on February 13, 1913, that Chamberlain was not an attorney and was not qualified to hold office. The commission further determined that decisions written by Chamberlain while on the Board had actually been prepared by another person. On March 3, 1913, President Taft upheld the commission's decision and removed Chamberlain from office.

== Later life and death ==
After his removal from office, Chamberlain worked as a grocer in Bradford, Pennsylvania from 1920 to 1930.

Legal offices
Preceded by Wilbur Fisk Lunt	Member of the Board of General Appraisers; 1908–1913	Succeeded by George Stewart Brown
