= Marcus W. Acheson =

American judge (1828–1906)

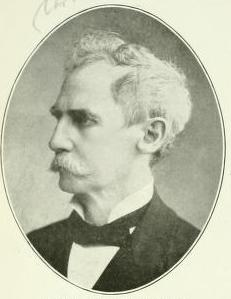

Judge of the United States Court of Appeals for the Third Circuit
- In office June 16, 1891 – June 21, 1906
- Appointed by: operation of law
- Preceded by: Seat established by 26 Stat. 826
- Succeeded by: Joseph Buffington

Judge of the United States Circuit Courts for the Third Circuit
- In office February 3, 1891 – June 21, 1906
- Appointed by: Benjamin Harrison
- Preceded by: William McKennan
- Succeeded by: Joseph Buffington

Judge of the United States District Court for the Western District of Pennsylvania
- In office January 14, 1880 – February 9, 1891
- Appointed by: Rutherford B. Hayes
- Preceded by: Winthrop Welles Ketcham
- Succeeded by: James Hay Reed

Personal details
- Born: Marcus Wilson Acheson; June 7, 1828 Washington, Pennsylvania
- Died: June 21, 1906 (aged 78) Pittsburgh, Pennsylvania
- Resting place: Allegheny Cemetery
- Spouse: Sophie Reiter
- Parents: David Acheson (father); Mary Wilson (mother)
- Education: Washington & Jefferson College (BA & LLD)
- Occupation: jurist

Marcus Wilson Acheson (June 7, 1828 – June 21, 1906), frequently known as M. W. Acheson, was a United States circuit judge of the United States Court of Appeals for the Third Circuit and of the United States Circuit Courts for the Third Circuit and previously was a United States district judge of the United States District Court for the Western District of Pennsylvania.

== Early life, education and career ==
Acheson was born on June 7, 1828, in Washington, Pennsylvania, son of David and Mary (Wilson) Acheson. He received a Bachelor of Arts degree in 1845 from Washington College (now Washington & Jefferson College) and read law in 1852. He was in private practice in Pittsburgh, Pennsylvania from 1852 to 1880. He received the honorary degree of LL.D. from Washington and Jefferson College in 1881.

== Federal judicial service ==
Acheson was nominated by President Rutherford B. Hayes on January 6, 1880, to a seat on the United States District Court for the Western District of Pennsylvania vacated by Judge Winthrop Welles Ketcham. He was confirmed by the United States Senate on January 14, 1880, and received his commission the same day. His service terminated on February 9, 1891, due to his elevation to the Third Circuit.

Acheson was nominated by President Benjamin Harrison on January 23, 1891, to a seat on the United States Circuit Courts for the Third Circuit vacated by Judge William McKennan. He was confirmed by the Senate on February 3, 1891, and received his commission the same day. Acheson was assigned by operation of law to additional and concurrent service on the United States Court of Appeals for the Third Circuit on June 16, 1891, to a new seat authorized by 26 Stat. 826 (Evarts Act). His service terminated on June 21, 1906, due to his death.

== Personal life and death ==
Acheson was married to Sophie Reiter on June 9, 1859.

He died of cerebral hemorrhage in Pittsburgh at the age of 78, and was buried at Allegheny Cemetery.

== Sources ==
- Acheson's entry at Burke's Peerage and Gentry

Legal offices
Preceded by Winthrop Welles Ketcham	Judge of the United States District Court for the Western District of Pennsylvania; 1880–1891	Succeeded by James Hay Reed
Preceded by William McKennan	Judge of the United States Circuit Courts for the Third Circuit; 1891–1906	Succeeded by Joseph Buffington
Preceded by Seat established by 26 Stat. 826	Judge of the United States Court of Appeals for the Third Circuit; 1891–1906	Succeeded by Joseph Buffington
