= J. Irving Burns =

American politician

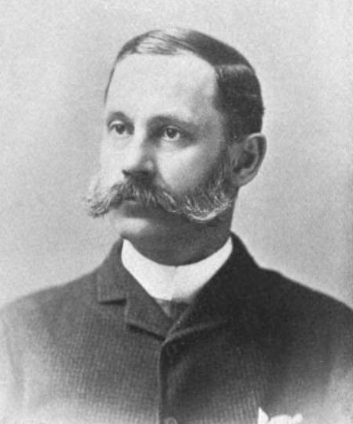
J. Irving Burns (1897)

James Irving Burns (August 10, 1843 – December 17, 1925) was an American lawyer and politician from New York.

== Life ==
J. Irving Burns was born in Biddeford, Maine on August 10, 1843, the son of Jeremiah Burns (died 1874) and Aphia (Dennett) Burns (died 1901). The family removed to Yonkers, New York, in the 1850s. He attended Colgate University in 1859 and 1860. He graduated from Union College in 1862, and from Columbian College Law School.

He was secretary and treasurer of Rutgers Female College (located on Fifth Avenue in New York City) for seven years, and superintendent of Bonded Warehouses of the Port of New York from 1874 to 1884. Then he became manager of the Knickerbocker Subscription Agency, and president of the Spring Creek and Rockerville Water and Mining Company of South Dakota.

He was an alderman of Yonkers in 1883 and 1884; and a member of the New York State Assembly (Westchester Co., 1st D.) in 1887, 1888, 1890 and 1895.

He was a member of the New York State Senate (22nd D.) from 1896 to 1898, sitting in the 119th, 120th and 121st New York State Legislatures.

He died from pneumonia in Yonkers on December 17, 1925.

== Sources ==
- Biographical sketches of the members of the Legislature in The Evening Journal Almanac (1888)
- Sketches of the members of the Legislature in The Evening Journal Almanac (1895; pg. 58)
- The New York Red Book compiled by Edgar L. Murlin (published by James B. Lyon, Albany NY, 1897; pg. 137f, 404, 506ff and 512)

New York State Assembly
Preceded by Charles P. McClelland	New York State Assembly; Westchester County, 1st District; 1887–1888	Succeeded by William Murray
Preceded by William Murray	New York State Assembly; Westchester County, 1st District; 1890	Succeeded by Charles P. McClelland
Preceded by John C. Harrigan	New York State Assembly; Westchester County, 1st District; 1895	Succeeded by John N. Stewart
New York State Senate
Preceded by Joseph Mullin	New York State Senate; 22nd District; 1896–1898	Succeeded by William J. Graney
