= Linwood Clark =

American politician (1876–1965)

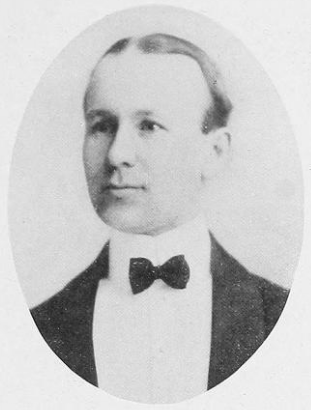

Member of the U.S. House of Representatives from Maryland's 2nd district
- In office March 4, 1929 – March 3, 1931
- Preceded by: William P. Cole, Jr.
- Succeeded by: William P. Cole, Jr.

Personal details
- Born: Linwood Leon Clark; March 21, 1876 Aberdeen, Maryland, U.S.
- Died: November 18, 1965 (aged 89) Annapolis, Maryland, U.S.
- Party: Republican
- Spouse: Linnie Habersank (m. 1907)
- Education: Milton Academy; University of Maryland, Baltimore
- Occupation: Lawyer; politician

Linwood Leon Clark (March 21, 1876 – November 18, 1965) was an American firefighter and politician who served as a member of the U.S. House of Representatives from Maryland's 2nd congressional district from 1929 to 1931.

Born in Aberdeen, Maryland, Clark attended public school and graduated from Milton Academy in Milton, Massachusetts in 1899. He graduated from American University in Harriman, Tennessee, in 1902, and from the law department of the University of Maryland, Baltimore, in 1904. He was admitted to the bar the same year and commenced practice in Baltimore. He also completed a course in railway transportation at La Salle Extension University in 1919. He married Linnie Habersank on July 24, 1907; they had two children.

In 1926, he ran as a Republican for the U.S. House, but lost to incumbent William P. Cole, Jr. He defeated Cole in a rematch in 1928, and was elected to the 71st United States Congress. He served for a single term from March 4, 1929, to March 3, 1931, but lost reelection to his predecessor in 1930. He resumed the practice of law in Baltimore, and served as judge of the circuit court of Maryland, fifth judicial district from 1935 to 1938. Later, he practiced law in Annapolis, where he died in 1965. He is interred in the Woodlawn Cemetery of Baltimore.

== Electoral history ==
Electoral history of Linwood Clark
Year	Office		Party	Votes			Result	Swing	Ref.
Year	Office		Party	Total	%	P.	Result	Swing	Ref.
1926	U.S. House	8th	Republican	34,327	40.18	2nd	Lost	Hold	
1928	U.S. House	8th	Republican	69,267	53.34	1st	Won	Gain	
1930	U.S. House	8th	Republican	54,914	40.71	2nd	Lost	Gain	
Source: Clerk of the U.S. House | Election Statistics

U.S. House of Representatives
Preceded by William P. Cole, Jr.	U.S. Congressman from the 2nd district of Maryland; 1929–1931	Succeeded by William P. Cole, Jr.
