= List of federal judges appointed by Benjamin Harrison =

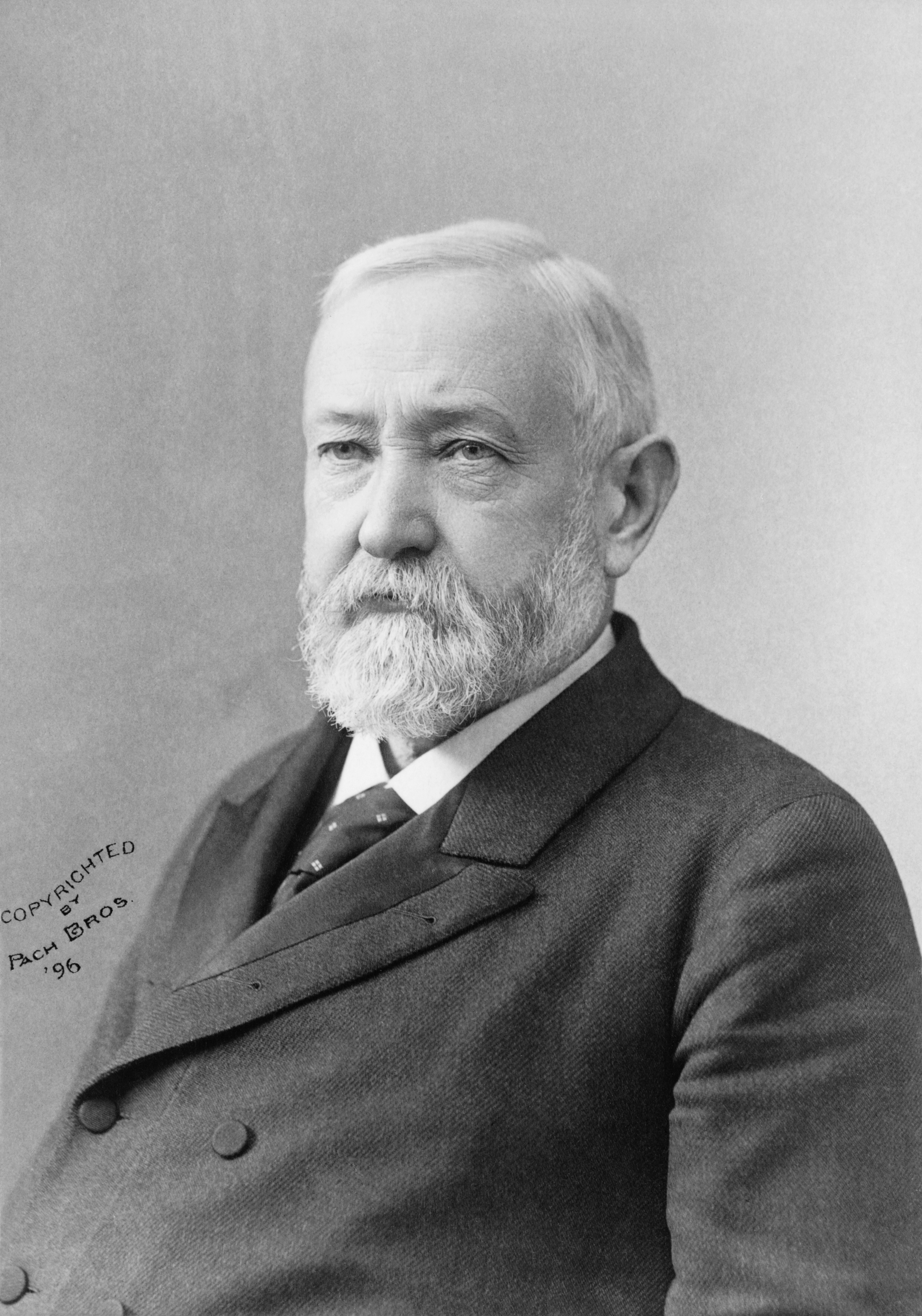
President Benjamin Harrison.

Following is a list of all Article III United States federal judges appointed by President Benjamin Harrison during his presidency. In total Harrison appointed 42 Article III federal judges, including 4 Justices to the Supreme Court of the United States, 12 judges to the United States courts of appeals and United States circuit courts and 26 judges to the United States district courts.

Additionally, Harrison appointed 1 judge to the United States Court of Claims and 10 members to the Board of General Appraisers (later the United States Customs Court), both Article I tribunals.

The Judiciary Act of 1891, approved March 3, 1891, established the United States courts of appeals. Prior to the passage of that act, United States Circuit Judges were appointed solely to the existing United States circuit courts. Subsequent to the passage of that act, United States Circuit Judges were concurrently appointed to both the United States courts of appeals and the United States circuit courts. This situation persisted until the abolition of the United States circuit courts on December 31, 1911. Starting January 1, 1912, United States Circuit Judges served only upon their respective United States court of appeals.

Thus, the first 2 United States Circuit Judges appointed during Harrison's administration were appointed solely to the United States circuit court for their respective circuit and were reassigned by operation of law to serve concurrently on the United States court of appeals and United States circuit court on June 16, 1891. The 10 United States Circuit Judges appointed by Harrison after June 16, 1891, were appointed concurrently to the United States court of appeals and United States circuit court.

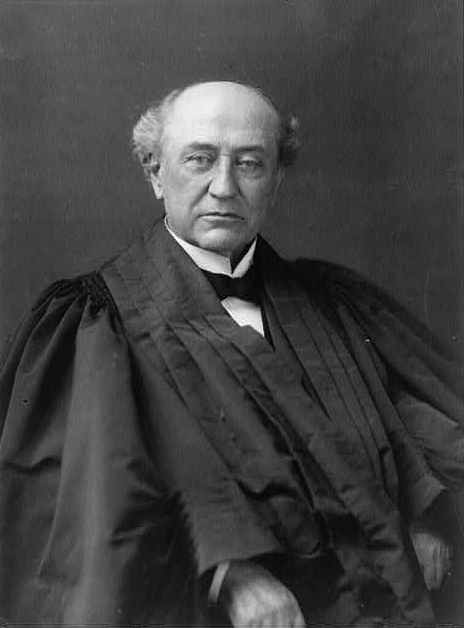
David Josiah Brewer was Harrison's first appointee to the Supreme Court, and his longest serving.

Harrison appointed William Howard Taft to the United States Court of Appeals for the Sixth Circuit.

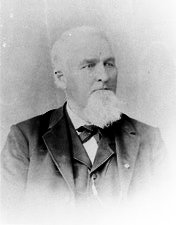
Alonzo J. Edgerton was appointed by Harrison as the first judge for the newly created United States District Court for the District of South Dakota.

== United States Supreme Court justices ==
| # | Justice | Seat | State | Former justice | Nomination date | Confirmation date | Began active service | Ended active service |
|---|---|---|---|---|---|---|---|---|
| 1 | David J. Brewer | 6 | Kansas | Stanley Matthews | December 4, 1889 | December 18, 1889 | December 18, 1889 | March 28, 1910 |
| 2 | Henry Billings Brown | 4 | Michigan | Samuel Freeman Miller | December 23, 1890 | December 29, 1890 | December 29, 1890 | May 28, 1906 |
| 3 | George Shiras Jr. | 10 | Pennsylvania | Joseph P. Bradley | July 19, 1892 | July 26, 1892 | July 26, 1892 | February 23, 1903 |
| 4 | Howell Edmunds Jackson | 3 | Tennessee | Lucius Q. C. Lamar II | February 2, 1893 | February 18, 1893 | February 18, 1893 | August 8, 1895 |

== Courts of appeals and circuit courts ==
| # | Judge | Circuit | Nomination date | Confirmation date | Began active service | Ended active service |
|---|---|---|---|---|---|---|
| 1 | Henry Clay Caldwell | Eighth | February 27, 1890 | March 4, 1890 | March 4, 1890 | June 4, 1903 |
| 2 | Marcus W. Acheson | Third | January 23, 1891 | February 3, 1891 | February 3, 1891 | June 21, 1906 |
| 3 | George M. Dallas | Third | December 16, 1891 | March 17, 1892 | March 17, 1892 | May 24, 1909 |
| 4 | Nathan Goff Jr. | Fourth | December 16, 1891 | March 17, 1892 | March 17, 1892 | March 31, 1913 |
| 5 | Andrew Phelps McCormick | Fifth | January 5, 1892 | March 17, 1892 | March 17, 1892 | November 2, 1916 |
| 6 | Joseph McKenna | Ninth | February 11, 1892 | March 17, 1892 | March 17, 1892 | March 5, 1897 |
| 7 | William LeBaron Putnam | First | December 16, 1891 | March 17, 1892 | March 17, 1892 | September 17, 1917 |
| 8 | Walter Henry Sanborn | Eighth | February 10, 1892 | March 17, 1892 | March 17, 1892 | May 10, 1928 |
| 9 | Nathaniel Shipman | Second | December 16, 1891 | March 17, 1892 | March 17, 1892 | March 22, 1902 |
| 10 | William Howard Taft | Sixth | December 16, 1891 | March 17, 1892 | March 17, 1892 | March 15, 1900 |
| 11 | William Allen Woods | Seventh | December 16, 1891 | March 17, 1892 | March 17, 1892 | June 29, 1901 |
| 12 | William Ball Gilbert | Ninth | February 23, 1892 | March 18, 1892 | March 18, 1892 | April 27, 1931 |

== District courts ==
| # | Judge | Court (Note: See List of United States district and territorial courts) | Nomination date | Confirmation date | Began active service | Ended active service | Ended senior service |
|---|---|---|---|---|---|---|---|
| 1 | Andrew Coyle Bradley | D.D.C. | March 19, 1889 | March 23, 1889 | March 23, 1889 | May 15, 1902 | – |
| 2 | Charles Swayne | N.D. Fla. | December 5, 1889 | April 1, 1890 | May 17, 1889 | July 5, 1907 | – |
| 3 | Augustus J. Ricks | N.D. Ohio | December 16, 1889 | January 16, 1890 | July 1, 1889 | December 22, 1906 | – |
| 4 | Edward T. Green | D.N.J. | December 16, 1889 | January 27, 1890 | October 24, 1889 | October 10, 1896 | – |
| 5 | Alonzo J. Edgerton | D.S.D. | December 16, 1889 | January 16, 1890 | November 19, 1889 | August 9, 1896 | – |
| 6 | Hiram Knowles | D. Mont. | January 6, 1890 | February 21, 1890 | February 21, 1890 | April 15, 1904 | – |
| 7 | Cornelius H. Hanford | D. Wash. / W.D. Wash. | February 10, 1890 | February 25, 1890 | February 25, 1890 | March 2, 1905 | – |
| 8 | Alfred Delavan Thomas | D.N.D. | February 19, 1890 | February 25, 1890 | February 25, 1890 | August 8, 1896 | – |
| 9 | David Ezekiel Bryant | E.D. Tex. | May 3, 1890 | May 27, 1890 | May 27, 1890 | February 5, 1910 | – |
| 10 | Thomas Porter Hawley | D. Nev. | August 30, 1890 | September 9, 1890 | September 9, 1890 | June 30, 1906 | – |
| 11 | John Alden Riner | D. Wyo. | September 20, 1890 | September 22, 1890 | September 22, 1890 | October 31, 1921 | March 4, 1923 |
| 12 | John A. Williams | E.D. Ark. | August 14, 1890 | September 22, 1890 | September 22, 1890 | July 7, 1900 | – |
| 13 | Henry Harrison Swan | E.D. Mich. | January 13, 1891 | January 19, 1891 | January 19, 1891 | July 1, 1911 | – |
| 14 | Edgar Aldrich | D.N.H. | February 16, 1891 | February 20, 1891 | February 20, 1891 | September 15, 1921 | – |
| 15 | James Hay Reed | W.D. Pa. | February 10, 1891 | February 20, 1891 | February 20, 1891 | January 15, 1892 | – |
| 16 | James H. Beatty | D. Idaho | February 10, 1891 (Note: Renominated on December 10, 1891.) | February 4, 1892 | March 7, 1891 | March 1, 1907 | – |
| 17 | William W. Morrow | N.D. Cal. | December 10, 1891 | January 11, 1892 | August 11, 1891 | June 1, 1897 | Elevated |
| 18 | Henry Clay Niles | N.D. Miss. S.D. Miss. | December 10, 1891 | January 11, 1892 | August 11, 1891 | September 26, 1918 | – |
| 19 | John Simson Woolson | S.D. Iowa | December 10, 1891 | January 11, 1892 | August 14, 1891 | December 4, 1899 | – |
| 20 | Joseph Buffington | W.D. Pa. | February 10, 1892 | February 23, 1892 | February 23, 1892 | September 26, 1906 | Elevated |
| 21 | John B. Rector | N.D. Tex. | March 24, 1892 | March 28, 1892 | March 28, 1892 | April 9, 1898 | – |
| 22 | William Kneeland Townsend | D. Conn. | March 24, 1892 | March 28, 1892 | March 28, 1892 | February 27, 1902 | Elevated |
| 23 | John Baker | D. Ind. | March 24, 1892 | March 29, 1892 | March 29, 1892 | December 8, 1902 | – |
| 24 | Louis E. McComas | D.D.C. | December 6, 1892 | January 25, 1893 | November 17, 1892 | March 3, 1899 | – |
| 25 | Peter S. Grosscup | N.D. Ill. | December 12, 1892 | December 20, 1892 | December 20, 1892 | February 1, 1899 | Elevated |
| 26 | Charles Cleaves Cole | D.D.C. | December 12, 1892 | January 28, 1893 | January 28, 1893 | April 22, 1901 | – |

== Specialty courts (Article I) ==
=== United States Court of Claims ===
| # | Judge | Nomination date | Confirmation date | Began active service | Ended active service |
|---|---|---|---|---|---|
| 1 | Stanton J. Peelle | March 24, 1892 | March 28, 1892 | March 28, 1892 | January 2, 1906 |

=== Board of General Appraisers ===
| # | Judge | Nomination date | Confirmation date | Began active service | Ended active service |
|---|---|---|---|---|---|
| 1 | Charles H. Ham | July 2, 1890 | July 16, 1890 | July 16, 1890 | August 1, 1902 |
| 2 | George C. Tichenor | July 2, 1890 | July 16, 1890 | July 16, 1890 | July 11, 1902 |
| 3 | Joseph Biddle Wilkinson Jr. | July 2, 1890 | July 16, 1890 | July 16, 1890 | December 15, 1899 |
| 4 | James A. Jewell | July 2, 1890 | July 16, 1890 | July 17, 1890 | July 15, 1903; August 12, 1903 |
| 5 | Henderson M. Somerville | July 17, 1890 | July 18, 1890 | July 22, 1890 | September 15, 1915 |
| 6 | Ferdinand N. Shurtleff | July 17, 1890 | July 18, 1890 | July 22, 1890 | May 12, 1899 |
| 7 | Joseph Lewis Stackpole | July 17, 1890 | July 18, 1890 | July 22, 1890 | December 5, 1890 |
| 8 | Thaddeus S. Sharretts | July 30, 1890 | July 30, 1890 | July 30, 1890 | March 3, 1913 |
| 9 | George H. Sharpe | July 2, 1890 | July 16, 1890 | November 16, 1890 | March 1, 1899 |
| 10 | Wilbur Fisk Lunt | January 21, 1891 | January 27, 1891 | January 28, 1891 | May 28, 1908 |

== Notes ==
Renominations

== Sources ==
- Federal Judicial Center
