= John P. Cohalan =

American politician

John P. Cohalan (March 17, 1873 Brooklyn, Kings County, New York – 1950) was an American lawyer and politician from New York.

== Life ==
He was the son of Timothy E. Cohalan and Ellen (O'Leary) Cohalan. The family removed to Middletown in the Summer of 1873; and to the Bronx in September 1889. He graduated from Wallkill Academy in 1889, and from Manhattan College in 1893. Then he studied law, was admitted to the bar in 1895, and practiced in New York City. In 1898, he married Margaret Kiernan (1876–1964), and they had several children.

Cohalan was a member of the New York State Assembly (New York Co., 35th D.) in 1906; a member of the New York State Senate (22nd D.) in 1907 and 1908; and Surrogate of New York County from 1909 to 1922.

He died in 1950, and was buried at the Old St. Raymond's Cemetery in the Bronx.

New York Supreme Court Justice Daniel F. Cohalan (1867–1946) was his brother.

== Sources ==
- Official New York from Cleveland to Hughes by Charles Elliott Fitch (Hurd Publishing Co., New York and Buffalo, 1911, Vol. IV; pg. 352 and 366)
- TAMMANY NAMES LEHMAN, COHALAN in NYT on October 8, 1908
- FEW FEET OF LAND COST CITY THOUSANDS in NYT on December 5, 1908
- DIX NAMES COHALAN FOR SUPREME COURT in NYT on May 19, 1911
- COHALAN TURNDOWN DENOUNCED BY BAR in NYT on October 12, 1922

New York State Assembly
Preceded by Peter J. Everett	New York State Assembly; New York Country, 35th District; 1906	Succeeded by John V. Sheridan
New York State Senate
Preceded by Francis M. Carpenter	New York State Senate; 19th District; 1907–1908	Succeeded by George M. S. Schulz
