= Webster Oliver =

American judge

Webster J. Oliver

Senior Judge of the United States Customs Court
- In office June 24, 1967 – November 16, 1969

Presiding Judge of the United States Customs Court
- In office 1940–1965
- Preceded by: George Stewart Brown
- Succeeded by: Paul Peter Rao

Judge of the United States Customs Court
- In office June 24, 1940 – June 24, 1967
- Appointed by: Franklin D. Roosevelt
- Preceded by: Charles P. McClelland
- Succeeded by: Samuel Murray Rosenstein

Personal details
- Born: Webster J. Oliver; January 14, 1888 Brooklyn, New York, U.S.
- Died: November 16, 1969 (aged 81) New York City, New York, U.S.
- Education: Brooklyn Law School (LL.B.)

Webster J. Oliver (January 14, 1888 – November 16, 1969) was a chief judge of the United States Customs Court.

== Education and career ==
Born on January 14, 1888, in Brooklyn, New York, Oliver received a Bachelor of Laws in 1911 from Brooklyn Law School. He worked in private practice from 1912 to 1917 and again from 1919 to 1935. He served as a captain in the United States Army Ordnance Corps from 1917 to 1919. He served as a special attorney for the Customs Division of the United States Department of Justice from 1935 to 1938. He served as Assistant Attorney General of the Customs Division of the United States Department of Justice from 1938 to 1940.

== Federal Judicial Service ==
Oliver was nominated by President Franklin D. Roosevelt on June 11, 1940, to a seat on the United States Customs Court vacated by Judge Charles P. McClelland. He was confirmed by the United States Senate on June 18, 1940, and received his commission on June 24, 1940. He served as Presiding Judge from 1940 to 1965. Oliver was initially appointed as a Judge under Article I, but the court was raised to Article III status by operation of law on July 14, 1956, and Oliver thereafter served as an Article III Judge. He assumed senior status on June 24, 1967. His service terminated on November 16, 1969, due to his death in New York City, New York.

== Sources ==
Legal offices
Preceded by Charles P. McClelland	Judge of the United States Customs Court; 1940–1967	Succeeded by Samuel Murray Rosenstein
Preceded by George Stewart Brown	Presiding Judge of the United States Customs Court; 1940–1965	Succeeded by Paul Peter Rao
