= George A. Gordon =

American diplomat

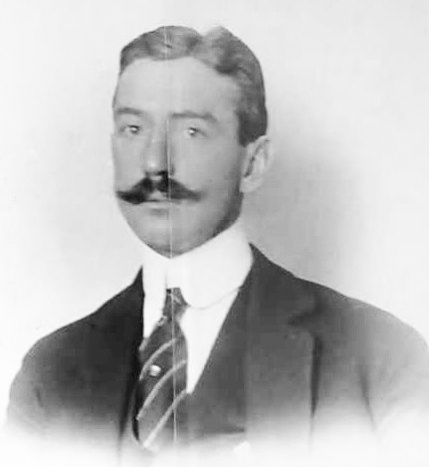
George A. Gordon's 1920 diplomatic passport photo.

George A. Gordon (November 19, 1885 – May 11, 1959) was an American attorney and diplomat who served as United States Ambassador to Haiti and as United States Ambassador to the Netherlands.

== Life and career ==
George Anderson Gordon was born in Huntsville, Alabama on November 19, 1885. He was the son of Percy Gordon, son of George Anderson Gordon, and Nancy Reed French.

He graduated from Harvard University in 1906 and taught at St. Paul's School until 1909. In 1912 he received his law degree from Columbia University School of Law, and he became an attorney in New York City.

In 1916 Gordon joined the United States Army and served in the Pancho Villa Expedition. During World War I he was assigned as a captain in France, and after the war he served on the staff that supported the U.S. commissioners who negotiated the Treaty of Versailles.

Gordon became a career foreign service employee in 1920, and served at embassies in Paris, Budapest, Berlin, and Rio de Janeiro. In 1930 he married Alice Vandergrift Garrett.

In 1935 he was appointed as Ambassador to Haiti, where he served until 1937.

In 1937 he became Ambassador to the Netherlands, serving until the Nazi invasion in 1940, after which he closed down the embassy and departed.

Upon returning to the United States Gordon spent the rest of World War II working on foreign policy issues at the State Department, including reorganization and formal re-recognition of Czechoslovakia following its occupation by the Nazis. He retired in 1945.

Gordon died in New York City on May 11, 1959.

== External Resources ==
- George Gordon Anderson biography, Office of the Historian, United States Department of State

Diplomatic posts
Preceded by Norman Armour	United States Ambassador to Haiti; 1935–1937	Succeeded by Ferdinand L. Mayer
Preceded by Grenville T. Emmet	United States Ambassador to the Netherlands; 1937–1940	Succeeded by Anthony J. Drexel Biddle, Jr.
