= Grenville T. Emmet =

American lawyer and diplomat

U.S. Minister to Austria
- In office September 14, 1937 – September 26, 1937
- President: Franklin D. Roosevelt
- Preceded by: George S. Messersmith
- Succeeded by: John C. Wiley

U.S. Minister to the Netherlands
- In office March 21, 1934 – August 21, 1937
- President: Franklin D. Roosevelt
- Preceded by: Laurits S. Swenson
- Succeeded by: George A. Gordon

Personal details
- Born: Grenville Temple Emmet; August 2, 1877 New Rochelle, New York, U.S.
- Died: September 26, 1937 (aged 60) Vienna, Austria
- Party: Democratic
- Spouse: Pauline Annie Ferguson (m. 1905)
- Relations: Richard S. Emmet Jr. (brother)
- Education: St. Paul's School
- Alma mater: Harvard University; New York Law School

Grenville Temple Emmet (August 2, 1877 – September 26, 1937) was an American attorney and diplomat. He practiced law alongside Franklin D. Roosevelt and later served as the United States Minister to the Netherlands and to Austria.

== Early life ==
Emmet was born in New Rochelle, New York, on August 2, 1877. He was the son of Richard Stockton Emmet Sr. (1820–1902) and Katherine (née Temple) Emmet. Among his siblings were older brothers William Temple Emmet and Richard S. Emmet Jr., a Republican member of the New York State Assembly; and sisters Katherine Temple Emmet (wife of New York Supreme Court Justice Martin J. Keogh), Elizabeth LeRoy Emmet (wife of Nicholas Biddle), and Eleanor Emmet (wife of John Willard Lapsley).

His paternal grandparents were Robert Emmet, a New York judge, and Rosina (née Hubley) Emmet. Among his extended family were his first cousins, artists Ellen Emmet Rand, Lydia Field Emmet, Rosina Emmet Sherwood, and Jane Emmet de Glehn (wife of British painter Wilfrid de Glehn); engineer William LeRoy Emmet; golf course architect Devereux Emmet; and military officer Robert Temple Emmet. His great-grandfather was Thomas Addis Emmet, a former New York Attorney General and prominent leader of the United Irishmen who was exiled to the United States.

Emmet was educated at St. Paul's School in Concord, New Hampshire, and received his Bachelor of Arts degree from Harvard University in 1898.

== Career ==
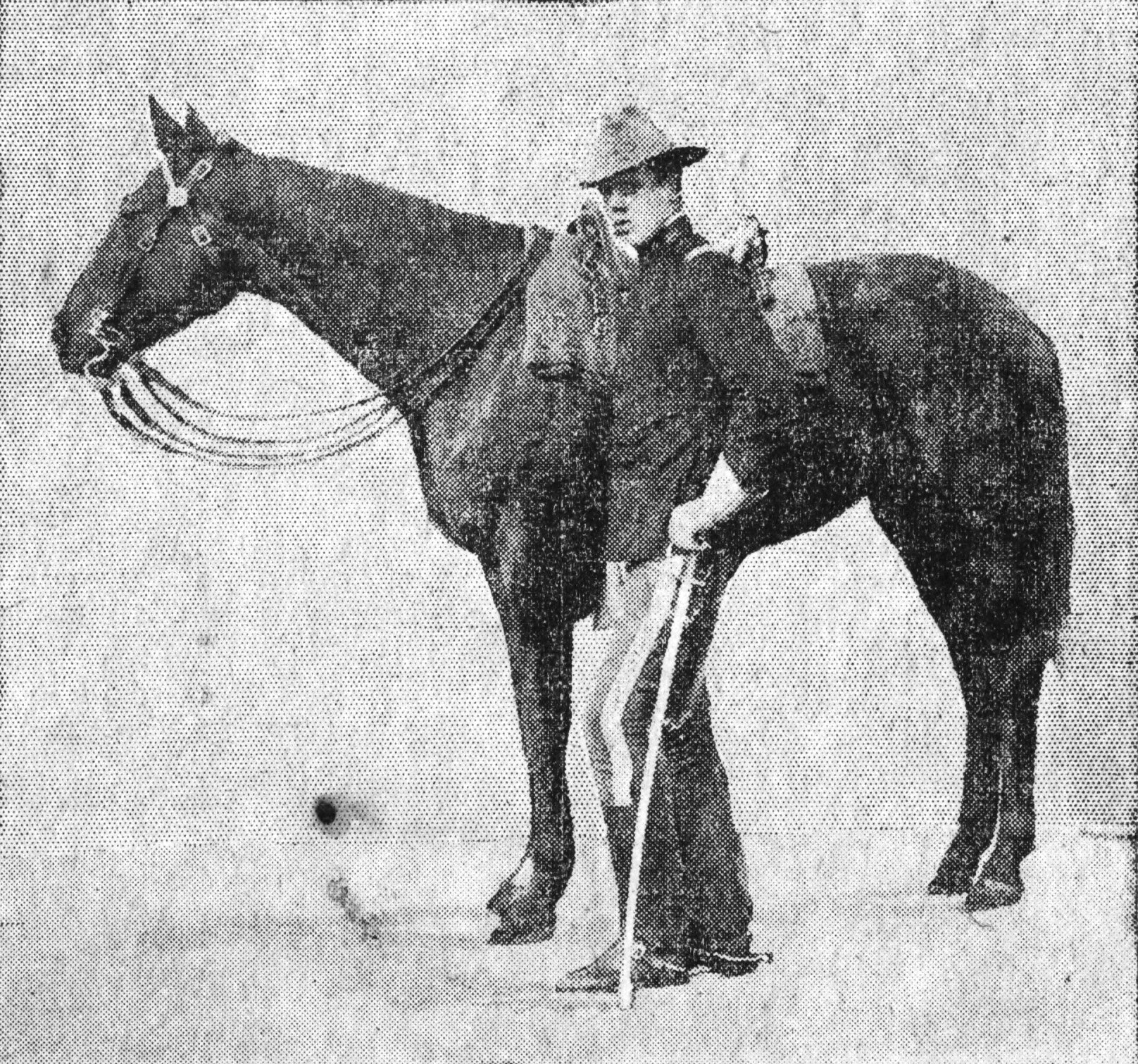
Grenville T. Emmet, ca. 1899

Following his graduation from Harvard, Emmet joined the New York National Guard's 69th Infantry Regiment in 1898 as a second lieutenant. He remained with the unit when it was federalized for service in the Spanish–American War. Emmet was promoted to first lieutenant and appointed as the regiment's adjutant. He continued to serve in the National Guard and remained active in veterans' organizations.

In 1901, Emmet received his law degree from New York Law School. After being admitted to the bar in June 1901, he joined his father's law firm, Emmet & Robinson, where he became a partner in 1903. He later practiced in partnership with Langdon Marvin and Franklin D. Roosevelt at Emmet, Marvin & Roosevelt, a firm originally founded by his great-grandfather, Thomas Addis Emmet, in 1805. Roosevelt, as a junior partner, practiced with Emmet at various times in his career, including during his run for vice president in the 1920 election. Roosevelt left the firm in 1923. It continued under the name Emmet, Marvin & Martin.

=== Diplomatic career ===
After Franklin D. Roosevelt became president on March 4, 1933, Emmet was rumored to be under consideration for various diplomatic posts, including U.S. Ambassador to Italy, and later as Minister to Portugal or Hungary, which he reportedly declined. He was subsequently mentioned as a potential candidate for Ambassador to Germany or Minister to Austria, due to his familiarity with Central European politics.

On December 27, 1933, Roosevelt, a fellow Democrat and former law partner of Emmet, appointed him as U.S. Minister to the Netherlands. Emmet was initially commissioned during a Senate recess and was formally reappointed by Roosevelt on January 15, 1934, succeeding Laurits S. Swenson, who had been appointed by President Herbert Hoover. He presented his credentials on March 21, 1934, and served as U.S. Minister until August 21, 1937.

Following the appointment of U.S. Minister George S. Messersmith as Assistant Secretary of State under Secretary Cordell Hull in 1937, Roosevelt nominated Emmet to succeed Messersmith as U.S. Minister to Austria on July 13, 1937. Emmet, who was suffering from pneumonia upon his arrival in Austria, presented his credentials to President Wilhelm Miklas in Vienna on September 14, 1937. However, he served in the post for less than two weeks before his death on September 26, 1937.

== Personal life ==
On September 18, 1905, Emmet married Pauline Annie Ferguson (1879–1947), the daughter of New York-born Paul Dudley Ferguson, the co-founder and treasurer of Gordon & Ferguson in St. Paul, Minnesota. Together, they lived at 39 East 63rd Street and later at 3 East 94th Street in Manhattan (both designed by noted architect Mott B. Schmidt), and between November 1913 and October 1919, owned Bonito, a mansion and estate overlooking the Atlantic Ocean located at 466 Gin Lane in Southampton, New York. Pauline and Grenville were the parents of:

- Pauline Temple Emmet (1906–1989), who died unmarried.
- Grenville Temple Emmet Jr. (1909–1989), who married Anne Livingston Eustis (1915–1989), daughter of William Corcoran Eustis (and granddaughter of U.S. Vice President Levi P. Morton), in 1937. He later married Elizabeth Chace (1911–2013) in 1973.
- Elizabeth Patricia Emmet (1918–1959), who died unmarried.

He was a member of the Racquet and Tennis Club, the Downtown Club, the Knickerbocker Club, the Harvard Club of New York City, the Bedford Golf and Tennis Club, and the New York City Bar Association.

Emmet died at the Hotel Bristol in Vienna on September 26, 1937. After a funeral at the English Church in Vienna, he was buried at Saint Matthew's Episcopal Church in Bedford, New York.

== External resources ==
- Grenville Temple Emmet biography at the Office of the Historian, U.S. Department of State
- Grenville T. Emmet at Find a Grave

Diplomatic posts
| Preceded by Laurits S. Swenson | U.S. Minister to the Netherlands; 1934–1937 | Succeeded by George A. Gordon |
| Preceded by George S. Messersmith | U.S. Minister to Austria; 1937–1937 | Succeeded by John C. Wiley |
