= James Hay Reed =

American judge (1853–1927)

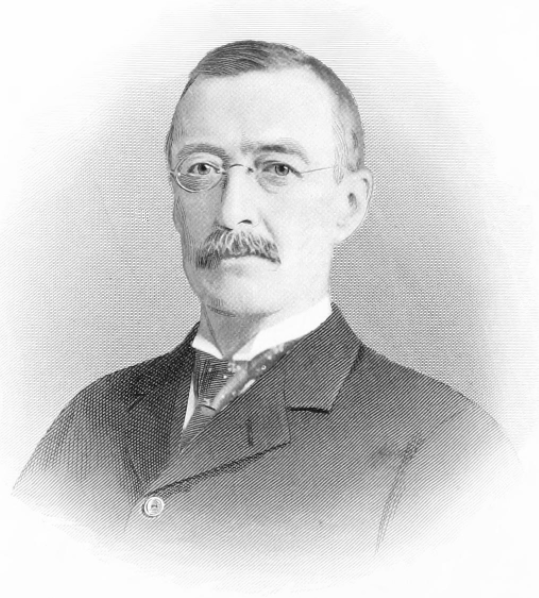

Judge of the United States District Court for the Western District of Pennsylvania
- In office February 20, 1891 – January 15, 1892
- Appointed by: Benjamin Harrison
- Preceded by: Marcus W. Acheson
- Succeeded by: Joseph Buffington

Personal details
- Born: September 10, 1853 Allegheny, Pennsylvania, US
- Died: June 17, 1927 (aged 73) Pittsburgh, Pennsylvania, US
- Resting place: Allegheny Cemetery
- Education: University of Pittsburgh (A.M.) read law
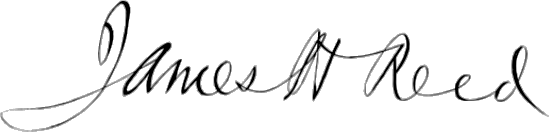
- Signature

James Hay Reed (September 10, 1853 – June 17, 1927) was a United States district judge of the United States District Court for the Western District of Pennsylvania. With partner Philander C. Knox, he formed the law firm of Knox and Reed.

== Early life and education ==
Born on September 10, 1853, in Allegheny, Pennsylvania, Reed received a Master of Arts degree in 1872 from the Western University of Pennsylvania (now the University of Pittsburgh) and read law in 1875.

== Career ==
Reed was in private practice, in Pittsburgh, Pennsylvania, from 1875 to 1891. In 1877, he formed the law firm of Knox and Reed (later Reed Smith) with Philander C. Knox which would eventually count the industrialist, Henry Clay Frick, and the wealthy Mellon family among its clients. He became a federal judge in 1891 and, following his resignation from the bench the following year, Reed resumed private practice in Pittsburgh, from 1892 to 1927.

=== Johnstown Flood ===
Reed and Knox were members of the South Fork Fishing and Hunting Club, which had a clubhouse upriver of Johnstown, Pennsylvania. It was responsible for maintenance of the South Fork Dam, which failed in May 1889, causing the Johnstown Flood and severe losses of life and property downriver. When word of the dam's failure was telegraphed to Pittsburgh, Frick and other members of the South Fork Club gathered to form the Pittsburgh Relief Committee for assistance to the flood victims.

As its attorneys; Knox and his law partner Reed were able to fend off four lawsuits against the club; Colonel Unger, its president; and against 50 named members. Each cases was "either settled or discontinued and, as far as is known, no one bringing action profited thereby." Despite a history of neglect and Daniel Johnson Morrell campaigning to club officials, especially to Ruff, its founder, regarding the safety of the dam, to no avail; the club was never held legally responsible for the disaster. Knox and Reed successfully argued that the dam's failure was a natural disaster, which was an Act of God, and no legal compensation was paid to the survivors of the flood. The perceived injustice aided the acceptance of “strict, joint, and several liability,” so that a “non-negligent defendant could be held liable for damage caused by the unnatural use of land. He also achieved some fame from settling a "bitter dispute" between fellow club members, business partners Andrew Carnegie and co-founder Henry Clay Frick, a decade later.

=== Federal judicial service ===
Reed was nominated by President Benjamin Harrison on February 10, 1891, to a seat on the United States District Court for the Western District of Pennsylvania vacated by Judge Marcus W. Acheson. He was confirmed by the United States Senate on February 20, 1891, and received his commission the same day. His service terminated on January 15, 1892, due to his resignation.

== Death ==
He died on June 17, 1927, in Pittsburgh, and was buried at Allegheny Cemetery.

== Legacy ==
American lake freighter SS James H. Reed (launched in 1903) was named after him.

== Sources ==
- "Business & Finance: Silver Scoop". Time. November 12, 1928 – via content.time.com.
- Cannadine, David (2006). Mellon: An American Life. Alfred A. Knopf. ISBN 0-679-45032-7.

Legal offices
Preceded by Marcus W. Acheson	Judge of the United States District Court for the Western District of Pennsylvania; 1891–1892	Succeeded by Joseph Buffington
