= Norton P. Otis =

American politician

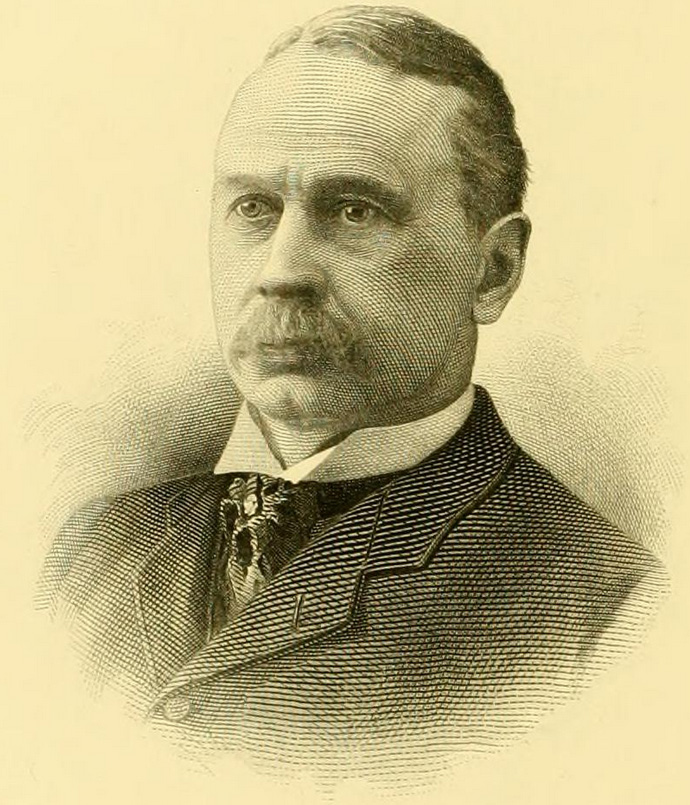

Member of the U.S. House of Representatives from New York's 19th district
- In office March 4, 1903 – February 20, 1905
- Preceded by: William Henry Draper
- Succeeded by: John Emory Andrus

Member of the New York State Assembly from the 1st Westchester district
- In office January 1, 1884 – December 31, 1884
- Preceded by: Edwin R. Keyes
- Succeeded by: Charles P. McClelland

Personal details
- Born: March 18, 1840 Halifax, Vermont, U.S.
- Died: February 20, 1905 (aged 64) Westchester County, New York, U.S.
- Party: Republican

Norton Prentiss Otis (March 18, 1840 – February 20, 1905) was a U.S. representative from New York.

== Biography ==
Coat of Arms of Norton P. Otis

Otis was born in Halifax, Vermont. His father was Elisha Otis, inventor of the safety elevator and a descendant of the Otis family that is counted among the Boston Brahmin families. He attended public schools in Halifax, Albany, Hudson, and Yonkers, New York. In his early youth, he entered into business with his father and engaged in the manufacture of elevators for nearly fifty years.

Otis served as mayor of Yonkers from 1880 to 1882 and was a member of the New York State Assembly (Westchester Co., 1st D.) in 1884. He served as president of the New York State Commission to the Exposition Universelle of 1900 and as president of St. John's Riverside Hospital of Yonkers. In 1900, he was an unsuccessful candidate for election to the 57th United States Congress.

Otis was elected as a Republican to the 58th United States Congress and represented New York's 19th congressional district from March 4, 1903 until his death from cancer in Westchester County, New York on February 20, 1905. He was interred at Oakland Cemetery. He also was related to Amelia Earhart.

== See also ==
- List of members of the United States Congress who died in office (1900–1949)

New York State Assembly
Preceded by Henry W. Keyes	New York State Assembly; Westchester County, 1st District; 1884	Succeeded by Charles P. McClelland
U.S. House of Representatives
Preceded by William Henry Draper	Member of the U.S. House of Representatives from New York's 19th congressional district March 4, 1903 – February 20, 1905	Succeeded by John Emory Andrus
