= William Purington Cole Jr. =

American politician and jurist

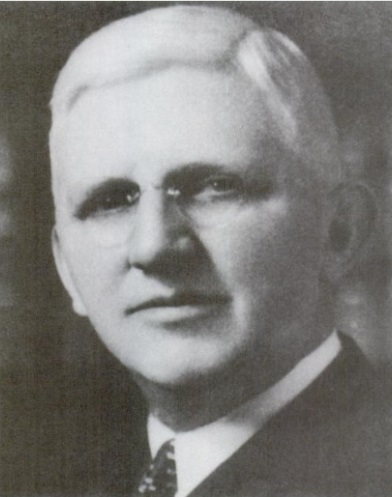
- From 1980's A Brief History of the United States Court of Customs and Patent Appeals

Associate Judge of the United States Court of Customs and Patent Appeals
- In office July 7, 1952 – September 22, 1957
- Appointed by: Harry S. Truman
- Preceded by: Joseph Raymond Jackson
- Succeeded by: Isaac Jack Martin

Judge of the United States Customs Court
- In office May 14, 1942 – July 9, 1952
- Appointed by: Franklin D. Roosevelt
- Preceded by: George Stewart Brown
- Succeeded by: David John Wilson

Member of the U.S. House of Representatives from Maryland's 2nd district
- In office March 4, 1931 – October 26, 1942
- Preceded by: Linwood Clark
- Succeeded by: Harry Streett Baldwin
- In office March 4, 1927 – March 3, 1929
- Preceded by: Millard Tydings
- Succeeded by: Linwood Clark

Personal details
- Born: May 11, 1889 Towson, Maryland, U.S.
- Died: September 22, 1957 (aged 68) Baltimore, Maryland, U.S.
- Resting place: Arlington National Cemetery
- Party: Democratic
- Education: University of Maryland, College Park (B.S.C.E.); University of Maryland School of Law
- Profession: Attorney

William Purington Cole Jr. (May 11, 1889 – September 22, 1957) was an American jurist and politician. From 1927 to 1929 and from 1931 to 1942, Cole was a United States representative who represented the second district of Maryland. He later served as a judge of the United States Customs Court and as an associate judge of the United States Court of Customs and Patent Appeals.

== Early life and education ==
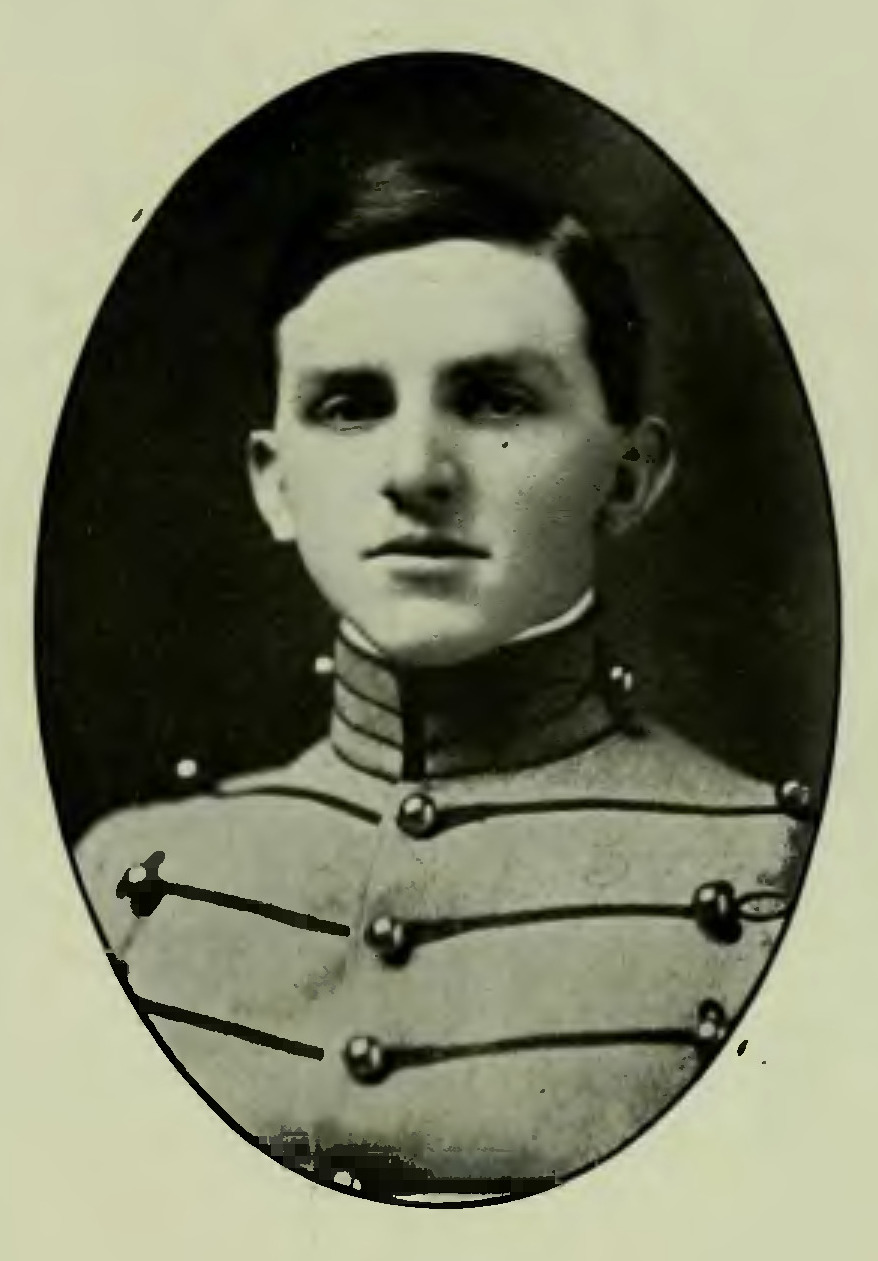
Cole as a college student in 1910

Cole was born in Towson, Maryland, and graduated as a civil engineer from Maryland Agricultural College (now the University of Maryland, College Park) in 1910, receiving a Bachelor of Science in Civil Engineering (B.S.C.E.) degree. He also studied law at the University of Maryland School of Law, was admitted to the bar in 1912, and commenced practice the same year. During World War I, Cole was commissioned as first lieutenant in the United States Army in November 1917. He was assigned to the 316th Regiment of Infantry, 79th Division at Fort Meade, and served overseas. He resumed the practice of law in 1919 in Towson. Cole served as a member of the Board of Regents of the Smithsonian Institution from 1940 to 1943, and was named a member of the Board of Regents of the University of Maryland, College Park in 1931, becoming Chairman of the board in 1944.

== Congressional service ==
In 1926, Cole was elected as a Democrat to the United States House of Representatives, serving one full term in the 70th United States Congress from March 4, 1927, to March 3, 1929. He was an unsuccessful candidate for reelection in 1928, and resumed the practice of law in Towson. He was again elected to the United States House of Representatives in 1930, and this time served from March 4, 1931, until his resignation on October 26, 1942 to accept a judicial post, serving in the 72nd United States Congress and the five succeeding Congresses.

On December 26, 1941, in the absence of Speaker of the House Sam Rayburn, Cole presided with Vice President Henry A. Wallace at the first of Winston Churchill's three addresses to a joint meeting of Congress.

== Federal judicial service ==
Cole was nominated by President Franklin D. Roosevelt on May 11, 1942, to a seat on the United States Customs Court vacated by Judge George Stewart Brown. He was confirmed by the United States Senate on May 11, 1942, and received his commission on May 14, 1942. His service terminated on July 9, 1952, due to his elevation to the United States Court of Customs and Patent Appeals.

Cole was nominated by President Harry S. Truman on July 4, 1952, to an Associate Judge seat on the United States Court of Customs and Patent Appeals vacated by Associate Judge Joseph Raymond Jackson. He was confirmed by the Senate on July 5, 1952, and received his commission on July 7, 1952. His service terminated on September 22, 1957, due to his death.

== Death ==
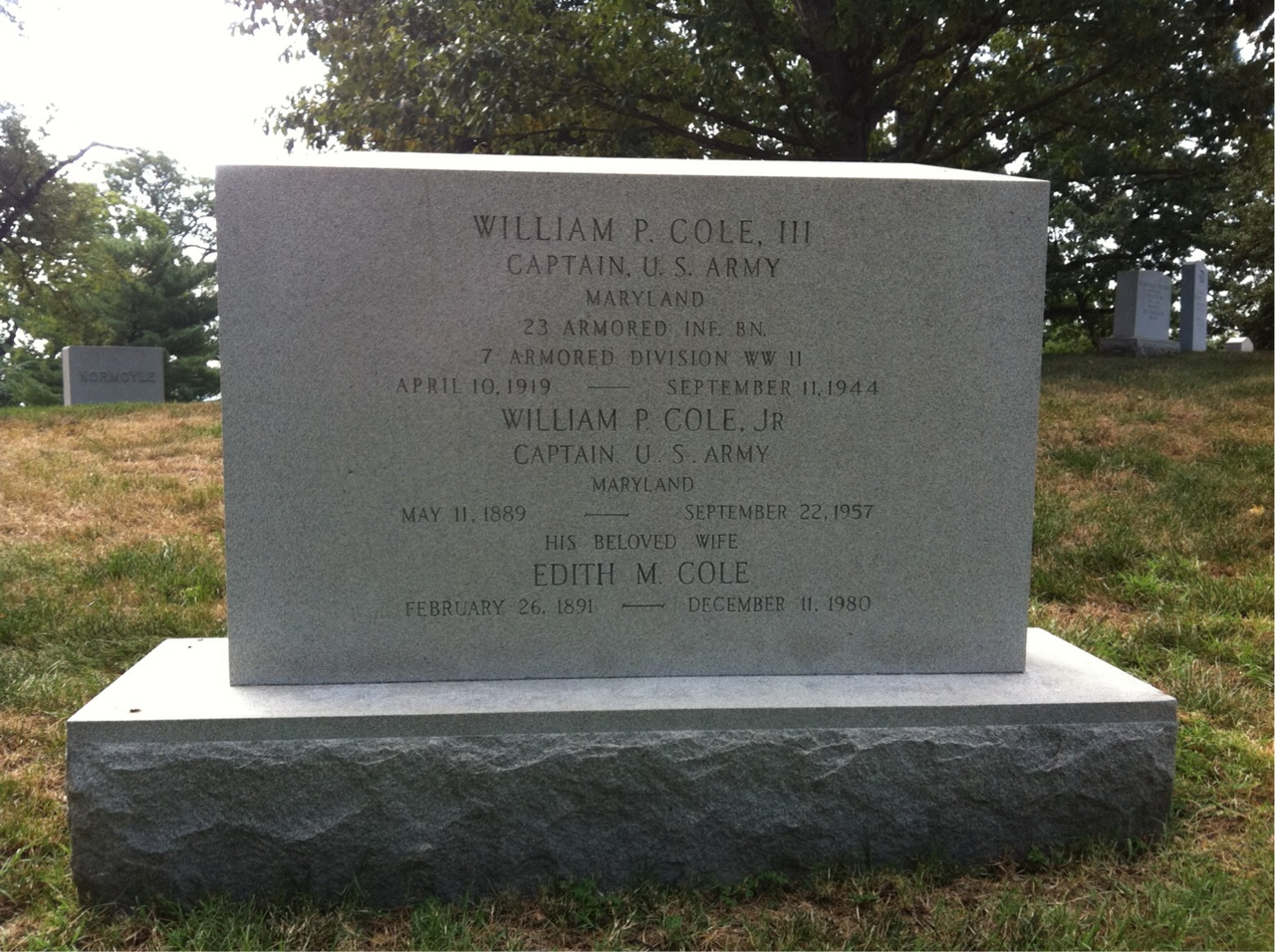
Grave at Arlington National Cemetery

Cole died on September 22, 1957, in Baltimore, Maryland. He is interred in Arlington National Cemetery. Cole Field House at the University of Maryland, College Park is named in his honor.

== Sources ==
- "William Purington Cole Jr". Biographical Directory of the United States Congress.

U.S. House of Representatives
Preceded by Millard Tydings	Member of the United States House of Representatives from Maryland's 2nd congressional district 1927–1929	Succeeded by Linwood Clark
Preceded by Linwood Clark	Member of the United States House of Representatives from Maryland's 2nd congressional district 1931–1942	Succeeded by Harry Streett Baldwin
Legal offices
Preceded by George Stewart Brown	Judge of the United States Customs Court; 1942–1952	Succeeded by David John Wilson
Preceded by Joseph Raymond Jackson	Associate Judge of the United States Court of Customs and Patent Appeals; 1952–1957	Succeeded by Isaac Jack Martin
