= James A. Jewell =

American judge

Member of the Board of General Appraisers
- In office July 17, 1890 – July 15, 1903 (circa); August 12, 1903 (circa)
- Appointed by: Benjamin Harrison
- Preceded by: Seat established by 26 Stat. 131
- Succeeded by: Charles P. McClelland

Personal details
- Born: James A. Jewell; 1840 (circa) Verona, New York, U.S.
- Died: February 3, 1912 (aged 71–72) New York City, New York, U.S.
- Resting place: Woodlawn Cemetery; The Bronx, New York

James A. Jewell (c.1840 – February 3, 1912) was a Member of the Board of General Appraisers.

== Education and career ==
Jewell was born in Verona, New York, c. 1840. He served as a Lieutenant Colonel of the New York Volunteers for the United States Army from 1862 to 1865. He served as Chief of Special Agents in the United States Department of the Treasury in New York City and Boston, Massachusetts from 1885 to 1889 and served as a Special Agent from 1889 to 1890.

== Federal Judicial Service ==
Jewell was nominated by President Benjamin Harrison on July 2, 1890, to the Board of General Appraisers, to a new seat created by 26 Stat. 131. He was confirmed by the United States Senate on July 16, 1890, and received his commission on July 17, 1890. His service terminated circa July 15, 1903, to August 12, 1903, due to his resignation. He was succeeded by Charles P. McClelland.

== Death ==
Jewell died on February 3, 1912, in New York City and is buried at Woodlawn Cemetery in The Bronx, New York.

== Sources ==
- "Board of General Appraisers: Jewell, James A. - Federal Judicial Center". www.fjc.gov.

Legal offices
Preceded by Seat established by 26 Stat. 131	Member of the Board of General Appraisers; 1890–1903	Succeeded by Charles P. McClelland
