= Richard S. Emmet Jr. =

American lawyer and politician

Member of the New York State Assembly
- In office January 1, 1897 – February 7, 1897
- Preceded by: George L. Carlisle
- Succeeded by: William J. Graney

Personal details
- Born: March 10, 1871 New Rochelle, New York, US
- Died: February 7, 1897 (aged 25) Albany, New York, US
- Party: Republican
- Spouse: Mary Lamport Olyphant (m. 1894)
- Relations: Grenville T. Emmet (brother)
- Parent(s): Richard Stockton Emmet; Katherine Temple Emmet
- Education: St. Paul's School
- Alma mater: Rensselaer Polytechnic Institute; Columbia Law School

Richard Stockton Emmet Jr. (March 10, 1871 – February 7, 1897) was an American lawyer and politician from New York.

== Life ==
Coat of Arms of Richard S. Emmet, Sr.

Emmet was born on March 10, 1871, in New Rochelle, New York. He was the son of Richard Stockton Emmet (1821–1902) and Katherine "Kitty" (née Temple) Emmet (1843–1895). Among his brothers were William T. Emmet and diplomat Grenville T. Emmet.

His great-grandfather was New York Attorney General Thomas Addis Emmet. Among his large extended family was first cousins Col. Robert Temple Emmet, Rosina Emmet Sherwood (mother of playwright Robert E. Sherwood), William LeRoy Emmet, Devereux Emmet, Lydia Field Emmet, Jane Emmet de Glehn (wife of Wilfrid de Glehn), Christopher Temple Emmet (husband of Alida Beekman Chanler, daughter of John Winthrop Chanler).

He attended St. Paul's School in Concord, New Hampshire, Rensselaer Polytechnic Institute and Columbia Law School.

== Career ==
After his graduation from law school, he studied law with his brother-in-law New York Supreme Court Justice Martin J. Keogh (the husband of his sister Katherine Temple Emmet) he was admitted to the bar, and practiced with Emmet & Robinson, the law office of his father.

Emmet entered politics as a Republican. He was a member of the New York State Assembly, representing the second district (Westchester County), in 1897. In the Assembly, he was appointed to the Judiciary and Trades and Manufactures Committees by Speaker O'Grady, served briefly until his death in February 1897.

== Personal life ==
On June 6, 1894, he married Mary Lamport Olyphant, the only daughter of Mary (née Lamport) Olyphant and Harwood Vernon Olyphant. Together, they were the parents of one child: Mary Olyphant Emmet (born 1895).

He died of typhoid fever during the legislative session, at his lodgings in Albany, New York, on February 7, 1897. After his death, his widow remarried to Harvard graduate and banker, Philip Curtis in 1899.

New York State Assembly
Preceded by George L. Carlisle	New York State Assembly; Westchester County, 2nd District; 1897	Succeeded by William J. Graney
