= Thomas C. O'Sullivan =

American politician

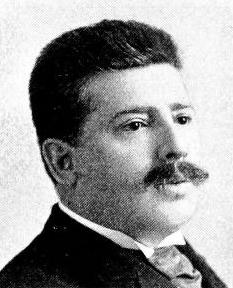
Thomas C. O'Sullivan (1893)

Thomas C. O'Sullivan (c. 1858 Michigan – July 29, 1913 Spring Lake, Monmouth County, New Jersey) was an American lawyer and politician from New York.

== Life ==
He was educated in Vermont, and then taught school. He was Principal of the high school in Burlington, and worked during the summer vacations in a factory. There "he suffered an accident which cost him an arm." Then he taught English, French and Latin at Wadham's Academy in Ogdensburg, New York, and later at St. Joseph's College in Burlington.

In 1887, he moved to New York City, entered the Tammany Hall organization, and became Chief Recording Clerk in the County Clerk's office. He began to study law at Columbia Law School, and was among those who left in 1890, and enrolled in the first class at New York Law School in 1891. He was class president in 1892, and disagreed with the Dean, Prof. George Chase, about William McAdoo's fitness to address the graduating class. Due to the dispute, Chase refused to countersign O'Sullivan's diploma, but Chase was compelled by order of the New York Supreme Court to do so. O'Sullivan was admitted to the bar in 1892, and practiced law in New York City.

He was a member of the New York State Assembly (New York Co., 19th D.) in 1893; and of the New York State Senate (12th D.) in 1894 and 1895.

He was a Judge of the Court of General Sessions of New York City from 1906 until his death. For his work in religious and charitable organizations, he was made a Knight of St. Gregory by Pope Pius X in 1908.

In 1907, he suffered "from an attack of pneumonia," which "affected his sight, and finally necessitated an operation for the removal of an eye." He died on July 29, 1913, at his summer home in Spring Lake, New Jersey.

== Sources ==
- The New York Red Book compiled by Edgar L. Murlin (published by James B. Lyon, Albany NY, 1897; pg. 404 and 510)
- Sketches of the members of the Legislature in The Evening Journal Almanac (1895; pg. 49) [gives birth year 1858]
- MR. O'SULLIVAN'S DIPLOMA in NYT on July 30, 1892
- O'SULLIVAN DIES BLESSED BY POPE in NYT on July 29, 1913 [gives birth year 1857]

New York State Assembly
Preceded by John Connelly	New York State Assembly; New York County, 19th District; 1893	Succeeded by Patrick J. Kerrigan
New York State Senate
Preceded by Charles P. McClelland	New York State Senate; 12th District; 1894–1895	Succeeded by Samuel J. Foley
