= Joseph Lewis Stackpole =

American judge

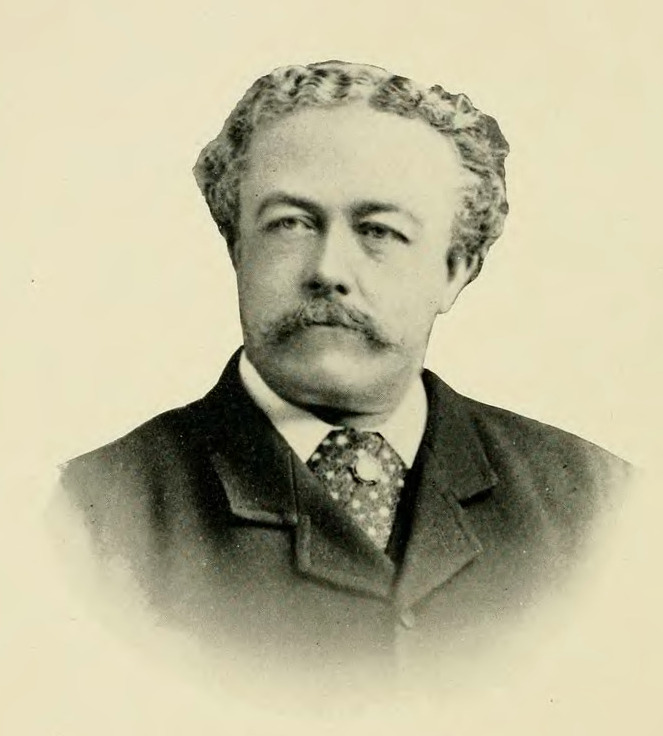

Member of the Board of General Appraisers
- In office July 22, 1890 – December 5, 1890
- Appointed by: Benjamin Harrison
- Preceded by: Seat established by 26 Stat. 131
- Succeeded by: Wilbur Fisk Lunt

Personal details
- Born: Joseph Lewis Stackpole; March 20, 1838 Boston, Massachusetts
- Died: January 2, 1904 (aged 65) Boston, Massachusetts
- Education: Harvard University (B.A.); Harvard Law School (LL.B.)

Joseph Lewis Stackpole (March 20, 1838 – January 2, 1904) was a Member of the Board of General Appraisers.

== Education and career ==
Stackpole was born on March 20, 1838, in Boston, Massachusetts. He received a Bachelor of Arts degree in 1857 from Harvard University. He received a Bachelor of Laws in 1859 from Harvard Law School. He worked in private practice in Boston from 1860 to 1861, 1865 to 1870 and 1876 to 1890. He served as a Lieutenant Colonel and judge advocate in the United States Army from 1861 to 1865. He served as City Solicitor for Boston from 1870 to 1876.

== Federal judicial service ==
Stackpole was nominated by President Benjamin Harrison on July 17, 1890, to the Board of General Appraisers, to a new seat created by 26 Stat. 131. He was confirmed by the United States Senate on July 18, 1890, and received his commission on July 22, 1890. His service terminated on December 5, 1890, due to his resignation. He was succeeded by Wilbur Fisk Lunt.

== Death ==
Stackpole died on January 2, 1904, in Boston.

== Sources ==
- "Board of General Appraisers: Stackpole, Joseph Lewis - Federal Judicial Center". www.fjc.gov.

Legal offices
Preceded by Seat established by 26 Stat. 131	Member of the Board of General Appraisers; 1890	Succeeded by Wilbur Fisk Lunt
