= George Stewart Brown =

American judge

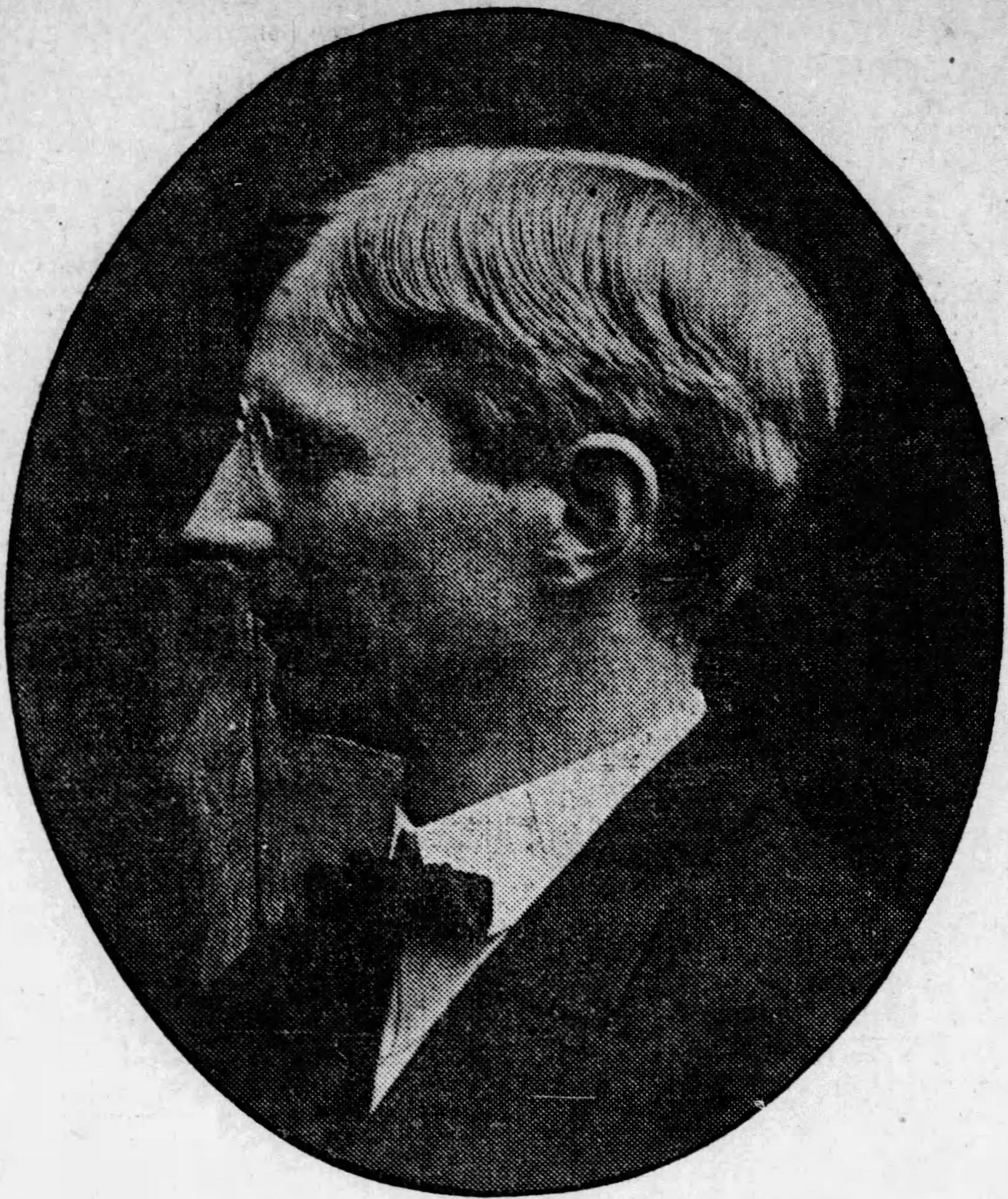

Presiding Judge of the United States Customs Court
- In office 1939–1940
- Preceded by: Charles P. McClelland
- Succeeded by: Webster Oliver

Judge of the United States Customs Court
- In office May 28, 1926 – August 31, 1941
- Appointed by: operation of law
- Preceded by: Seat established by 44 Stat. 669
- Succeeded by: William Purington Cole Jr.

Member of the Board of General Appraisers
- In office November 14, 1913 – May 28, 1926
- Appointed by: Woodrow Wilson
- Preceded by: Roy Chamberlain
- Succeeded by: Seat abolished

Personal details
- Born: George Stewart Brown; August 16, 1871 Baltimore, Maryland, U.S.
- Died: November 11, 1941 (aged 70) Baltimore, Maryland, U.S.
- Education: Johns Hopkins University (A.B.); University of Maryland School of Law (LL.B.)

George Stewart Brown (August 16, 1871 – November 11, 1941) was a judge of the United States Customs Court and a member of the Board of General Appraisers.

== Education and career ==
Born on August 16, 1871, in Baltimore, Maryland, Brown received an Artium Baccalaureus degree in 1893 from Johns Hopkins University. He received a Bachelor of Laws in 1895 from the University of Maryland School of Law. He worked in private practice in Baltimore from 1895 to 1913. He served as a member of the Baltimore City Council from 1899 to 1907.

== Federal Judicial Service ==
Brown was nominated by President Woodrow Wilson on October 16, 1913, to a seat on the Board of General Appraisers vacated by Roy Chamberlain. He was confirmed by the United States Senate on November 13, 1913, and received his commission on November 14, 1913. Brown was reassigned by operation of law to the United States Customs Court on May 28, 1926, to a new Associate Justice seat (Judge seat from June 17, 1930) authorized by 44 Stat. 669. He served as Presiding Judge from 1939 to 1940. His service terminated on August 31, 1941, due to his retirement. He was succeeded by Judge William Purington Cole Jr.

== Death ==
Brown died on November 11, 1941, in Baltimore.

== Sources ==
Legal offices
Preceded by Roy Chamberlain	Member of the Board of General Appraisers; 1913–1926	Succeeded by Seat abolished
Preceded by Seat established by 44 Stat. 669	Judge of the United States Customs Court; 1926–1941	Succeeded by William Purington Cole Jr.
Preceded by Charles P. McClelland	Presiding Judge of the United States Customs Court; 1939–1940	Succeeded by Webster Oliver
