= Thomas K. Fraser =

American politician

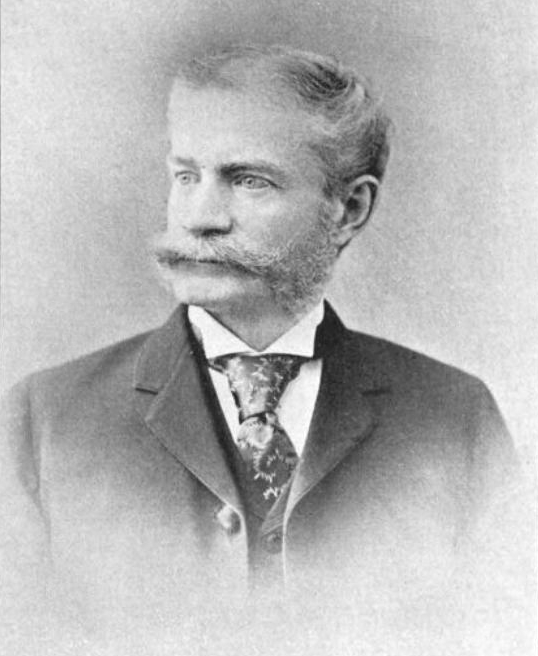

Member of the New York State Assembly
- In office 1892–1893
- Constituency: Westchester County 1st District

Personal details
- Born: Thomas Kevan Fraser; February 23, 1844 New York, New York, US
- Died: March 16, 1904 (aged 60) New York, New York, US
- Resting place: New York City Marble Cemetery
- Party: Democratic
- Occupation: Businessman, politician

Thomas Kevan Fraser (February 23, 1844 – March 16, 1904) was an American leather businessman and politician from New York.

== Life ==
Fraser was born on February 23, 1844, in New York City, of Scotch-American parentage. His parents were Thomas Fraser and Jane Kevan. The family moved to Hastings-on-Hudson in 1851.

Fraser worked in the hide and leather business. He was first elected to the school board in 1885, and served as its president in 1892. He held various offices in Hastings-on-Hudson, including president of the village for seven consecutive years. He was president of the Far and Near Tennis Club and the United States National Lawn Tennis Association as well as a member of the Saint Andrew's Society of the State of New York.

In 1891, Fraser was elected to the New York State Assembly as a Democrat, representing the Westchester County 1st District. He served in the Assembly in 1892 and 1893.

Fraser died from pneumonia at his home in Manhattan on March 16, 1904. He was buried in New York City Marble Cemetery.

New York State Assembly
Preceded by Charles P. McClelland	New York State Assembly; Westchester County, 1st District; 1892–1893	Succeeded by John C. Harrigan
