= William McKennan =

American judge (1816–1893)

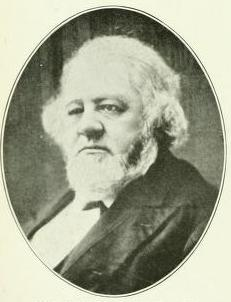

Judge of the United States Circuit Courts for the Third Circuit
- In office December 22, 1869 – January 3, 1891
- Appointed by: Ulysses S. Grant
- Preceded by: Seat established by 16 Stat. 44
- Succeeded by: Marcus W. Acheson

Personal details
- Born: William McKennan; September 27, 1816 Washington, Pennsylvania
- Died: October 27, 1893 (aged 77) Pittsburgh, Pennsylvania
- Education: Yale University; Washington & Jefferson College read law

William McKennan (September 27, 1816 – October 27, 1893) was a United States circuit judge of the United States Circuit Courts for the Third Circuit.

== Education and career ==
Born in Washington, Pennsylvania, McKennan attended Yale University and graduated from Washington College in Washington, Pennsylvania (now Washington & Jefferson College) in 1833, before reading law to enter the bar in 1837. He was in private practice in Washington from 1837 to 1852. He was a deputy state attorney general of Pennsylvania from 1837 to 1839. He was a Burgess of Washington, Pennsylvania in 1847.

== Federal judicial service ==
On December 8, 1869, McKennan was nominated by President Ulysses S. Grant to a new seat on the United States Circuit Courts for the Third Circuit created by 16 Stat. 44. He was confirmed by the United States Senate on December 22, 1869, and received his commission the same day. McKennan served in that capacity until his retirement from the bench on January 3, 1891.

== Death ==
McKennan died on October 27, 1893, in Pittsburgh, Pennsylvania.

== Sources ==
Legal offices
Preceded by Seat established by 16 Stat. 44	Judge of the United States Circuit Courts for the Third Circuit; 1869–1891	Succeeded by Marcus W. Acheson
