= Howard R. Bayne =

American lawyer, politician, and historian

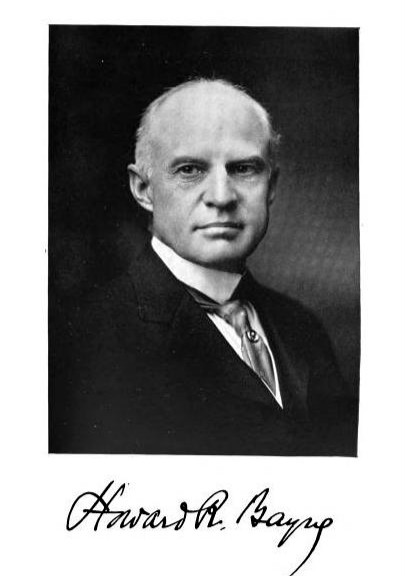
- Born: Howard Randolph Bayne; May 11, 1851; Winchester, Virginia
- Died: March 13, 1933 (aged 81); New Brighton, Staten Island
- Occupations: Politician, Attorney, Historian

Howard Randolph Bayne (May 11, 1851 in Winchester, Frederick County, Virginia – March 13, 1933 in New Brighton, Staten Island, New York City) was an American lawyer, historian and politician from New York.

== Life ==
Bayne was born in 1851 in Winchester, Virginia. He began his education at the Squire's School in Richmond, Virginia from which he matriculated to Richmond College (now the University of Richmond) and law at the University of Virginia. Early in his career he taught at the University School in Richmond and Pampatike Academy in King William County. In 1879 he was admitted to the bar and formed a partnership with James Ashton Cabell, Cabell & Bayne. Bayne dissolved the firm in 1882 when he moved to Staten Island.

Bayne married in 1886 in Richmond, Virginia, to Elizabeth S. Moore, of Texas. The couple had two sons and one daughter. Bayne and his wife resided in the New Brighton area of Staten Island. Their former home is now owned by writer Darwin Porter and partner Danforth Price.

In February 1896, he ran as an Independent Democrat for Supervisor of the Town of Castleton, but was defeated by the regular Democratic candidate. Later that year he joined the Gold Democrats.

Bayne was a member of the New York State Senate (23rd D.) from 1909 to 1912, sitting in the 132nd, 133rd, 134th and 135th New York State Legislatures. He was Chairman of the Committee on the Judiciary, and Chairman of the Senate Committee to investigate the city and county of Albany. He also served as member of senate committees on villages, agriculture, internal affairs of towns and counties, privileges and elections; forest, fish and game; commerce and navigation, and codes.

He died on March 13, 1933, at his home at 75 St. Mark's Place in New Brighton, Staten Island.

== Writings ==
Bayne was an avid writer throughout his life writing a number of news articles and books focusing on colonial, military and legal history and well as regional impressions. He wrote for the Richmond Times Dispatch under the pseudonym 'Ego and Alter' and also for the Railroad Gazette and the Society of Colonial Wars. Some of his works are;

- Addresses During the Final Exercises, June 7–11, 1914
- The Application of the Monroe Doctrine
- A rebellion in the Colony of Virginia
- The Buckners of Virginia and the Allied Families of Strother and Ashby
- George Washington, His Administration as President
- The Settlement of Jamestown
- The Year 1619 in the Colony of Virginia

== Societies and Organizations ==
Bayne was a member of the Greek letter society, Beta Theta Phi, the Colonnade Club of the University of Virginia, Richmond County Country Club, New York City Bar Association, New York State Bar Association, Society of Cincinnati, Society of Colonial Wars, Sons of the Revolution, Virginia Historical Society. The Virginians of New York, New York Southern Society, Staten Island Association of Arts and Sciences, Reform Club of New York City, Fort Orange Club, the Prohibition Commission of the State of New York and New York State Employers' Liability Commission.

== Ancestry ==
Bayne was a descendant of William Thornton (immigrant) and distant cousin of U.S. Presidents James Madison and Zachary Taylor as well as explorer Meriwether Lewis.

Ancestors of Howard R. Bayne

16. Matthew Bayne
8. Matthew Bayne
17. Eleanor Quisenberry
4. Richard Bayne
9. Catherine Harrison
2. Charles Bayne
20. John Pope
10. Lawrence Pope
21. Sarah Mothershead
5. Susan Pope
22. Nicholas Quisenberry
11. Penelope Quisenberry
23. Hannah
1. Howard Randolph Bayne
24. Robert Ashby
12. John Ashby
25. Mary Elizabeth Farrow
6. Thomson Ashby
26. Samuel Turner
13. Mary Elizabeth Turner
27. Verlinda McPherson
3. Mary Ellen Ashby
28. John Menefee
14. William Menefee
29. Mildred Johnston
7. Anne Stuart Menefee
30. Joseph Strother
15. Mary Wade Strother
31. Nancy Anne Stuart

== Footnotes ==
New York State Senate
Preceded by Francis M. Carpenter	New York State Senate; 23rd District; 1909–1912	Succeeded by George A. Blauvelt
