= William T. Emmet =

American lawyer

Personal details
- Born: July 28, 1869 New Rochelle, New York, US
- Died: February 4, 1918 (aged 48) New York, US
- Spouse: Cornelia Booream Zabriskie (m. 1896)
- Relations: Grenville T. Emmet (brother)
- Parent(s): Richard Stockton Emmet; Katherine Temple Emmet
- Education: St. Paul's School
- Alma mater: Columbia Law School; Columbia College

William Temple Emmet (July 28, 1869 – February 4, 1918) was an American lawyer from New York.

== Life ==
Emmet was born on July 28, 1869, in New Rochelle, New York, the son of lawyer Richard Stockton Emmet and Katharine Temple. His brothers included assemblyman Richard S. Emmet Jr. and lawyer Grenville T. Emmet. He was the great-grandson of Thomas Addis Emmet, a leader of the Society of United Irishmen that immigrated to America, where he worked as a lawyer in New York City and served as Attorney General of New York.

Emmet attended St. Paul's School in Concord, New Hampshire, and Columbia College. He studied law in the law office of Judge Martin K. Keogh and spent a year in Columbia Law School. He graduated from there in 1891 and was admitted to the bar in 1892. He initially practiced law in his native county, but in 1894 he formed a partnership in New York City. Almost immediately after his 21st birthday, he was elected Trustee of New Rochelle, serving in that position from 1891 to 1894. He was a delegate to the 1894 New York State Constitutional Convention. In 1900, Mayor Van Wyck appointed him to the New York City Board of Education. He was a delegate to the 1904 and 1912 Democratic National Conventions.

Emmet was counsel to the New York to the New York Life Insurance and Trust Company. He was an active member of the Democratic Party and was an organizer of the Democratic League. In 1912, he was appointed Superintendent of the New York State Insurance Department. In 1914, he was appointed to the Public Service Commissioner. By then, he resided in South Salem.

Emmet was a member of the New York City Bar Association since 1891. He was also a member of the New York County Lawyers' Association, the Metropolitan Club, and the Players Club. He attended the Episcopal Church. In 1896, he married Cornelia Booream Zabriskie. Their children were Katharine Temple, Richard Stockton, and William Temple.

Emmet died at his home in New York City from angina pectoris on February 4, 1918. He was buried in Beechwoods Cemetery in New Rochelle.
