= Charles P. McClelland =

American politician

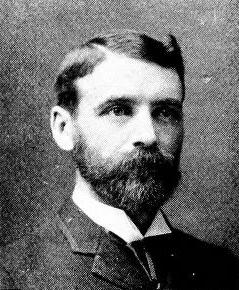

Presiding Judge of the United States Customs Court
- In office 1934–1939
- Preceded by: William Josiah Tilson
- Succeeded by: George Stewart Brown

Judge of the United States Customs Court
- In office May 28, 1926 – September 30, 1939
- Appointed by: operation of law
- Preceded by: Seat established by 44 Stat. 669
- Succeeded by: Webster Oliver

Member of the Board of General Appraisers
- In office August 21, 1903 – May 28, 1926
- Appointed by: Theodore Roosevelt
- Preceded by: James A. Jewell
- Succeeded by: Seat abolished

Member of the New York Senate from the 21st district
- In office January 1, 1903 – August 21, 1903
- Preceded by: Joseph P. Hennessy
- Succeeded by: John A. Hawkins

Member of the New York Senate from the 12th district
- In office January 1, 1892 – December 31, 1893
- Preceded by: William H. Robertson
- Succeeded by: Thomas C. O'Sullivan

Member of the New York State Assembly from the Westchester County, 1st district
- In office January 1, 1891 – December 31, 1891
- Preceded by: J. Irving Burns
- Succeeded by: Thomas K. Fraser

Member of the New York State Assembly from the Westchester County, 1st district
- In office January 1, 1885 – December 31, 1886
- Preceded by: Norton P. Otis
- Succeeded by: J. Irving Burns

Personal details
- Born: Charles Paul McClelland; December 19, 1854 Glenluce, Scotland
- Died: June 6, 1944 (aged 89) Dobbs Ferry, New York, U.S.
- Education: New York University School of Law (LL.B.)

Charles Paul McClelland (December 19, 1854 – June 6, 1944) was a judge of the United States Customs Court and previously was a Member of the Board of General Appraisers.

== Education and career ==
Born on December 19, 1854, in Glenluce, Scotland, McClelland received a Bachelor of Laws from New York University School of Law in 1880. He was admitted to the bar the same year, and practiced law in Dobbs Ferry, New York. He was a member of the New York State Assembly (Westchester Co, 1st D.) in 1885 and 1886. He was deputy Collector of the Port of New York from December 1886 to March 1890. He was again a member of the State Assembly in 1891. He was a member of the New York State Senate (12th D.) in 1892, 1893 and 1903.

== Federal judicial service ==
McClelland received a recess appointment from President Theodore Roosevelt on August 21, 1903, to a seat on the Board of General Appraisers vacated by Member James A. Jewell. He was nominated to the same position by President Roosevelt on November 10, 1903. He was confirmed by the United States Senate on December 7, 1903, and received his commission on December 8, 1903. McClelland was reassigned by operation of law to the United States Customs Court on May 28, 1926, to a new Associate Justice (Judge from June 17, 1930) seat authorized by 44 Stat. 669. He served as Presiding Judge from 1934 to 1939. His service terminated on September 30, 1939, due to his retirement. He was succeeded by Judge Webster Oliver.

== Death ==
McClelland died on June 6, 1944, in Dobbs Ferry.

New York State Assembly
Preceded by Norton P. Otis	New York State Assembly Westchester County, 1st District; 1885–1886	Succeeded by J. Irving Burns
Preceded by J. Irving Burns	New York State Assembly Westchester County, 1st District; 1891	Succeeded by Thomas K. Fraser
New York State Senate
Preceded by William H. Robertson	New York State Senate 12th District; 1892–1893	Succeeded by Thomas C. O'Sullivan
Preceded by Joseph P. Hennessy	New York State Senate 21st District; 1903	Succeeded by John A. Hawkins
Legal offices
Preceded by James A. Jewell	Member of the Board of General Appraisers; 1903–1926	Succeeded by Seat abolished
Preceded by Seat established by 44 Stat. 669	Judge of the United States Customs Court; 1926–1939	Succeeded by Webster Oliver
Preceded by William Josiah Tilson	Presiding Judge of the United States Customs Court; 1934–1939	Succeeded by George Stewart Brown
