= Sells =

Sells may refer to:

== People ==
- Cato Sells (1859–1948), American politician
- Charles Harvey Sells (1889–1978), American politician
- Chris Sells (born 1963), American politician
- Dan Gillespie Sells (born 1978), British singer-songwriter
- Dave Sells (born 1946), American baseball player
- David Sells Hurwood (1924–2005), British doctor
- Elijah Sells (1814–1897), American military officer, politician and businessman
- Elijah Watt Sells (1858-1924), American accountant
- Hugh Sells (1922–1978), English cricket player and Royal Air Force officer
- Katherine Gillespie Sells, British campaigner
- Lewis Sells (1841–1907), American circus proprietor
- Michael Sells (born 1949), American historian and scholar of religion
- Mike Sells (born 1945), American politician
- Peter Sells (1845–1904), American circus proprietor
- Sam R. Sells (1871–1935), American politician
- Tommy Lynn Sells (1964–2014), American serial killer
- Willie Sells (1866–1908), American circus proprietor
- William Sells (1881–1966), British navy officer

== Places ==
- Sells, Arizona, United States
- Sells Park, Ohio, United States

== Other ==
- Sells Brothers Circus
- Sells Engineering, from United States v. Sells Engineering, Inc.
- Sells Floto Circus
- Sells Ltd, advertising agency
