= Victorian Village =

- Neighborhood of Columbus
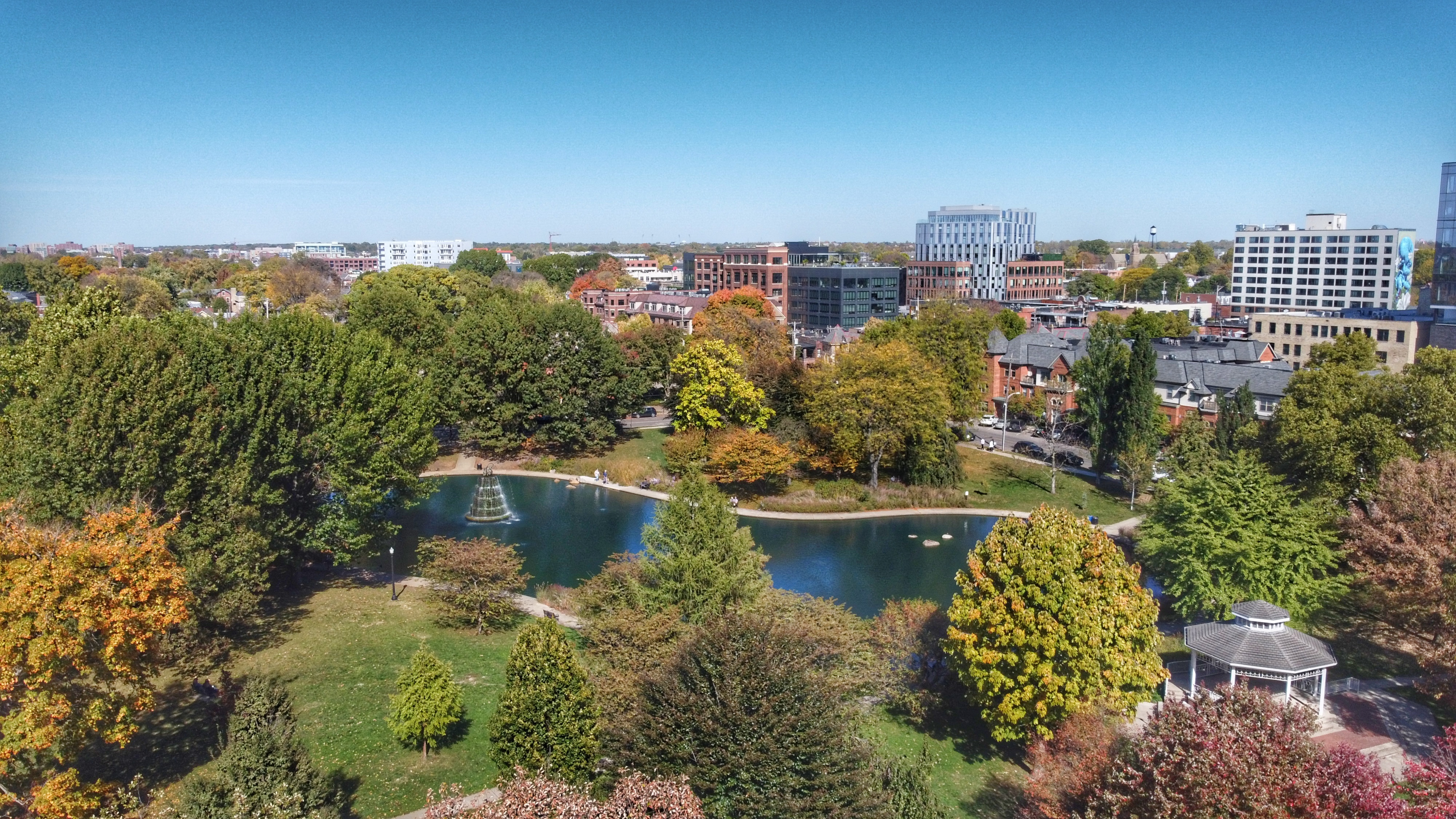
- Goodale Park, the focal point of Victorian Village
- Interactive map of the neighborhood
- Coordinates: 39°59′N 83°01′W
- Country: United States
- State: Ohio
- County: Franklin
- City: Columbus
- ZIP Code: 43201 and 43215
- Area code: 614

Victorian Village is a neighborhood in Columbus, Ohio, United States, north and near west of downtown. It is an established neighborhood built when a streetcar line first ran along Neil Avenue around 1900 with a fair number of established trees for an urban setting. To preserve, protect and enhance the unique architectural and historical features, the Victorian Village Historic District was established in 1973. Columbus Monthly named this neighborhood the top place to live for Arts and Entertainment, with fun right around the corner in the Short North as its neighborhood hangout.

== History ==
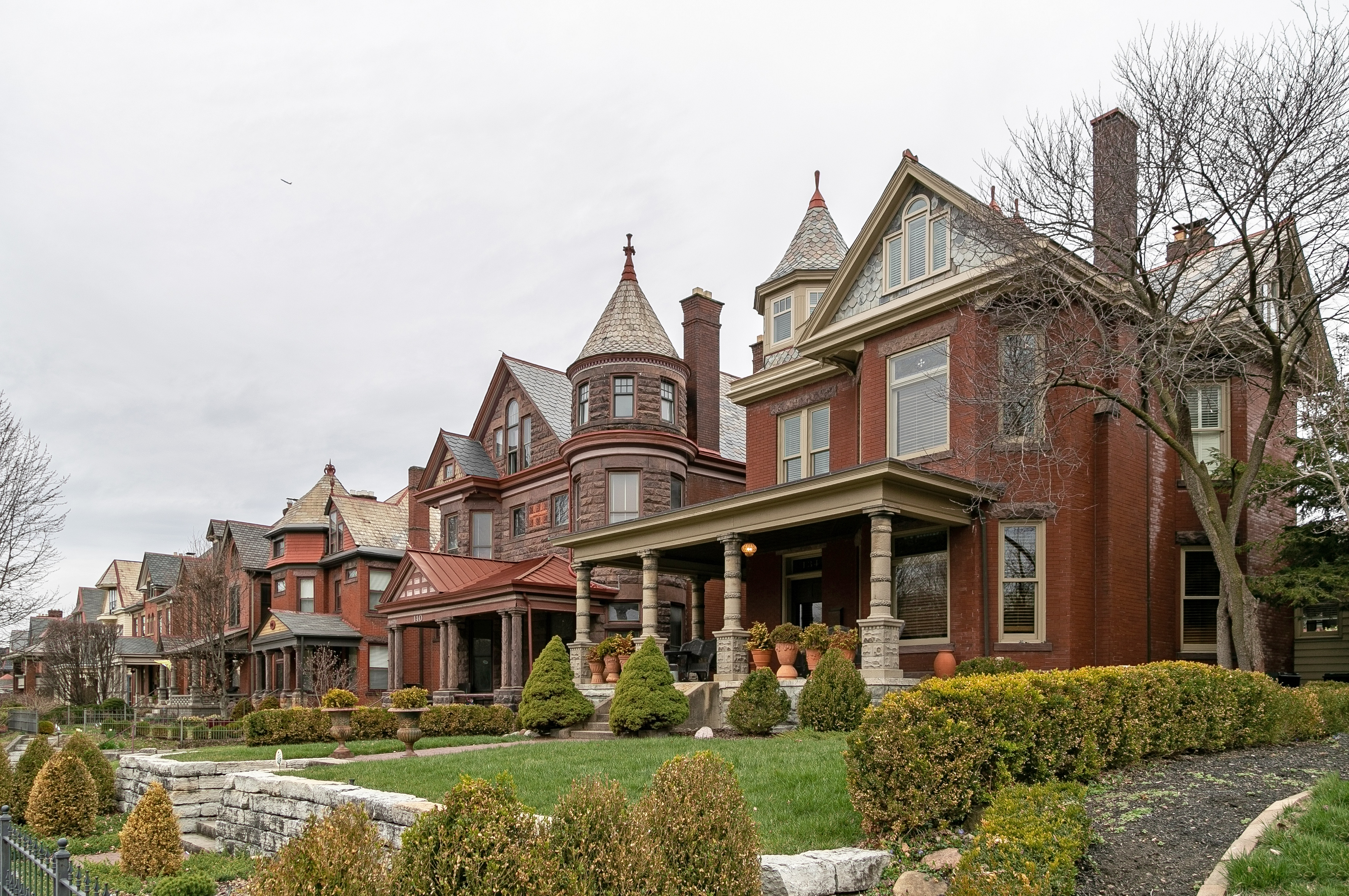
Victorian houses facing Goodale Park

In 1827, Columbus businessman William "Billy" Neil purchased 300 acres of farmland just north of Downtown Columbus from Joseph Vance, and by 1853 owned all of the land from west of North High Street to the Olentangy River, south to First Avenue, and north to Lane Avenue. He constructed a road on the property to reach his farm, which became known as Neil Avenue. After Neil's death, the land was subdivided by his heirs. Southern portions of the Neil Farm were developed and became one of Columbus's first suburbs, Victorian Village.

Development of land south of the Neil Farm was spurred by the growth in manufacturing in the Olentangy Industrial Cluster, placement of Goodale Park, the city's first public park, and streetcar service along Neil Avenue and High Streets. Streetcar lines expanded in 1879 down Neil Avenue, which connected downtown Columbus and The Ohio State University. Because of the streetcar, Neil Avenue became a major north-south route. The Neil Farm, west of current-day Neil Avenue and south of West Fifth Avenue, was platted between 1888 and 1902. Lots were reserved, almost exclusively for large homes. Electric Streetcar Service along High Street in 1888, followed by Neil Avenue in 1891, further increased the demand for housing between The Ohio State University and downtown Columbus. By 1920, the majority of these parcels had filled in with Victorian, Italianate Queen Anne, Second Empire, Carpenter-Stick, and Four Square style homes.

Following 1920, the streetcar gave way to the automobile as the main source of transportation. Increased mobility allowed residents to move further away and into the suburbs of Columbus. As that occurred, businesses also began moving to the suburbs to be closer to their customers, which led to a decline in the neighborhood. The nearby Flytown, Short North, and Italian Village neighborhoods suffered a similar decline.

Renewed interest in Victorian Village was sparked in the 1970s, following the successes of German Village, which had undergone a significant revival in the 1960s. Restoration begun in Victorian Village was carried out under the auspices of the Victorian Village Commission, which was established as a historic district by the City of Columbus in 1973. In 1980, it was listed on the list of National Historic Places and is in the Near North Side Historic District.

== Geography ==
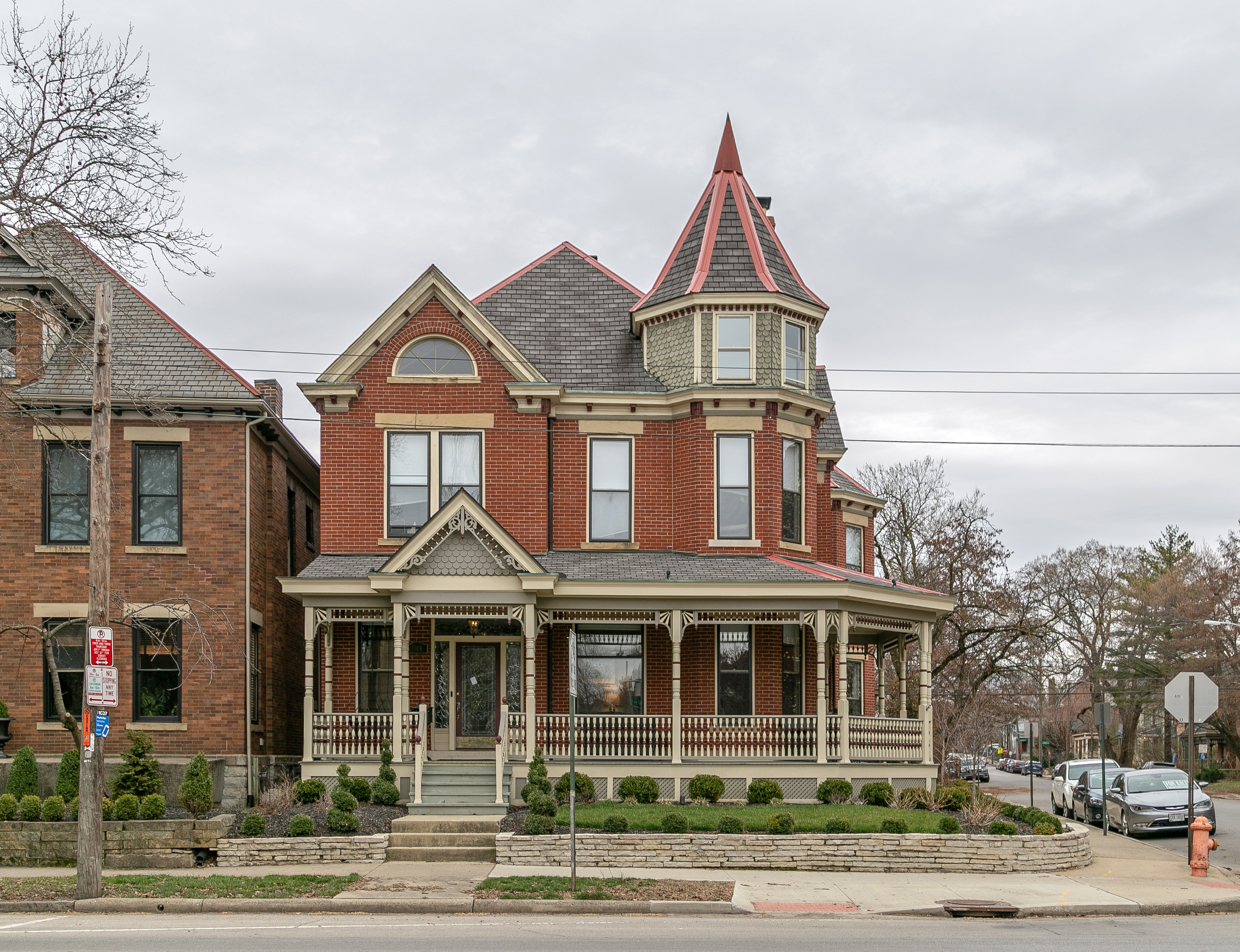
A house on Neil Avenue

Victorian Village is a neighborhood located north and near west of Downtown. It is just north of the Arena District and to the East is the Italian Village. Its southern boundary, Goodale Avenue, is a block away from North Market and the Columbus Convention Center and its northern boundary, West Fifth Avenue, is half a mile away from Ohio State University. It is an older area with a fair number of established trees for an urban setting. Neil Avenue is the main thoroughfare through Victorian Village, a street that eventually crosses through the campus of the Ohio State University. It shares its High Street boundary with the Short North neighborhood to its east. Harrison Avenue forms its western boundary.

== Structure and landmarks ==
=== Neil Avenue United Methodist Church ===
Built between 1890 and 1914, the Neil Avenue United Methodist Church was first designed by Yost & Packard in 1890 but later completed by Stribling and Lum in 1914. In 1996 it became the home to the Ethiopian Orthodox Tewahedo Church.

=== Goodale Park ===
Often referred to as the hub of Victorian Village, Goodale Park is a 32-acre (13 ha) park at the southern tip of Victorian Village. Goodale Park is bounded by Buttles Avenue and Goodale Street to the north and south, and Dennison Avenue and Park Street on its west and east sides. As Columbus's oldest planned park, it was established after land was gifted to the city by Lincoln Goodale in 1851. During the United States Civil War, the park was used to recruit Union soldiers in the spring and summer of 1861. In 1862 the park was improved. A fountain was built in the southwest corner and East Lake was under construction. Later in 1877, the park became home to two bears, three fox, nineteen rabbits, and two wolves, all of which were moved to a barred building for visitors to spectate. The lakes were reconstructed after the Great Depression with the funds from President Roosevelt's Works Progress Administration. In 1951 the park celebrated its centennial with nearly 300 spectators. Today, Goodale Park is known as the host for ComFest, a major annual festival.

=== Circus House ===
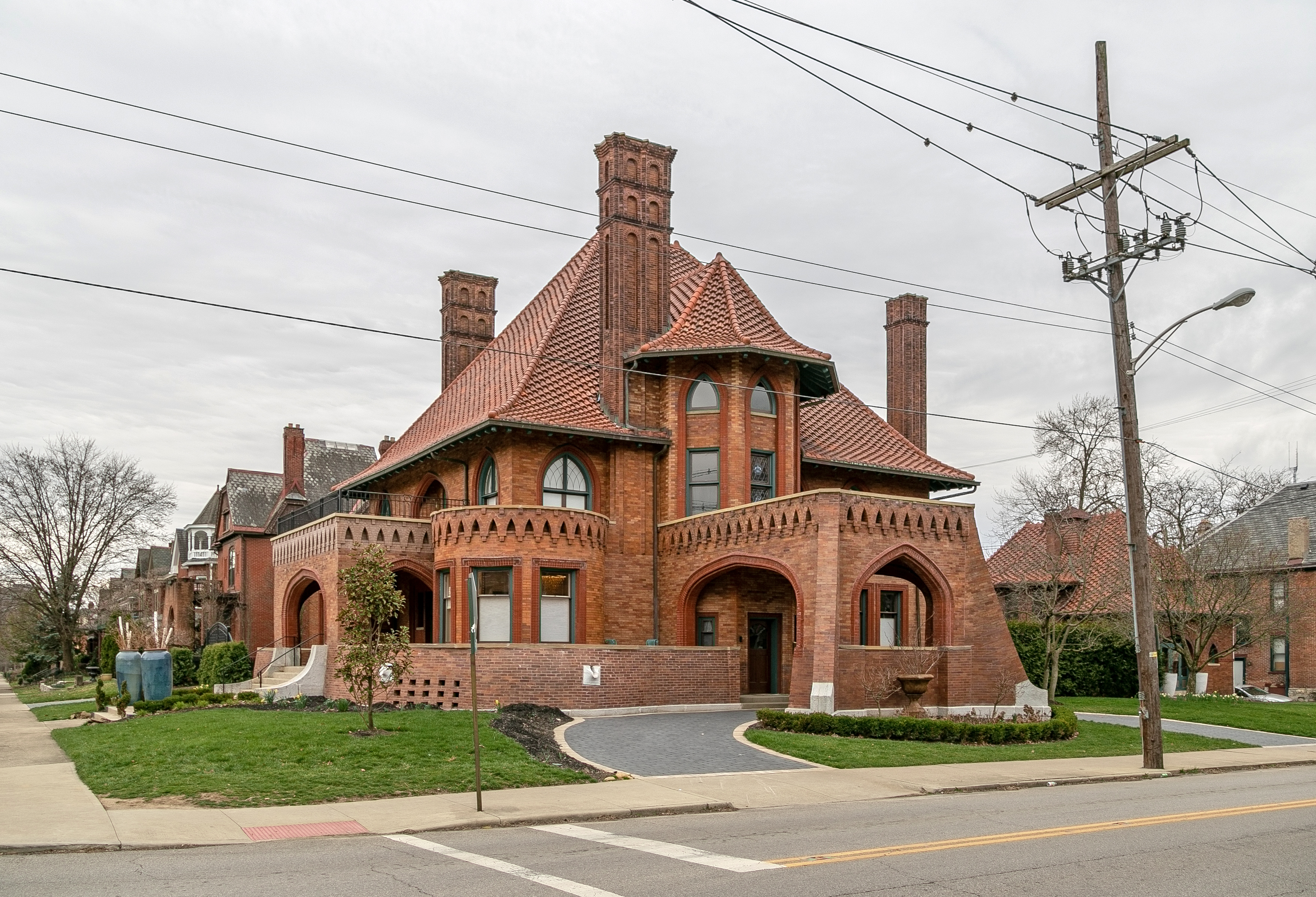
The Circus House

Built in 1895 by the circus magnate Peter Sells (of Sells Brothers Circus), architect Frank Packard designed this Romanesque house with influence from the Sells family trip to California in 1891. The dramatic rooflines, curved Moorish style windows, and terracotta-tile roof suggest a similar profile to that of a circus big top. Packard also designed the carriage house, occupied by the servants of the Sells family. Once settled in the new residence, the Sells' furnished the house with pieces from their travels around the world, creating a lavish and exotic feel to the interior. The Sells family occupied the house until 1899 when Peter and his wife Mary divorced due to Mary's alleged infidelity. The ensuing divorce trial was front-page news, as Columbusites became fascinated with the scandalous circumstances the divorce was filed upon. Peter Sells gained the split from his wife in December 1900 and removed her from his home. Since Peter's death in 1904, the usage of the Sells Brothers house has varied greatly, ranging from a nursery school to a shelter house for recovering alcoholics. The home is now privately owned.

=== 41 West Third Avenue ===
Built-in 1870, Henry Howe wrote the Historical Collections of Ohio in this home in 1889. In 1910, the home was bought and extensively renovated by Dr. Clovis Taylor, who built an addition centered on the usage of mahogany woodwork. The addition included a bar, parlor, enlarged entrance hall, and iconic wraparound porch. After its usage as a funeral home through the 1950s, the house underwent another renovation in the 1970s. Owner Larry Schwartzenberger restored the 14-foot bar and added a 1920-era soda fountain.

=== Saint Francis of Assisi ===
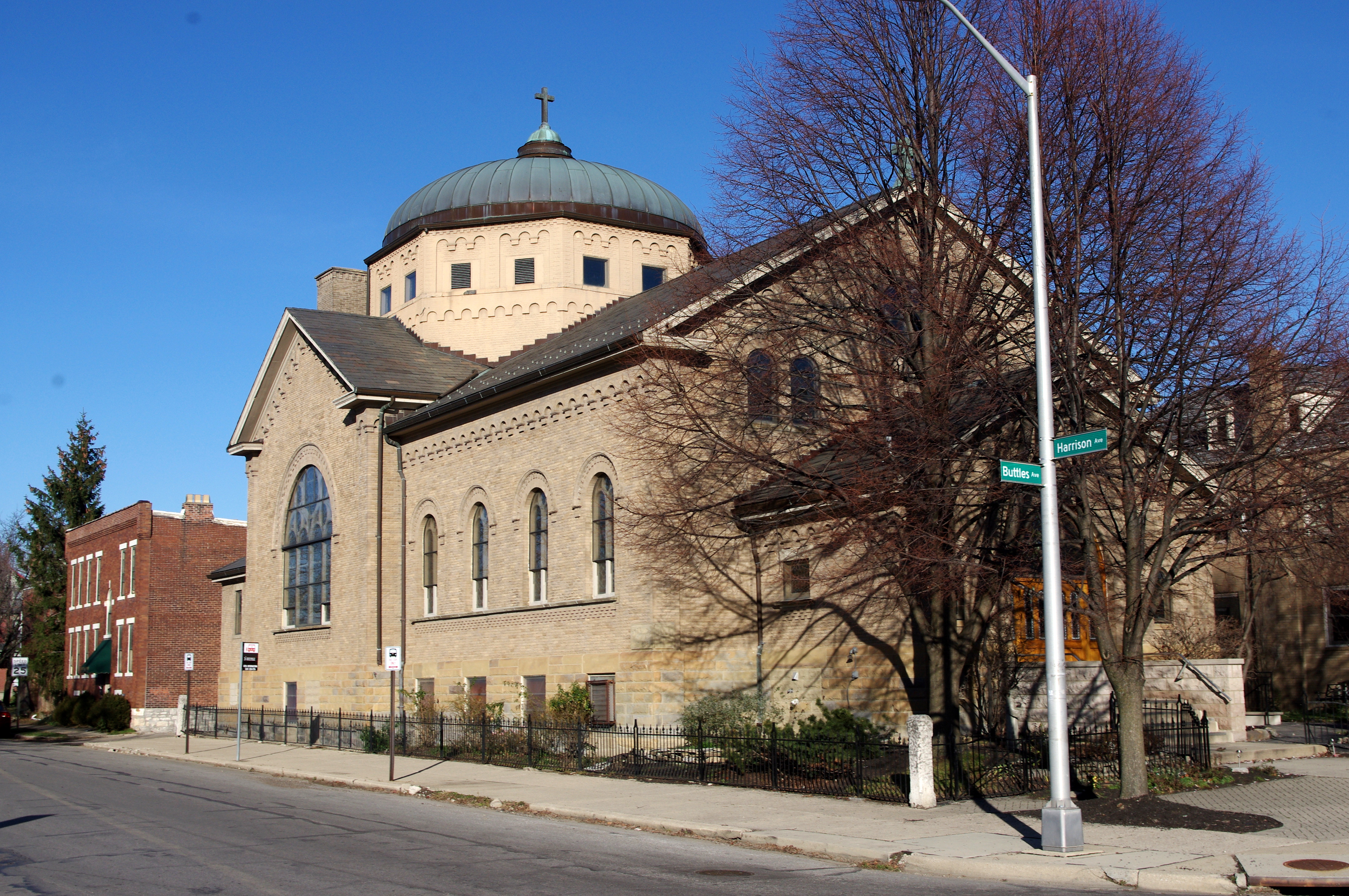
Saint Francis of Assisi Church

This Roman Catholic Church was built in 1896 by Bishop John Ambrose Watterson. In 1907 a school was built next to the parish and was staffed by seven Dominican nuns. During the city's urban renewal during the late 1950s, nearly 300 houses were torn down south of the church and the parish lost over two-hundred-fifty parishioners. The school was remodeled in 1961 but was closed due to a lack of enrollment in 1970. In 1973 the school burned down. The church celebrated its centennial in 1996 and is still a spiritual home to several Victorian Village residents.

== Attributes ==
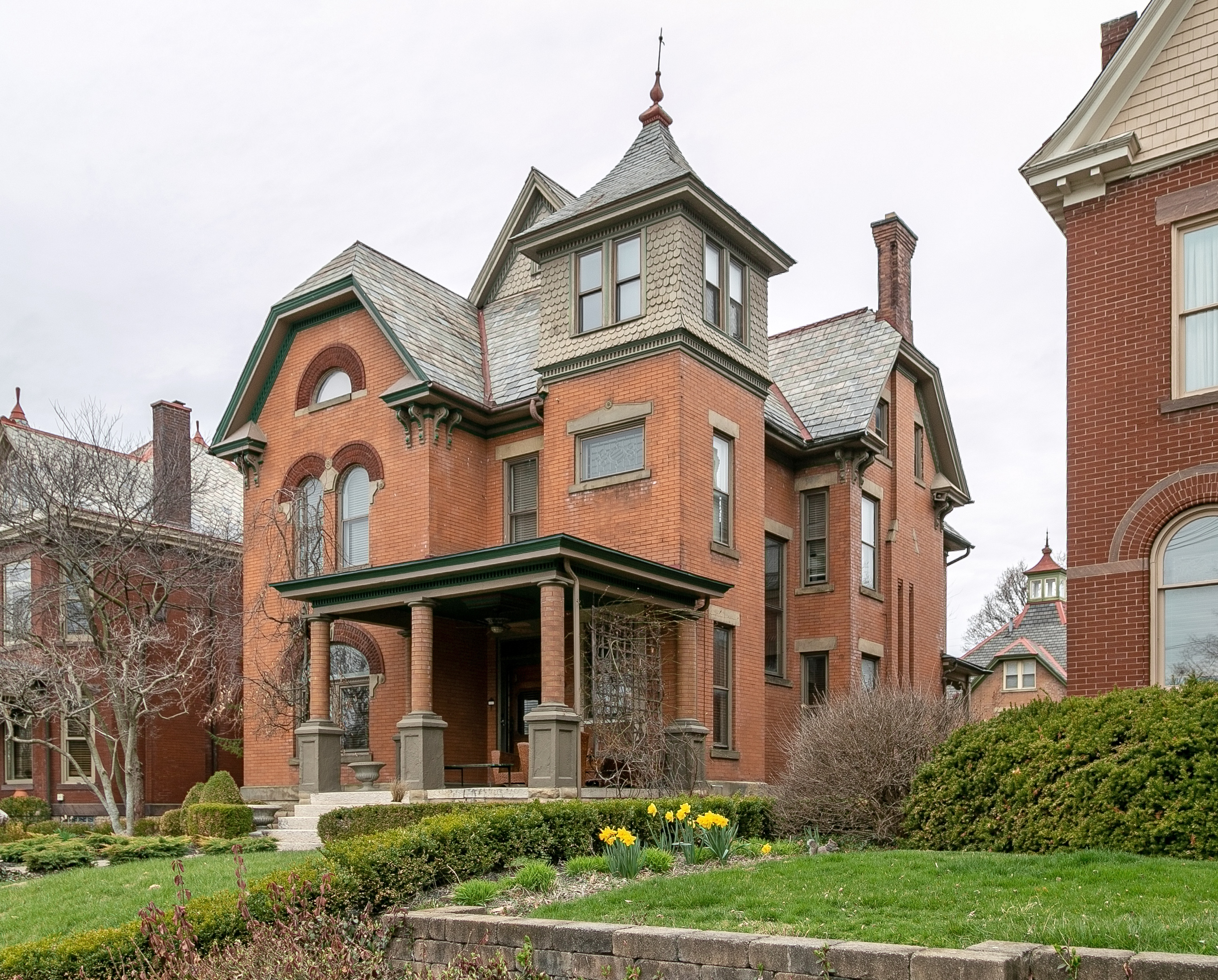
One of many grand homes in the neighborhood

Victorian Village is consistently ranked a top Columbus neighborhood. It is ranked the ninth most walkable neighborhood in Columbus with a walk score of eighty-three. Some homes have been split into rented apartments, but many are nationally registered historical landmarks. A mix of housing densities adds to the diverse nature of Victorian Village. Neighborhood renewal has contributed to significant property values increases over the past two decades.

Once a year, usually in September, the community holds the annual Victorian Village Tour of Homes and Gardens, with approximately a dozen houses open for viewing and walking tours. The night before, an additional "bonus" house not on the general public's list is toured as part of a fund-raiser for the area. Dinners served in local restaurants, and occasionally individuals' homes, also support it.

The City of Columbus has designated part of Victorian Village, along with portions of the Short North and Italian Village as a "market ready" Community Reinvestment Area, with available 15-year, 100 percent tax abatements if projects include 10 percent affordable housing, with options to buy out of the requirement.

== Transportation ==
Victorian Village has relatively easy access to public transit. It received a transit score of fifty-six and a bike score of seventy-four. Therefore, personal automobiles are not a necessity to the residents. The Central Ohio Transit Authority (COTA) regularly runs bus services up and down High Street and Neil Avenue making transportation accessible to the residents.

== Education ==
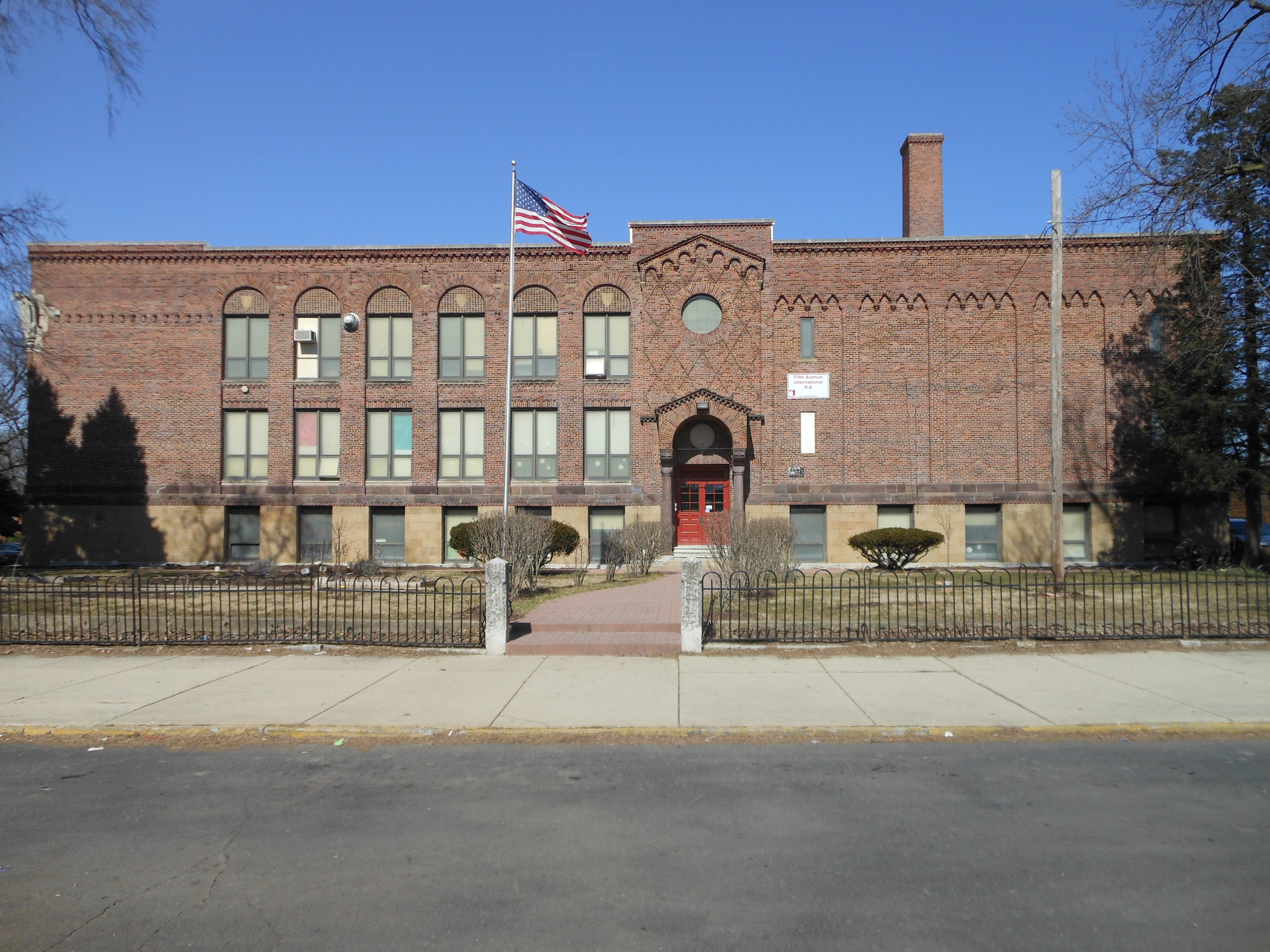
Everett Middle School

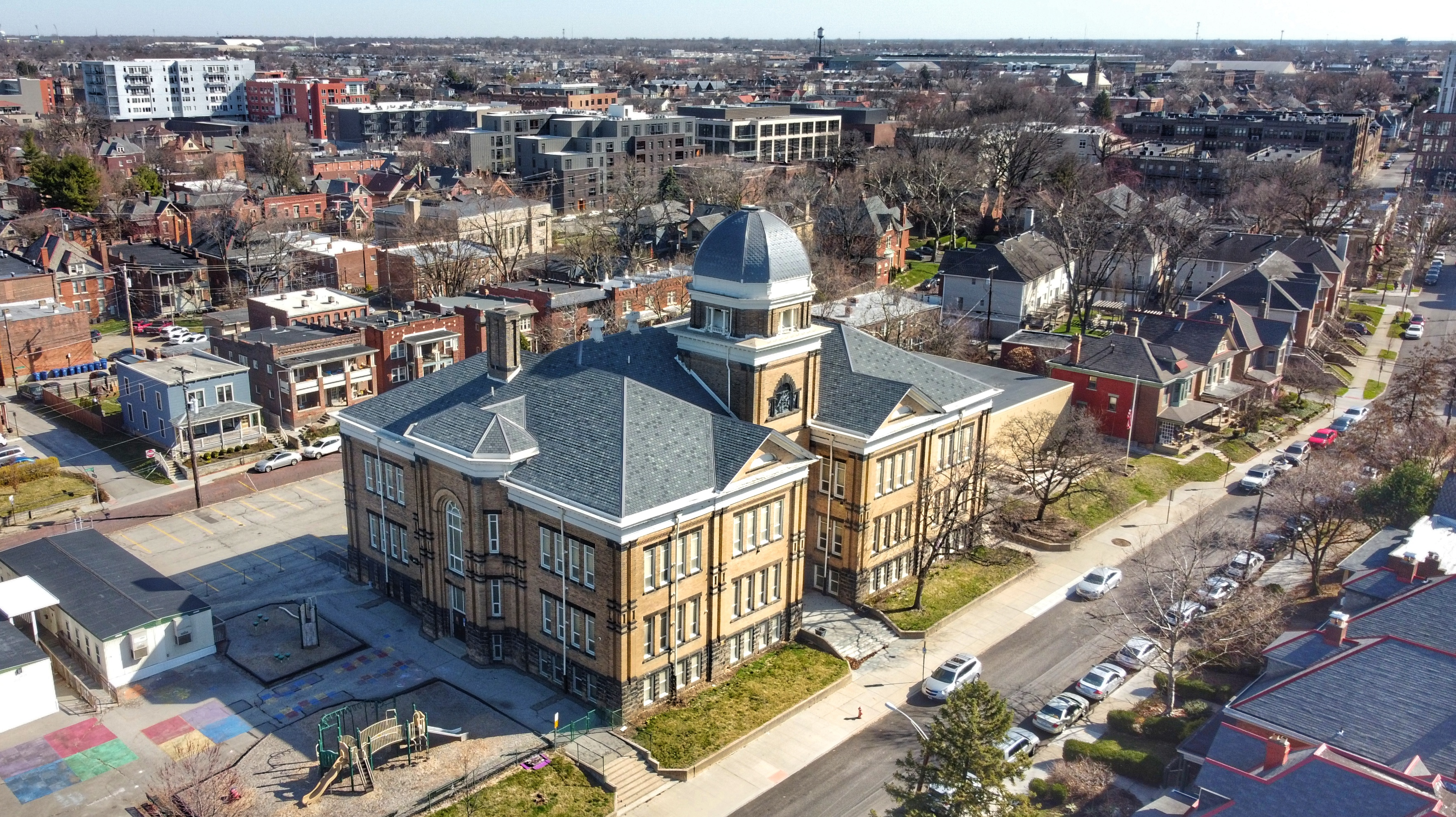
The Hubbard Mastery School

Victorian Village is located within the Columbus City Schools District. The Hubbard Mastery School is a PreK–6 public school on Hubbard Avenue and is the neighborhood's designated elementary school.

== Entertainment ==
=== Short North Tour of Homes & Gardens ===
This event usually occurs on the third Sunday in September. During this event, people can tour and visit the historic homes within both Victorian Village and the nearby neighborhood, The Short North. The tour generally consists of approximately ten restored historic homes within the two neighborhoods.

=== Dining and nightlife ===
A number of bars and restaurants can be found along the eastern boundary on North High Street. The neighboring neighborhood, The Short North, shares the High Street border with Victorian Village and is known for its entertainment in nightlife and dining among other characteristics. Other bars, restaurants, and sources of entertainment can be found scattered throughout the neighborhood.
