= Lewis Sells =

American circus proprietor (1841-1907)

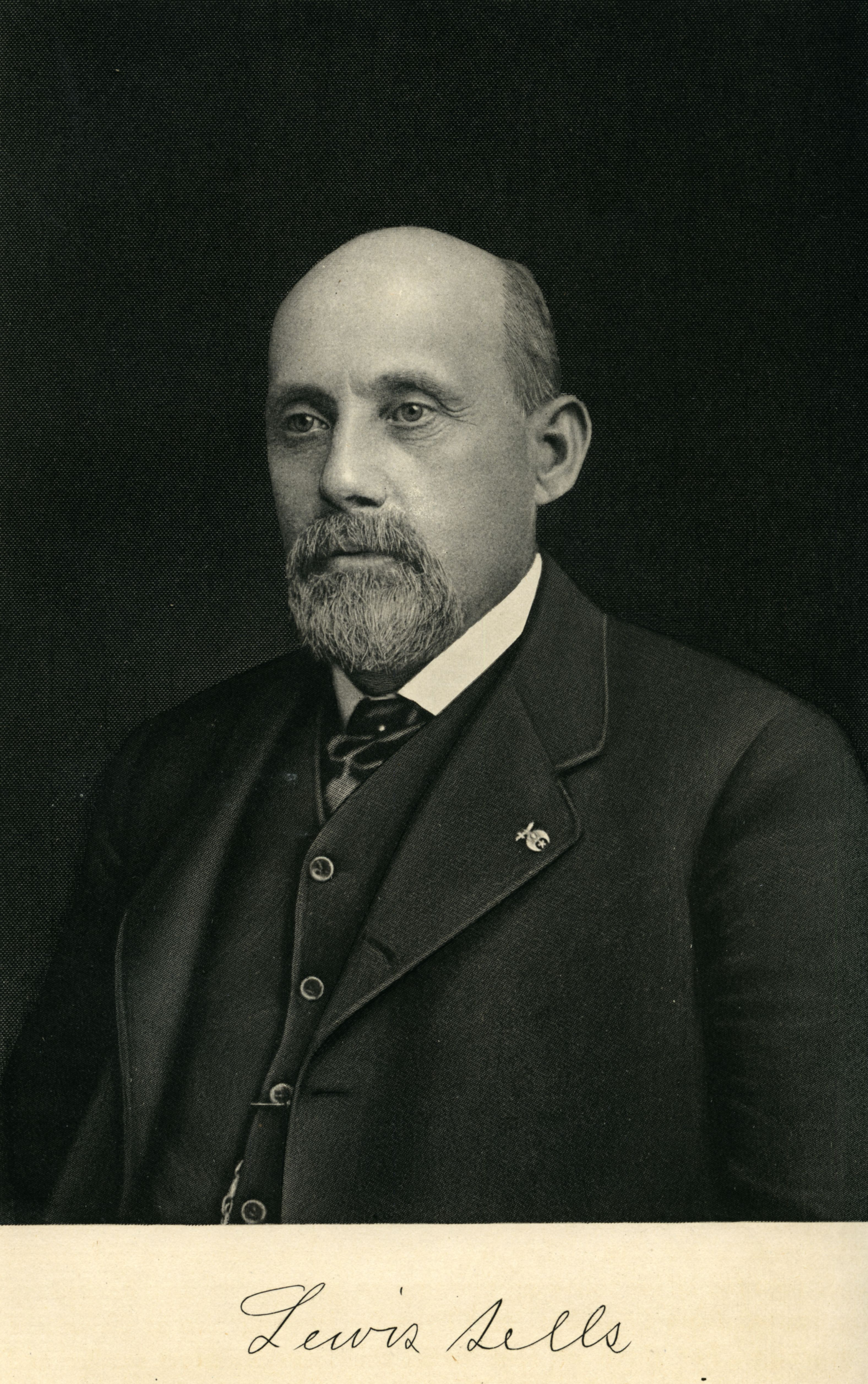
- Born: November 12, 1841; Columbus, Franklin County, Ohio, U.S.
- Died: September 5, 1907 (aged 65); Columbus, Franklin County, Ohio, U.S.
- Resting place: Green Lawn Abbey
- Other names: Uncle Lew
- Occupation: Circus proprietor
- Known for: Sells Brothers Circus
- Awards: Circus Hall of Fame (1995)

Lewis Sells (November 12, 1841 – September 5, 1907) was an American circus proprietor and a co-founder of Sells Brothers Circus who was elected into the Circus Hall of Fame in 1995.

== Early life ==
Lewis Sells was born on November 12, 1841, in Columbus, Franklin County, Ohio, United States.

His grandfather was Ludwig Sells, a German immigrant who brought his family to the State of Ohio in 1801.

== Career ==
Lewis Sells worked with his father before moving to Cleveland with his brother Ephraim, where he drove and conducted on the horse car line for James Anderson.

Post-American Civil War, he joined his uncle William Kent in the auction business, eventually branching out on his own as an auctioneer. Three of the Sells brothers went into the Columbus auction trade. Lewis and his brother Allen began to travel as auctioneers and often positioned themselves by circuses to benefit from the crowds.

In 1871, while traveling with their auction business, Lewis and Allen were persuaded by George Richards to invest in used circus property, and together they readied their show for spring. He partnered with his brothers Ephraim, Allen, and Peter to launch the Sells Brothers Circus in 1872. He worked as assistant manager and superintendent, reporting to Allen Sells. The traveling show lasted thirty-five years and kept its winter headquarters in Columbus, Ohio. On April 27, 1872, they staged their first Columbus performance.

In 1878, he served as general manager for their new no. 1 show, which was called the Sells Bros. Great European Seven Elephant Railroad Show. He later managed the Sells Bros. no. 2 show, partnering with his former employer James Anderson in what became the S. H. Barrett Circus. Lewis Sells became the head after Allen's departure in 1882, but his constant attention to the S. H. Barrett show left the Sells no. 1 show without his direction and less profitable. Tensions mounted until 1887, when the two were united as "Sells Bros. and Barrett's Colossal United Shows," with Lewis as general director. Much property was sold, keeping only the best for the new company.

The Sells Bros. Circus was jointly owned in 1895 by Lewis, Ephraim, and Peter Sells. In 1896, Lewis Sells managed the merger of the Sells Circus with James A. Bailey's Forepaugh show, producing the Great Forepaugh and Sells Bros. Circus. While Bailey secured his territory from the Ringlings overseas, the show remained under Sells management, keeping it at a high standard and traveling in over 60 cars for years.

His brother Ephraim's death in 1898 left him and Peter to continue the partnership. Lewis Sells co-owned the show from 1898 to 1904 with Peter Sells, James A. Bailey, and William Washington Cole.

With Peter and Allen Sells passing in 1904 and no heirs interested in continuing the family business, Lewis Sells sold the family's remaining stake in the show. The assets were auctioned publicly, split between James A. Bailey and the Ringling brothers. The sale to Bailey was completed in 1905 for $150,000 cash. Bailey died in 1906, leaving the circus to be bought by the Ringlings.

== Death ==
Lewis Sells died on September 5, 1907, in Columbus, Franklin County, Ohio, United States.

== Legacy ==
Lewis Sells was inducted into the "Management" category of the Circus Hall of Fame in 1995.
