= Circus House =

Historic house in Columbus, Ohio

- U.S. Historic district – Contributing property
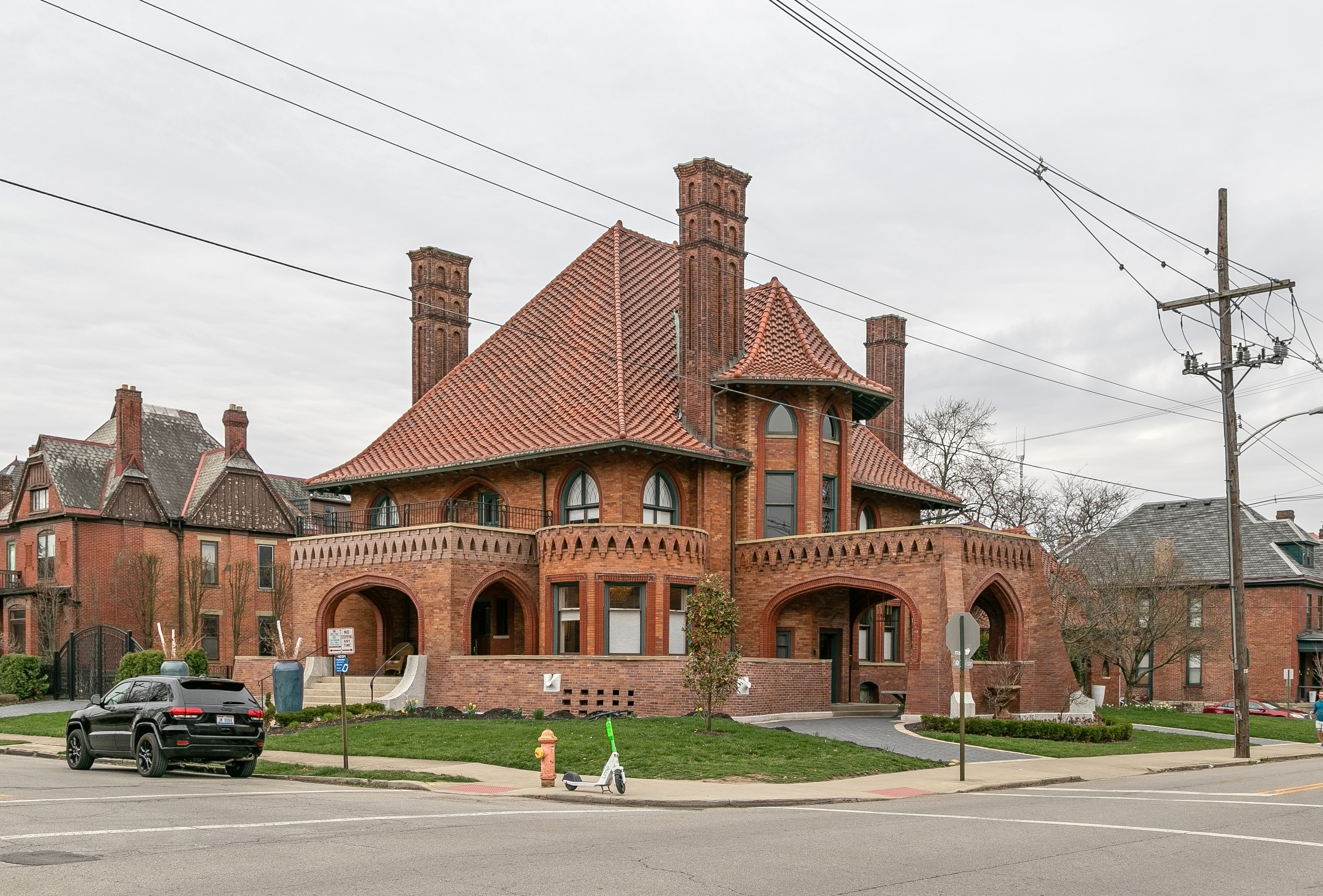
- Interactive map of Circus House
- Location: 755 Dennison Avenue, Columbus, Ohio
- Coordinates: 39°58′38″N 83°00′34″W
- Area: 7,414 sq ft (688.8 m^{2})
- Built: 1895
- Architect: Yost & Packard
- Website: http://circushouse.com (archived copy)
- Part of: Near Northside Historic District (ID80003001); Victorian Village

The Circus House, also known as the Sells House, is a building in the Victorian Village neighborhood of Columbus, Ohio. The three-story, 7,414 sq ft (688.8 m^{2}) house was designed by Yost & Packard in an eclectic style, using elements from numerous architectural styles. It was built for the family of Peter Sells, one of the owners of the Sells Brothers Circus. The house is located at the northwest corner of Goodale Park, one of the first city parks in Columbus.

Peter and Mary Sells' house was built in the 1890s, with influence from a family trip in 1891. The building was completed in 1895, and furnished with décor from the family's world travels. Peter Sells split from his wife in a widely publicized divorce in 1900, and he died in 1904. The house subsequently saw a range of commercial uses, from an office building to a daycare center, a fraternal order for commercial travelers, a nursery school, and an alcoholics' recovery house. In 1998, the house returned to single-family residential use, and each of the three owners have completed various renovations to the house during their ownerships.

The house is a contributing property of the Victorian Village Historic District, overseen by the Victorian Village Commission, and the Near Northside Historic District, on the National Register of Historic Places.

== History ==
=== Early and commercial uses ===
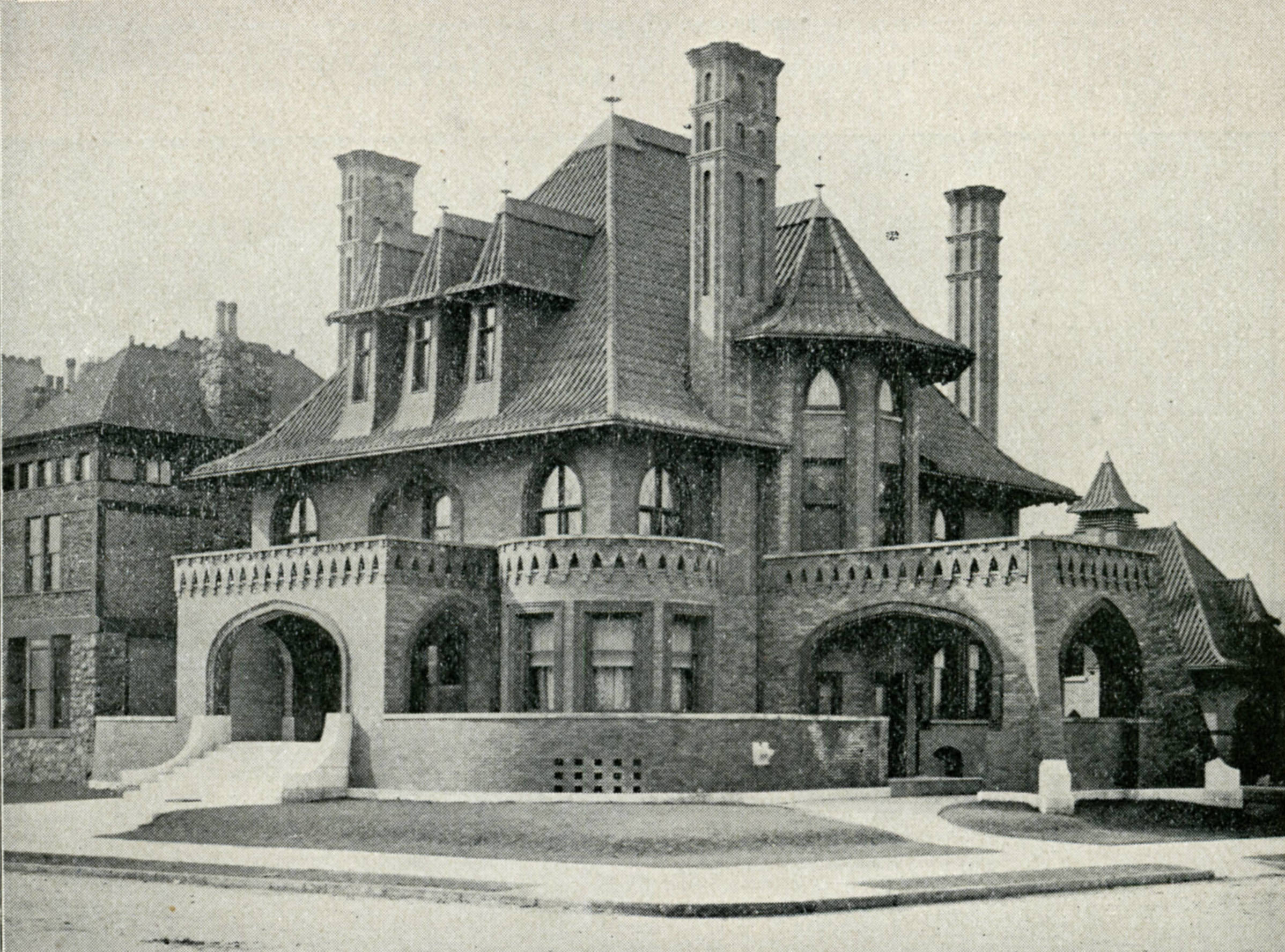
The house in 1898

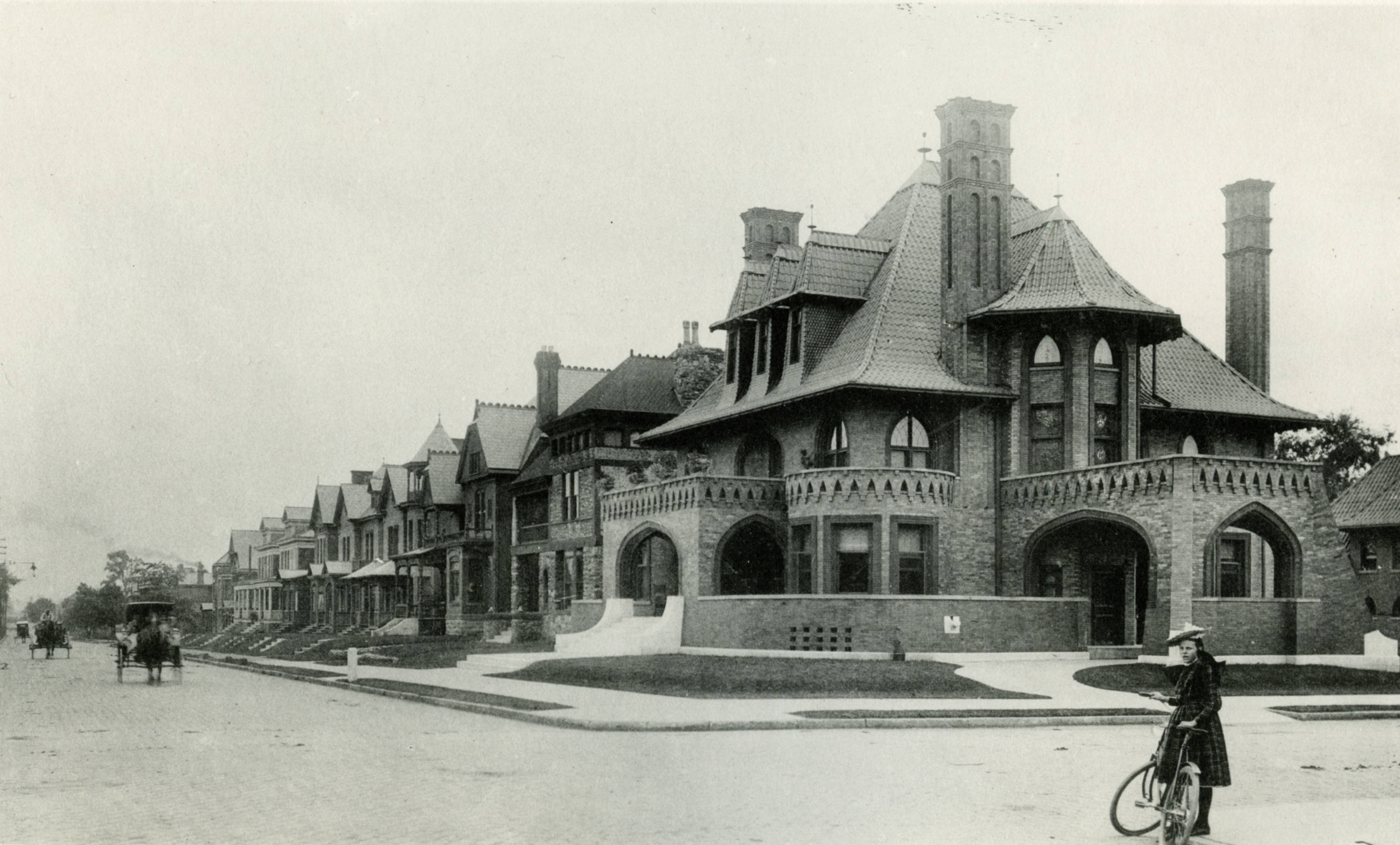
The house among others on Dennison Avenue, 1897

The house was commissioned in the 1890s by the circus owner Peter Sells of Sells Brothers Circus. Yost & Packard designed the house with influence from the Sells family trip to California in 1891. The dramatic rooflines, curved Moorish style windows, and Ludowici-tile roof suggest a similar profile to that of a circus big top. The firm also designed the carriage house, occupied by the servants of the Sells family. The house was completed in 1895. Once settled in the new residence, the Sells' furnished the house with pieces from their travels around the world, creating a lavish and exotic feel to the interior. Sells built it to placate his wife Mary, who did not share his enthusiasm for the circus, animals, and the frequent travels the business involved. Mary was alleged to have taken an affair with William Bott, the wealthy owner of the Bott Brothers' Billiards and Saloon.

Urban legends recall that the Sells kept lions or elephants in the house's basement or carriage house, and that a carousel was installed in the house's third floor, though no evidence supports the legends.

The Sells family occupied the house until 1899, when Peter and Mary divorced due to her alleged infidelity. The ensuing divorce trial was front-page news, as Columbusites became fascinated with the scandalous circumstances the divorce was filed upon. Peter Sells gained the split from his wife in December 1900 and removed her from his home. Since Peter's death in 1904, the usage of the Sells Brothers house has varied greatly, ranging from a nursery school to the House of Hope for Alcoholics, a shelter house for recovering alcoholics, only from 1960 to 1961. The Columbus chapter of United Commercial Travelers was noted as an early good steward of the house. It was first used for offices in 1920; one of the owners was the local Fraternal Order of Police, from 1953 to 1959. In 1963, it became a daycare center, which operated until 1997. It was sold the next year for $429,000.

=== Return to residential use ===
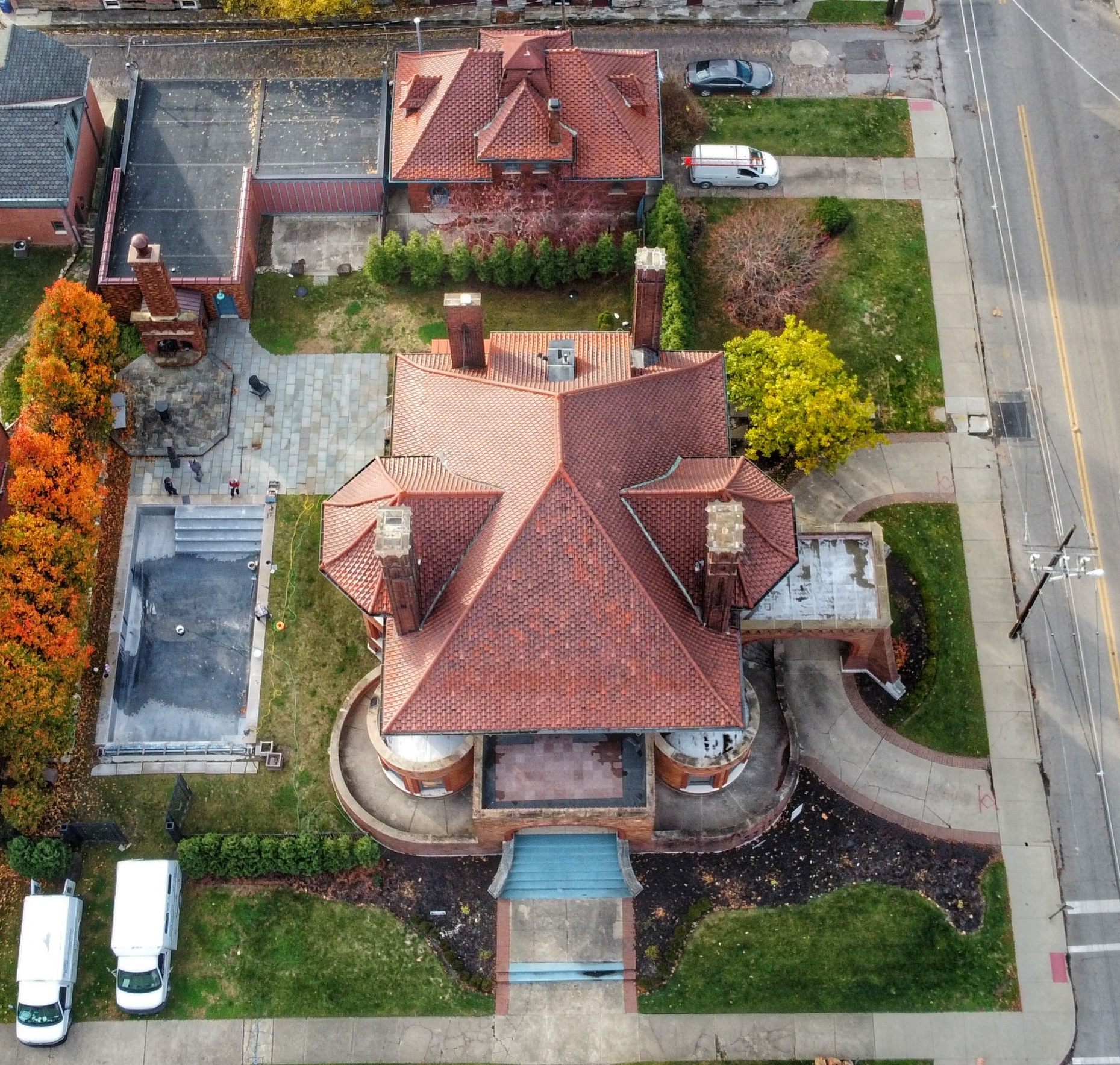
Aerial view of the house, property, and carriage house

After a long time in commercial use, the building once again became a private house for the Brownstein family after their 1998 purchase. Under their ownership, it was restored to a pristine condition, and was resold in 2008 with a list price of $1.4 million. The Hardings purchased the house; Fritz Harding, formerly a trustee of the Columbus Historical Society and a department chair at the Columbus College of Art and Design, reworked the interior to reflect its circus theme. Amid decorative additions, the family also installed a geothermal system and rainwater catchment cistern in the house. The Hardings finished repairs and subsequently moved to a quieter house, selling the Circus House for $1.55 million in December 2016.

Its next owner, Weston Wolfe, altered portions of most of the house's rooms, staining the floor, painting trim, adding black quartz flooring in the entrances, switching out most of the light fixtures, and renovating the two first-floor bathrooms. Weston also installed a 20-by-38 ft. pool at the house in 2017, finished a bathroom on its second floor, and added a kitchen on its third floor. In June 2019, the house was back on the market – Wolfe had sold his business and filed for bankruptcy, with nearly all of his debts from the house. In January 2020, Huntington Bank foreclosed on the property; around this time the house was broken into by vandals at least once. Wolfe had hoped to use the house to entertain customers for his insurance company, though instead it led clients to believe Wolfe did not need their business in order to be successful.

During Wolfe's ownership, the house fell into extreme disrepair, with trim and mantelpieces torn off, tile and flooring removed, plumbing and mirrors smashed, and the electrical line to the house severed, among other damage estimated at $1 million. At foreclosure, the house was put up for auction, though failed to attract its minimum bid. It was relisted in July 2020 without a minimum.

The Henry family then purchased the house for $873,400. The new owners estimated a repair at at least the cost of sale, and hired an architect and a designer to restore it. Fritz Harding estimates the house is eligible for the National Register of Historic Places, and hopes the current owner's renovations will lead to its listing. The new owners planned to live in the house, rent out the first floor for events, use the third floor as a short-term rental, and convert the carriage house into a permanent meeting space for Riegel Financial, which Paige Henry is president of. The renovations involved replacing the electrical service and wiring, pouring concrete for a remaining dirt portion of the basement floor, repairing plumbing and gas lines, replacing its geothermal unit, and adding solar panels to the garage roof. Decorative changes included wallpaper, murals, redoing the staircase, and restoring fireplaces. The work was completed by March 2022.

== Attributes and design ==
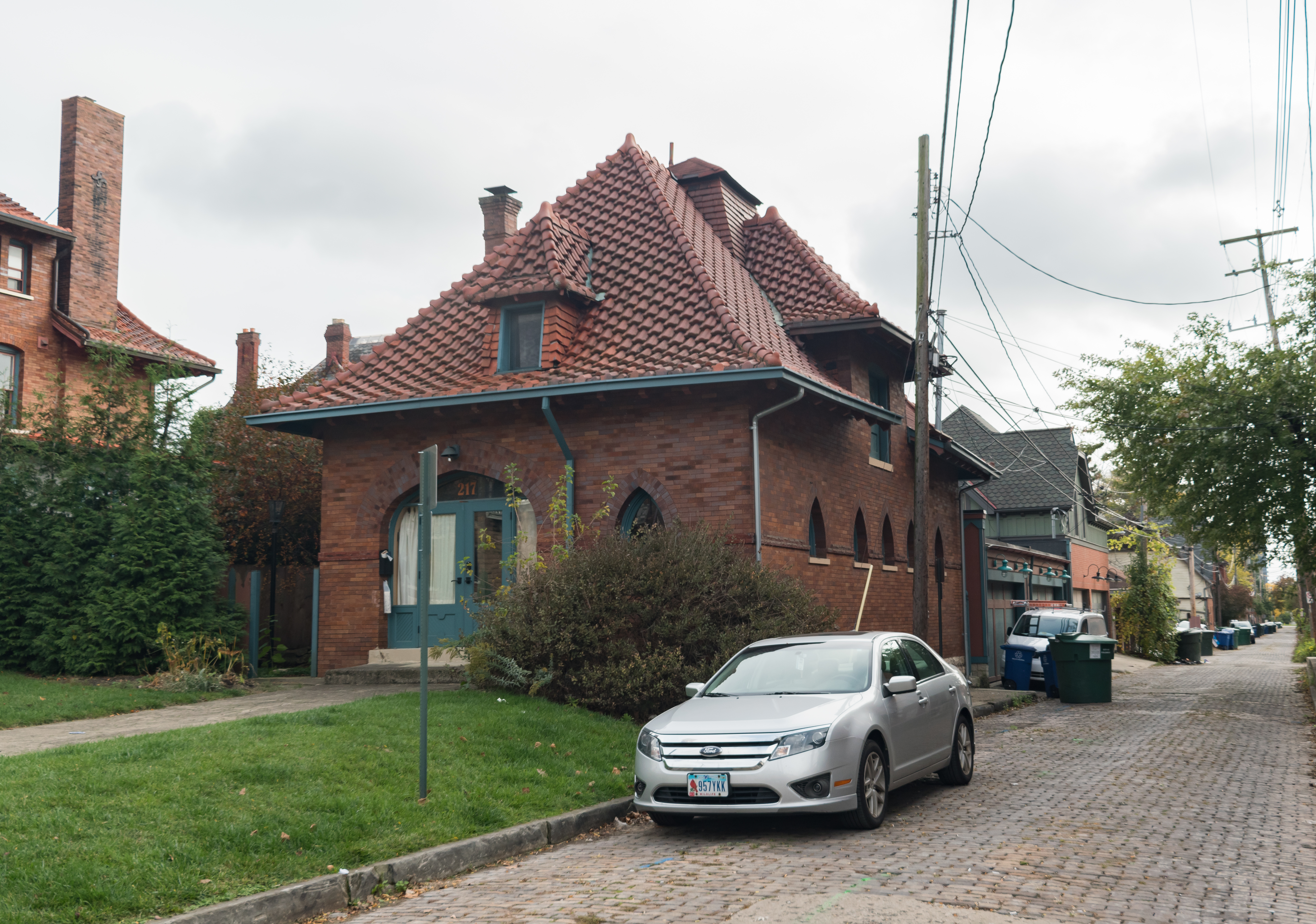
The carriage house at 217 Buttles Avenue

The eclectic building is widely considered one of Columbus's great houses, designed by perhaps its most famous architects. The Circus House is usually credited to Frank Packard, though designs are signed by his firm Yost & Packard, with George Henry Bulford surmised as a major contributor to the design. The architects utilized elements of High Victorian Gothic, Mission Revival and French chateau design, sometimes also called "Circus Gothic". The house stands out on Dennison Avenue with its steep red-tile roof, flared out like a circus tent. The three-story house features a pair of round first-floor rooms which have exterior brick cornices resembling the fringe of a circus tent. The house has 7,414 sq ft (688.8 m^{2}) divided into twelve rooms, including four bedrooms, five full bathrooms, and two half-baths. It has geothermal heating and solar panels atop the garage.

The house has changed throughout its ownerships, including with the removal of its three front-facing dormer windows some time before 1973. Before 1965, the house's east-facing porch was simply repaired, with a decorative cornice removed. The cornice was recreated during the house's 2020-2022 renovation.

The Circus House includes its own 1,656-square-foot carriage house at the neighboring 217 Buttles Avenue. During their ownership, the Hardings renovated the carriage house into a two-bedroom, 2.5-bath home to allow for its use as a guest and rental space. They commissioned a four-car garage (finished in 2011) and large patio nearby, with an outdoor fireplace and 30-ft. chimney, resembling the chimneys that are part of the Circus House. Wolfe purchased the carriage house separately from the Hardings in 2017 for $480,000, and attempted to sell it in April 2019 for $650,000, relisting for $525,000 in 2020. The Henrys purchased the building months after buying the main house, and began renovation in early 2022.

The Circus House has been included in numerous home tours in the area including the Short North Tour of Homes & Gardens. It has been the location for prominent gatherings, like an After-School All-Stars event with Arnold Schwarzenegger in March 2017, and other activities including art exhibits and filming for a music video and a horror movie.

A chest of circus memorabilia, which once belonged to Willie Sells (a brother of Peter), is kept in the house and always sold with it. The chest first came to the house during the Brownsteins' ownership, when it was given to them by a neighbor.

== See also ==
- Toledo and Ohio Central Railroad Station, built in the same year and similar style by the architects
