= Day at the Circus =

Day at the Circus may refer to:

- Day at the Circus (1901 film), documentary short by Edwin S. Porter
- Day at the Circus, a 2006 episode of American comedy series Robot Chicken; see List of Robot Chicken episodes
- A Day at the Circus, working title of the 1939 Marx Brothers film At the Circus
- A Day at the Circus, a 1987 program in the Kidsongs series

== See also ==
- A Day with the Circus, 1911 documentary short produced by William Nicholas Selig
- Day After the Circus, 1897 film by American Mutoscope Company
