= Charles Mayer (animal collector) =

American animal collector, plagiarist (~1862–1927)

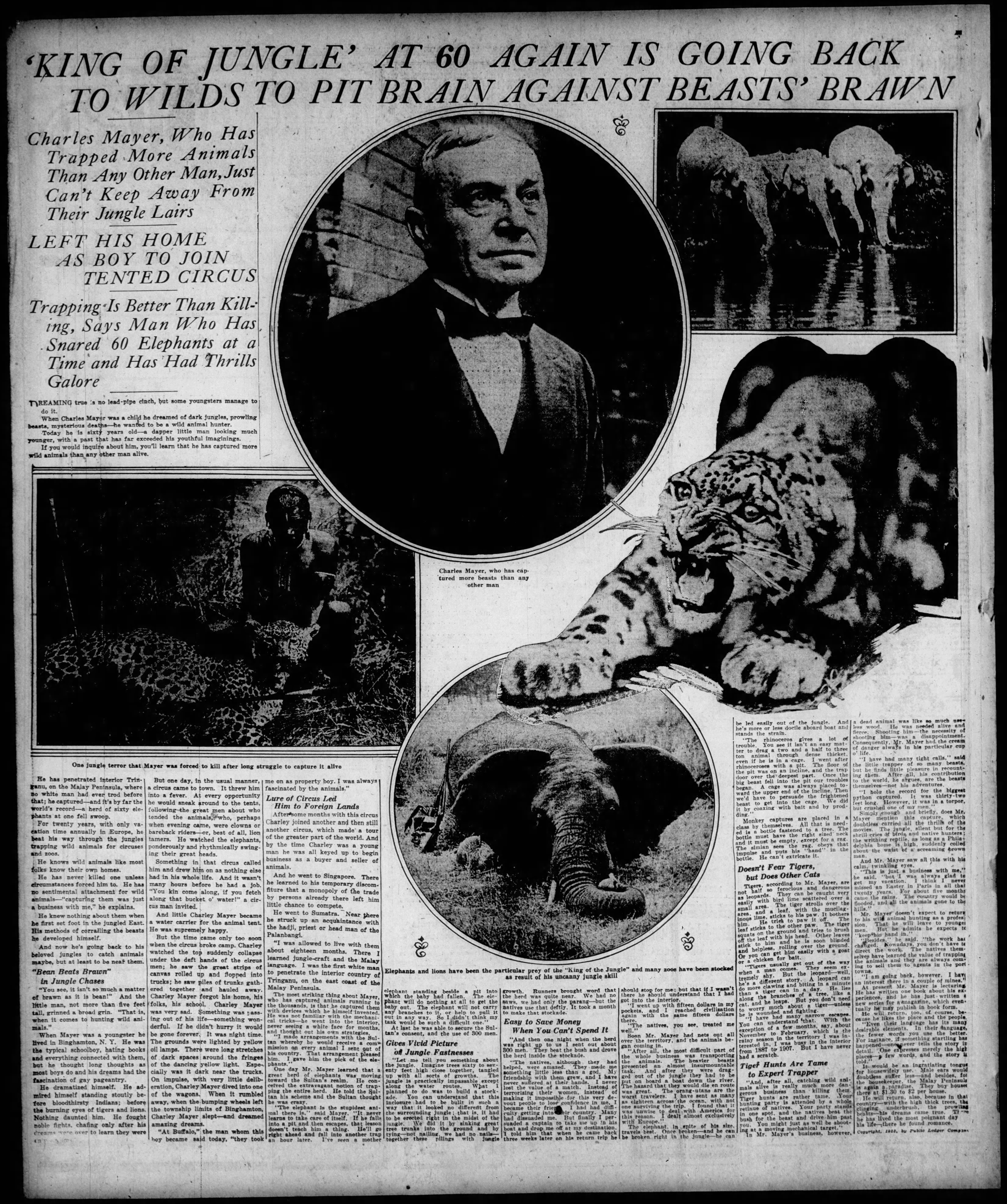
Charles Mayer newspaper feature (The Journal Times, Racine, Wisconsin, 1923)

Charles Mayer (1862 – May 14, 1927) was an American animal collector, tamer, and circus supplier. He also wrote books on his animal capture adventures and one of his books was found to have plagiarised several paragraphs from a book by an Indian elephant capture specialist.

Originally from Binghamton, New York, Mayer ran away at age seventeen to join the Sells Brothers Circus as an elephant trainer. Mayer reported that circus owner J. A. Bailey eventually sent him to India to bring back elephants. Per his own reports, he ended up staying in Trengganu, Malaysia for many years. Mayer attempted to build an animal-export business to American circuses by offering low prices, but often listed animals he had not yet trapped for sale and was not very successful. Nearby Singapore was then (and remained until World War II) the central city of the Asian animal trade and Mayer used a property on Orchard Road as a transshipment site before forwarding animals on to buyers in America or Australia.

His 1922 book Trapping Wild Animals in Malay Jungles was initially successful; it was even chosen for display at the Malayan section of the 1924 British Empire Exhibition. One contemporary review described Mayer's book as having "the merit of novelty", concluding that it covered exciting "new ground in entirely original fashion." Ironically, the book proved to be massively plagiarized from the writings of G. P. Sanderson, a British official in charge of elephant catching in Mysore, India. The plagiarism of Sanderson's Thirteen Years Among the Wild Beasts of India was detected by the director of the Raffles Museum, F. N. Chasen, who stated in 1933, "Mayer's book should not be taken seriously."

His commentary is often representative of a colonial mindset. His storytelling is influenced by pulp fiction tropes, and he "stocked his tales with human characters that expanded existing stereotypes."

Mayer died of "Asiatic fever" (likely malaria) in New York City at age 64. According to his New York Times obituary, he supplied animals to Hagenbeck and "other owners of menageries and animal shows."
