= Ephraim Thompson =

American circus performer (1859–1909)

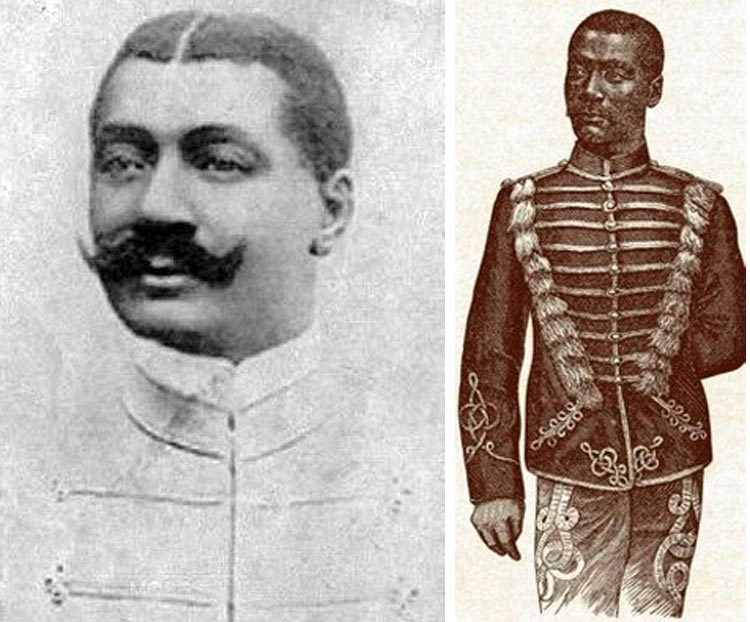
Ephraim Thompson

Ephraim Thompson (October 28, 1859 – April 17, 1909) was a well-known American elephant trainer.

== Career ==
Thompson was trained by Stewart Craven, who was inducted into the Circus Hall of Fame in 1979.

Thompson was part of the Adam Forepaugh Show but since he was black, he was forced to remain in the background while Addie Forepaugh Jr. presented the acts. In 1887, he performed with Carl Hagenbeck's International Circus from April to September. In 1895, he was with Circus Salamonsky Moskau performing a tight rope trick between two elephants that were holding the rope. In 1902, he performed at the Blackpool Tower Circus in England. He eventually went to Europe with his act in the 1890s and 1900s. He actually had a somersaulting elephant in his act. the first great American elephant trainer—and, by all accounts, the most humane.

== Family life ==
Born October 28, 1859, in Colchester, Ontario, and died April 17, 1909, in Alexandria, Alexandria Governorate, Egypt. He married Dolinda de la Plata née Roba in 1887 and had a son in 1889 named Leo. At the time of his death he was married to the circus performer Jessie Kelly (Leopold), who after Thompson's death married the acrobat/comedian/ringmaster Sam Nagle (Elton), who was best known for his act "Domestic Mishaps," performed at the London Hippodrome before the Shah of Persia, a notoriously dour man who nonetheless laughed throughout Elton's performances.
