= Day at the Circus (1901 film) =

- Directed by: Edwin S. Porter
- Production company: Edison Manufacturing Company
- Distributed by: Edison Manufacturing Company
- Release date: 1901
- Country: United States
- Language: Silent

Day at the Circus is a 1901 American silent film produced and distributed by Edison Manufacturing Company and directed by Edwin S. Porter. It depicts a parade of the Great Forepaugh and Sells Bros. Combined Circus followed by a horse race in the tent. It was one of many early silent film documentaries depicting circuses. Historian Katherine H. Adams said, "The circus' emphasis on movement and quick transition, as well as its lack of dialogue, made it a perfect subject matter for silent film."

== Production and release ==
The 1901 Edison Catalog describes the film:

We present here a series of interesting pictures and show a number of scenes just as witnessed by a visitor to the Great Forepaugh and Sells Bros. combined four-ring circus. We begin by showing the complete circus parade as it takes place in the street. The first scene shows the parade coming down a broad asphalt avenue with park in background. Entire parade shows elephants, camels, band wagons, chariots, cages of animals, and full circus paraphernalia, making a most interesting subject. The next picture shows the assembly or grand entry, and includes the entrance into the arena of the elephants, chariots, wild animals, horses, camels, etc. We next show an exciting horse race, consisting of eight horses, on which are mounted an Indian, a squaw, a Filipino girl, an Arab woman, an Arab, a cowboy and an English jockey and an American jockey. The picture concludes with a bareback team race. In this race two horses are abreast, the driver standing up, with one foot resting on one horse and one upon the other. They make two circuits of the ring and furnish a very exciting climax to the picture. We conclude the Day at the Circus Series with a fifty-foot picture, showing a very exciting chariot race. Two chariots appear in the race, one drawn by four white horses and the other by four bay horses.

== See also ==
- Edwin S. Porter filmography
