= Sells Ltd =

Coordinates: 51°30′52″N 0°06′31″W

- Founded: London, England, (1869)
- Founder: Henry Sell
- Headquarters: England
- Key people: Henry Sell (founder); Alfred Sell (brother of founder) (1853–1936); Charles Henry Sell (son of Alfred Sell and future head of company) (1889–1955)

Sells Ltd, an advertising agency, was founded in 1869 in London by Henry Sell (1851–1910). By 1900, it was the largest agency in the world with offices in London, Paris, Edinburgh and Montreal.

== History ==
In the 1950s, it made advertising history when it appointed the first woman to be a managing director in the business. Olive Hirst (1912–1994) had joined Sells in 1931 as a typist and then worked across a number of departments. In January 1950, she was the first women to be appointed to the Board and in 1954 she took over the managing directors role.

The agency won the Layton Trophy in 1959.

The agency was merged with another in the 1960s.

== Selected publications ==
- Sell's Dictionary of the World's Press. London: Sell's Advertising Agency, Ltd. (Henry Sell). 167 Fleet Street. LCCN ca12-801; OCLC 10833798 (all editions).
1. The Philosophy of Advertising: Matters Worth Reading, and Vitally Concerning Every Present and Future Advertiser.
2. OCLC
3. 181763076 (all editions)
4. Vol. 1. 1882.
5. The Philosophy of Advertising: And Newspaper Register.
6. OCLC
7. 733352911 (all editions)
8. Vol. 2. 1883.
9. Sell's Dictionary of the World's Press.
10. Vol. 6. 1886 – via Google Books (NYPL).
11. Vol. 7. 1887 – via Google Books (NYPL).
12. Sell's World's Press.
13. Vol. 7. 1887 – via Internet Archive (NYPL).
14. Sell's World's Press.
15. Vol. 33. 1914 – via HathiTrust (NYPL).
16. Vol. 34. 1915 – via HathiTrust (Michigan).
17. Vol. 35. 1919 – via Google Books (NYPL).
- Leading Editors of Magazinedom (with portraits): and Complete List of Magazines, &c. Vol. 2. London: Sell's Advertising Agency, Ltd. (Henry Sell). 167 Fleet Street. 1892. pp. 708–812 – via Internet Archive State Library of Pennsylvania. OCLC 898887164 (all editions).
- Sell's Directory of Registered Telegraphic Addresses, and Telegraphic Code (established 1885). OCLC 30395484 (all editions), OCLC 220827667 (all editions), 857599489.
- Sell's Telegraphic Code. OCLC 57643707 (all editions).
1. Via Google Books (Bodleian Library). 1885.
- Sell's British Exporters' Register & National Directory [Sell's National Directory and British Explorers' Register and Aviation Supplement]. OCLC 8023682 (all editions), OCLC 265768904 (all editions).

== Bibliography ==
=== References ===
- Advertiser's Weekly "More News About People" – "Charles Henry Sell". Vol. 170, no. 2209. London. October 28, 1955. p. 76 (column 4) – via Internet Archive. LCCN 46-37085, LCCN sv89-91566.
- "Olive Hirst". The Times (obituary). No. 64893. London. 4 March 1994. p. 21 – via Gale IF0500654804.
- "Sells Ltd". History of Advertising Trust. Archived from the original on September 21, 2013.
- Turner, Mark W. (Winter 2015). "Sell's Dictionary of the World's Press: Chronicler and Promoter of the Media Industry". Victorian Periodicals Review. Special Issue: Waterloo and Its Afterlife in the Nineteenth-Century Periodical and Newspaper Press. 48 (4): 607–624. doi:10.1353/vpr.2015.0059; JSTOR 24642978; OCLC 5978499876 (article).
- Western Daily Press and Bristol Mirror (February 18, 1936). "Death of Advertising Pioneer" (obituary of Alfred Sell). Vol. 154, no. 25981. p. 6 (column 2, bottom) – via Newspapers.com. LCCN sn88-63170.
