= Peter Sells =

American circus proprietor (1845-1904)

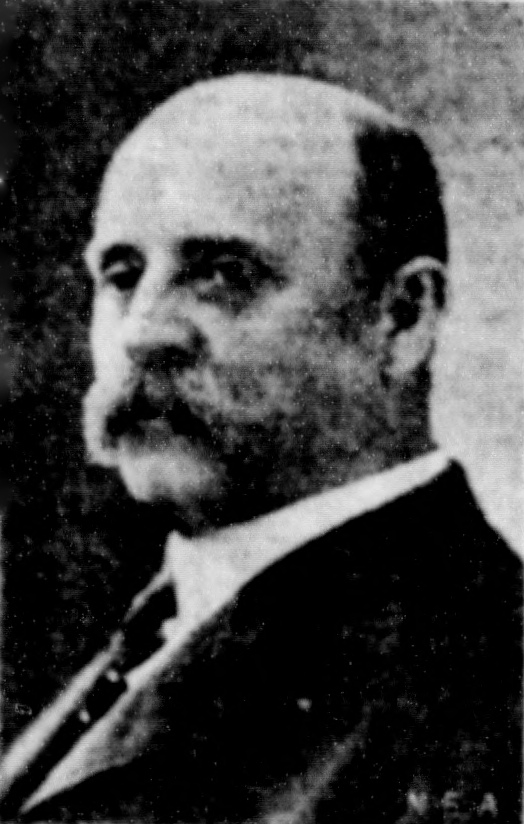
- Born: Peter Sells; April 6, 1845; Columbus, Franklin County, Ohio, U.S.
- Died: October 5, 1904 (age 59); Columbus, Franklin County, Ohio, U.S.
- Resting place: Green Lawn Abbey
- Occupation: Circus proprietor

Peter Sells (April 6, 1845 – October 5, 1904) was an American circus proprietor who was a co-founder of Sells Brothers Circus.

== Early life and education ==
Peter Sells Jr. was born on April 6, 1845, in Columbus, Franklin County, Ohio, United States.

Named after his father, he was one of eleven children of Peter and Hannah Ranney-Sells.

He spent his early years in Columbus, and after his father relocated to Cleveland in 1854, he attended the Mayflower School until age 18. He later took a commercial course in Chicago in 1863.

== Career ==
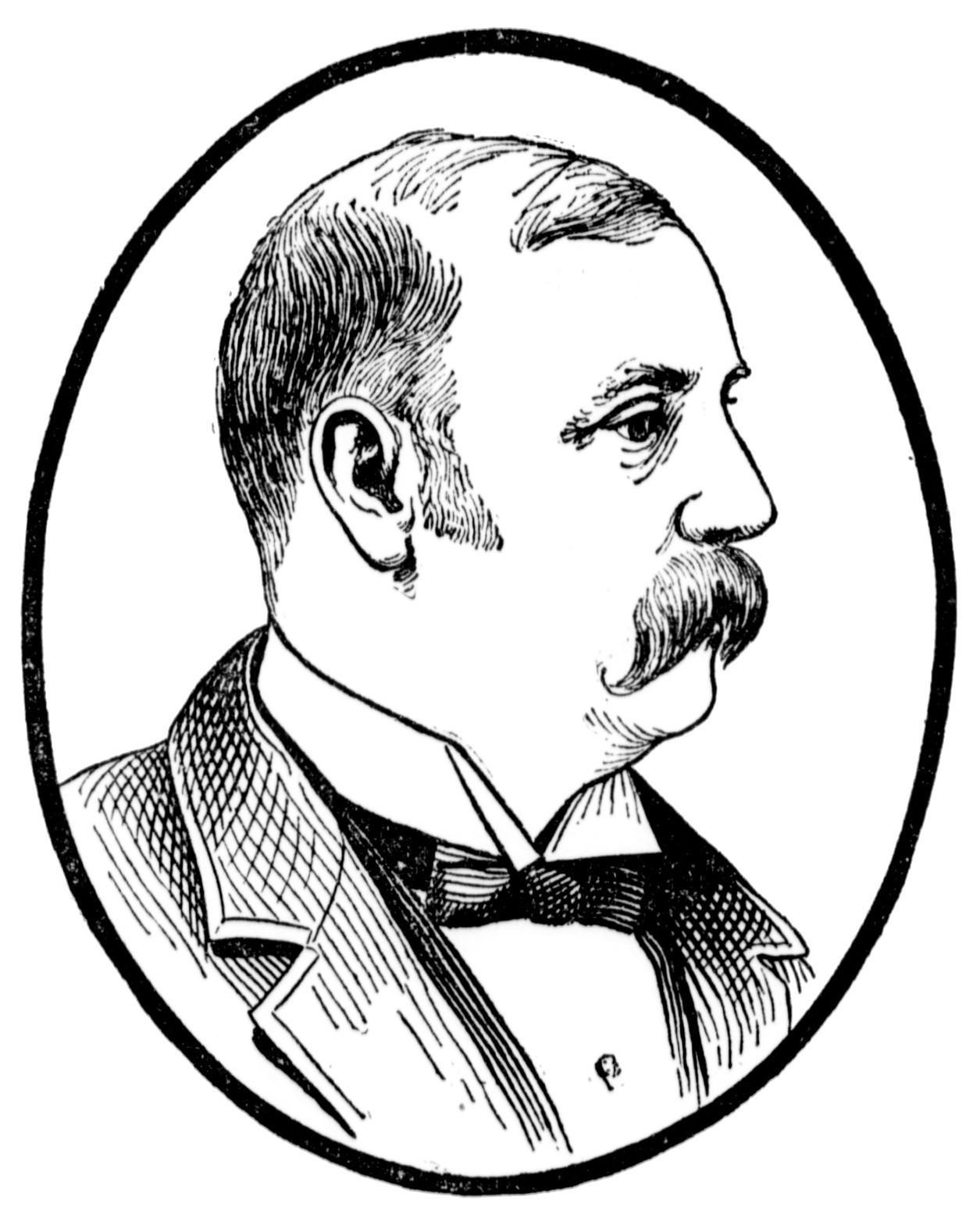
Peter Sells oval portrait sketch, 1898

He started earning money delivering the Cleveland Leader and worked in the newspaper's office from 1862 to 1867, holding the position of circulation manager for three years.

While studying at business college in 1863, Peter Sells sold dry goods, including berries, on commission for his father in Chicago.

In 1865, he accompanied the former business manager of The Leader to the Pennsylvania oil regions. Peter Sells worked for Rockefeller & Andrews, managing shipping interests for the future Standard Oil Company after being noticed by John D. Rockefeller in Cleveland. That year, he joined his brothers in Burlington, Iowa, as auctioneers.

In 1868, he and his brother Lewis traveled by wagon and peddled goods in Illinois and Wisconsin.

Peter Sells returned to his home city of Columbus in 1870. He then opened an auction store in Columbus with Allen, which remained until 1872, when the four Sells brothers launched a joint enterprise. While working as a reporter on the Ohio State Journal at Columbus, he was offered a small salary as a business agent for the undertaking. He partnered with his brothers Ephraim, Lewis, and Allen in 1871 to launch what became the Sells Brothers Circus, which started as a wagon show. Peter acted in the capacity of general agent in advance of the show, attending to the routing, railroad contracts, and advertising. On April 27, 1872, they staged their first performance in Columbus, and traveled across the country in wagons.

When James A. Bailey offered Peter Sells $5,000 a year to act as his General Agent in 1878, during the launch of the Sells Bros. Great European Seven Elephant Railroad Show, his brothers realized his worth and responded by giving him a stake in the enterprise.

The Sells Bros. Circus was jointly owned in 1895 by Peter, Ephraim, and Lewis Sells. He retained his interest when the Sells Brothers' show was consolidated with the Forepaugh shows in 1896. He was one of four proprietors of the Adam Forepaugh & Sells Bros. Consolidated Show (later Forepaugh-Sells Circus).

The death of his brother Ephraim in 1898 left him and Lewis to continue the partnership. Peter Sells co-owned the show from 1898 to 1904 with Lewis Sells, James A. Bailey, and William Washington Cole. Continuing to live in Columbus, he reduced his involvement in the circus after selling portions of his shares to various investors. With Peter and Allen Sells passing in 1904 and no heirs interested in continuing the family business, his last living brother sold the family's remaining stake in the show.

== Personal life ==
He met his wife in the summer of 1876, when rain delays left him in Edina, Missouri, staying at the hotel run by J. C. Luker, her father.

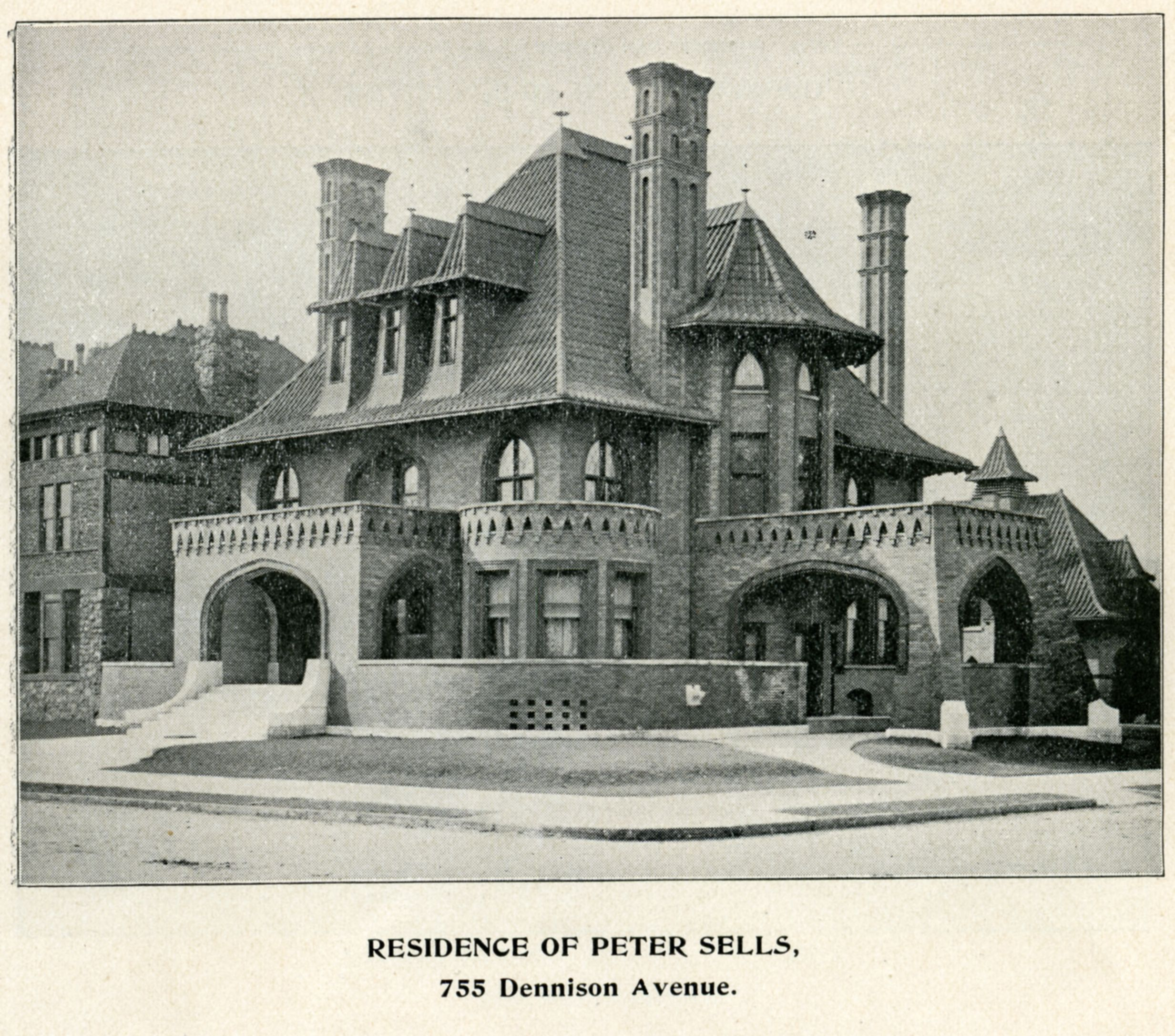
Residence of Peter Sells, 755 Dennison Avenue

In Canton, Missouri, Peter married Mary (née Luker) in 1878, and not long after they moved to Columbus, where the circus was based. Peter Sells commissioned Frank Packard in 1895 to design the Circus House, a $40,000 Romanesque residence at 755 Dennison Avenue for his wife Mary and their daughter Florence. At the time the house was built, Peter and his three brothers ranked among Columbus's wealthiest citizens. In 1900, he divorced his wife, accusing her of infidelity and citing certain men as co-respondents. The trial, lasting nearly two months, ended when Mrs. Sells agreed not to contest further. She received about $20,000 in alimony, and Sells was granted the divorce on statutory grounds.

Early in 1901, Peter Sells and his daughter Florence moved back into the house, having been separated from his wife for over a year before the divorce. He sold the home soon afterward.

When the Sells Brothers' circus wintered in Topeka, Kansas twice in the early 1880s, the family invested in local real estate. Peter Sells alone held about $200,000 in property, among them an East Sixth Street lot leased to the Miller Lumber Company and the Arion building on Kansas Avenue. With his brother Lewis, he co-owned buildings at 804–806 Kansas Avenue, the William Green & Sons building, the Levi building, as well as vacant lots and residences. His wealth was estimated to be around the million mark.

== Death ==
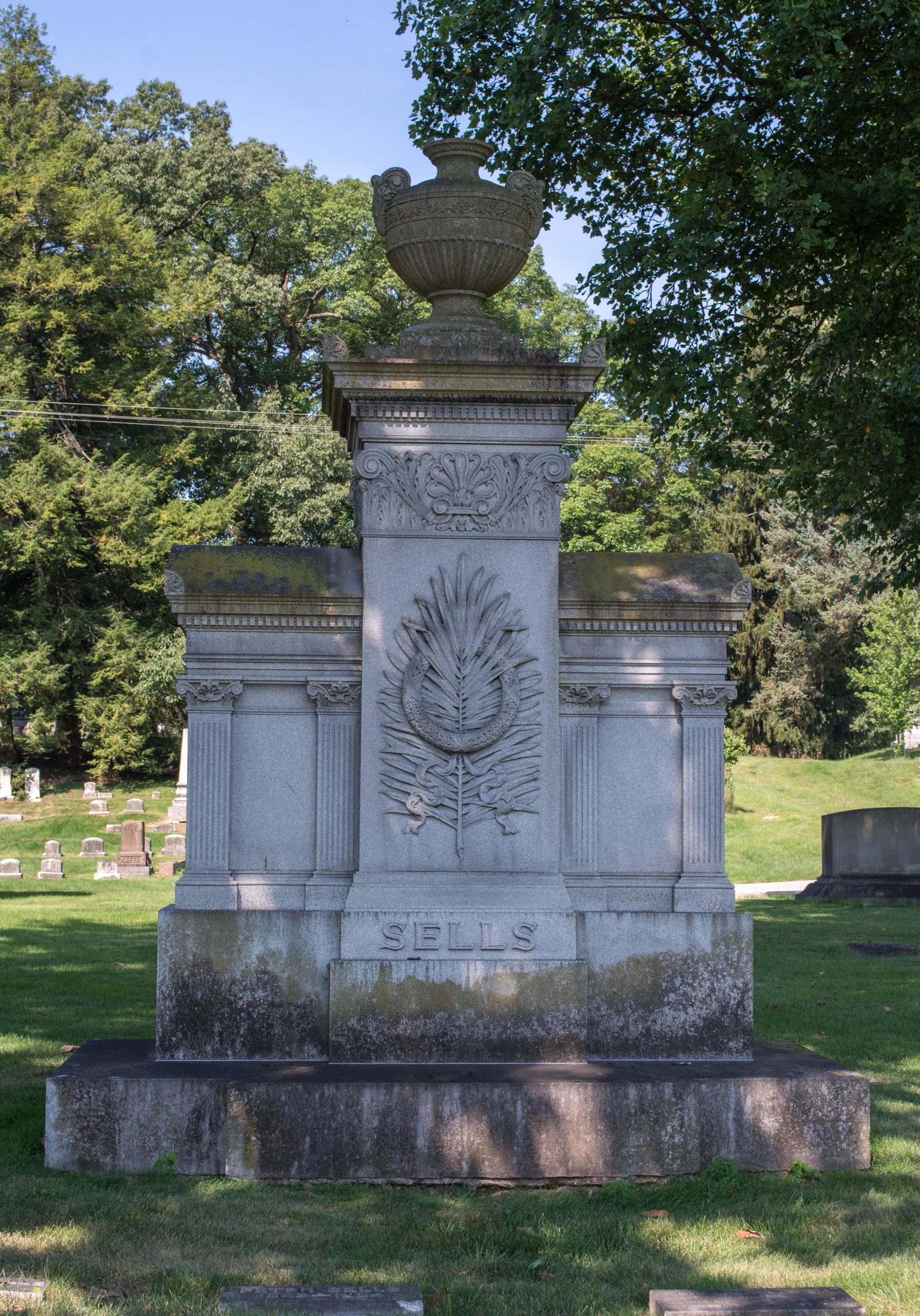
Grave of Peter Sells at Green Lawn Cemetery

On a business trip to Topeka in early August, Peter Sells arranged for an addition to the Arion building. He admitted to feeling ill. After returning home to Columbus, he was stricken with apoplexy as he stepped off a streetcar at his residence. Peter Sells died on October 5, 1904, in Columbus, Franklin County, Ohio, United States, at age 59.
