= Willie Sells =

American circus performer and proprietor (1866-1908)

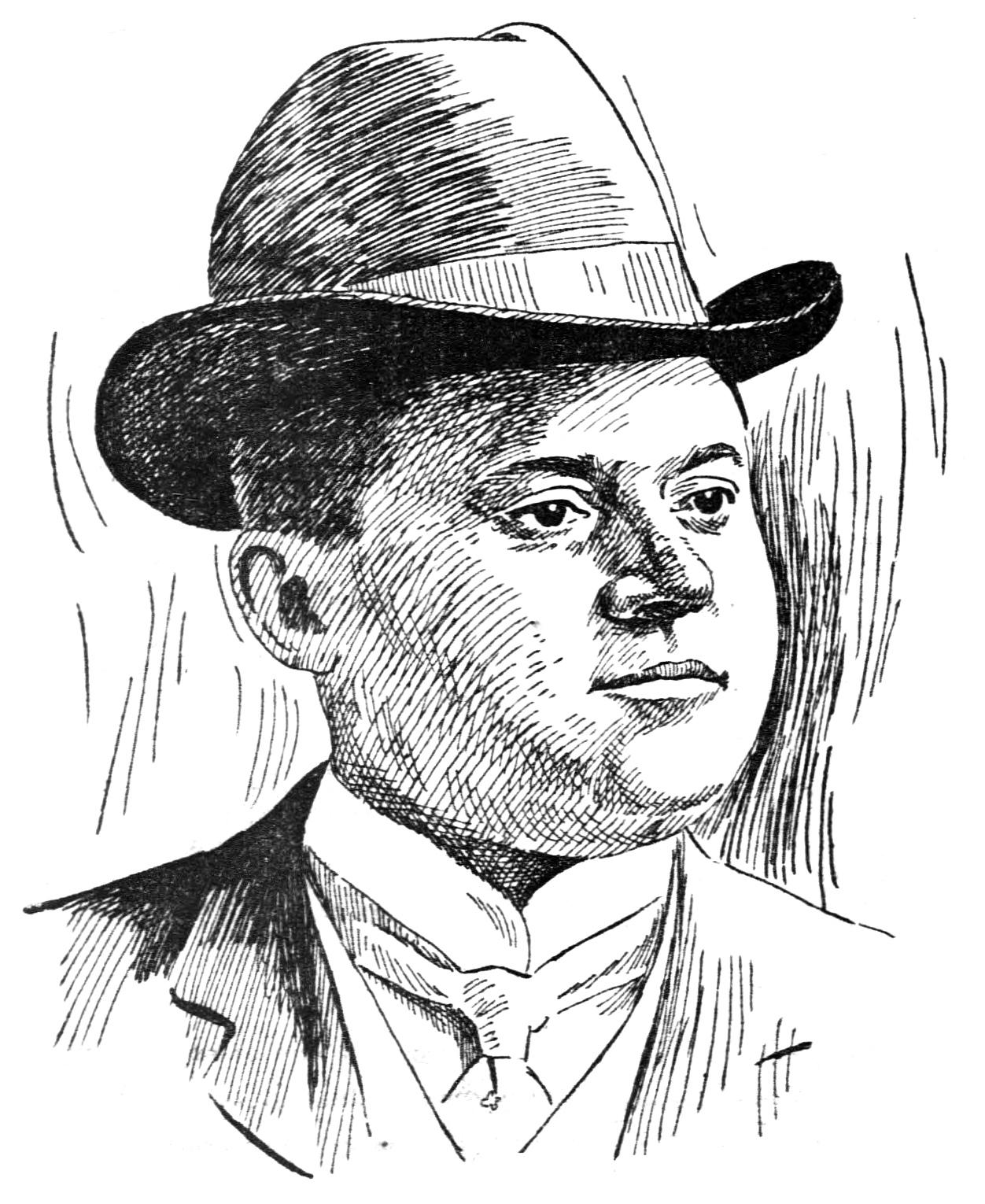
- Born: William Sells; April 6, 1866; U.S.
- Died: February 17, 1908 (age 41); New York City, New York, U.S.
- Resting place: Topeka Cemetery
- Occupation: Circus proprietor
- Father: Allen Sells

Willie Sells (April 6, 1866 – February 17, 1908) was an American bareback rider and circus proprietor.

== Early life and education ==
William "Willie" Sells was born on April 6, 1866, in the United States.

He was the adopted son of Allen Sells of the Sells Brothers Circus.

== Career ==
At six, Willie Sells entered the ring of the Sells family circus in Columbus, Ohio, as a rider. His father and uncles had opened the circus in 1872, and young Willie performed alongside top American and European showmen. Years of hard work expanded his repertoire, earning him national acclaim as a circus performer. After Willie Sells was taught bareback riding, he became the first rider to jump to a standing position on the back of a galloping horse without using his hands. This accomplishment in its era was the greatest feature of any circus, and it was widely advertised and was the "making" of the Sells Bros. Circus.

Willie Sells described how he once sold photographs of himself to spectators, making $15–$30 a day, and gave all his earnings to his mother until age 21. He supplemented his income by shining shoes, selling sandwiches, and doing errands.

In 1878, he featured on the program of the Sells Brothers' new no. 1 show, which was called the Sells Bros. Great European Seven Elephant Railroad Show. Willie stayed on with the show when his father, Allen Sells, departed the circus around 1880 to develop his real estate holdings in Topeka, Kansas.

For the 1882 season, he performed two acts in the Sells Brothers' Museum, Menagerie & Circus, including a jockey routine and a four-horse performance. On April 19, 1882, Columbus hosted the season opener of the Sells Brothers' show, attended by 8,000. Despite being trampled by horses the following night, Willie Sells finished his act to heavy applause.

Willie Sells traveled with the Barnum & Bailey Circus to Europe in 1889, where he gained distinction as the first American rider before the Queen of England. Though offered double salary to stay another year, he declined, saying he had promised to return and travel with his uncles' Sells show.

In 1894, Willie Sells was part of the Sells & Rentfrow Circus, working the New Mexico circuit in November and afterward Texas. That year, his father, Allen Sells, died, leaving an estate of $200,000, much of it in Topeka real estate.

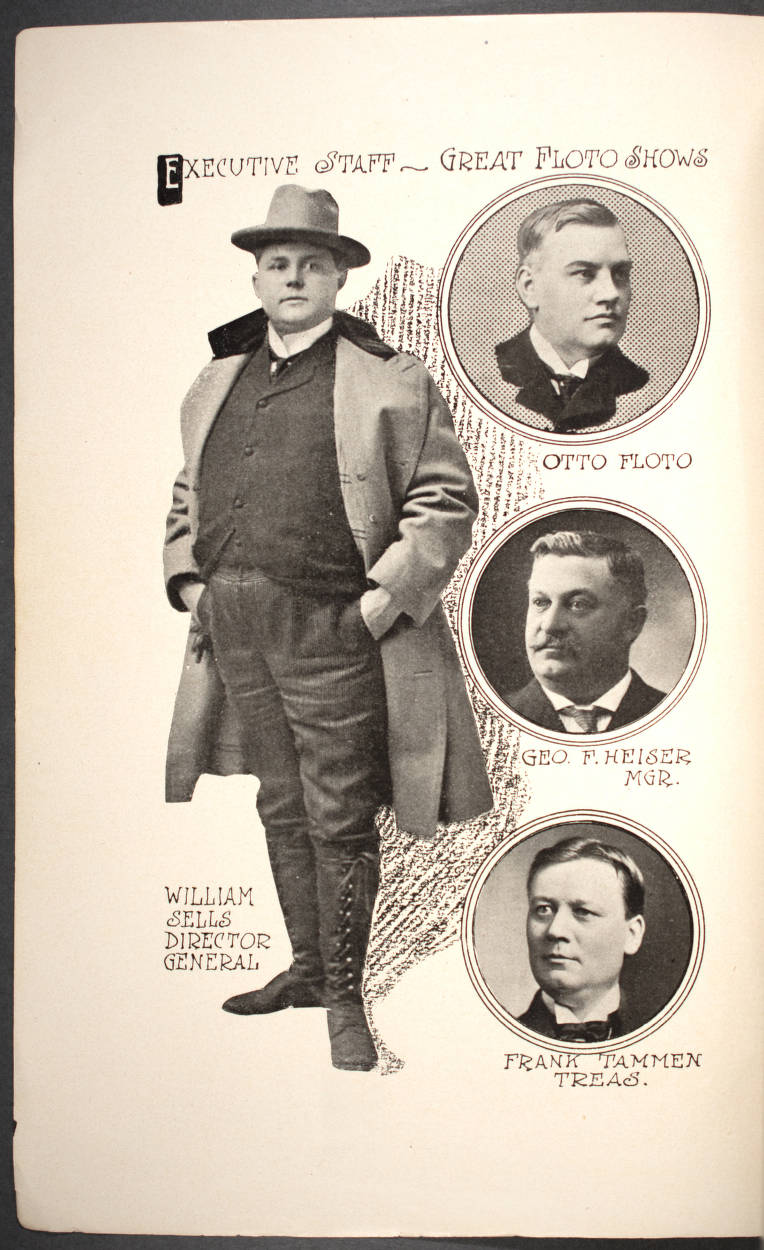
William Sells, Director General of Great Floto Shows

He was involved, at one point or another, with Hummel, Hamilton & Sells Shows in 1897.

He later became proprietor of the Sells & Gray Circus. The Great William Sells Shows combined with James H. Gray’s New Olympian Hippodrome in 1900, but the resulting Sells & Gray Circus failed in 1901 and was sold at sheriff's auction in Algiers, Louisiana. Willie also served as a general agent for Walter L. Main from 1899 to 1901 and co-managed the Great William Sells & Downs Consolidated Shows from 1902 to 1905 with Martin Downs.

He became associated with The Denver Post's Harry Heye Tammen and Frederick Gilmer Bonfils, who started the Floto Dog and Pony Show in 1902. Before the 1906 season, the newspapermen hired Willie Sells to manage the show, capitalizing on the public recognition of the Sells name. Tammen soon renamed it the "Sells Floto Circus," but dismissed Willie before the season ended for unknown reasons. Willie later claimed he had been hired for the use of his name and a salary of $100 a week plus expenses.

Willie Sells's use of the Sells name for his circus caused conflict with the Sells Brothers, prompting him to sue them. A 1909 lawsuit by Ringling Bros. against Sells Floto sought to block the Sells name, but the court allowed it, citing Willie Sells's role with the show, while forbidding use of the original brothers’ picture.

== Death ==
Willie Sells died on February 17, 1908, in New York City, New York, United States. His body was returned to his home in Topeka, Kansas, for burial. He was buried in Topeka Cemetery.
