= Green Lawn Abbey =

- U.S. National Register of Historic Places
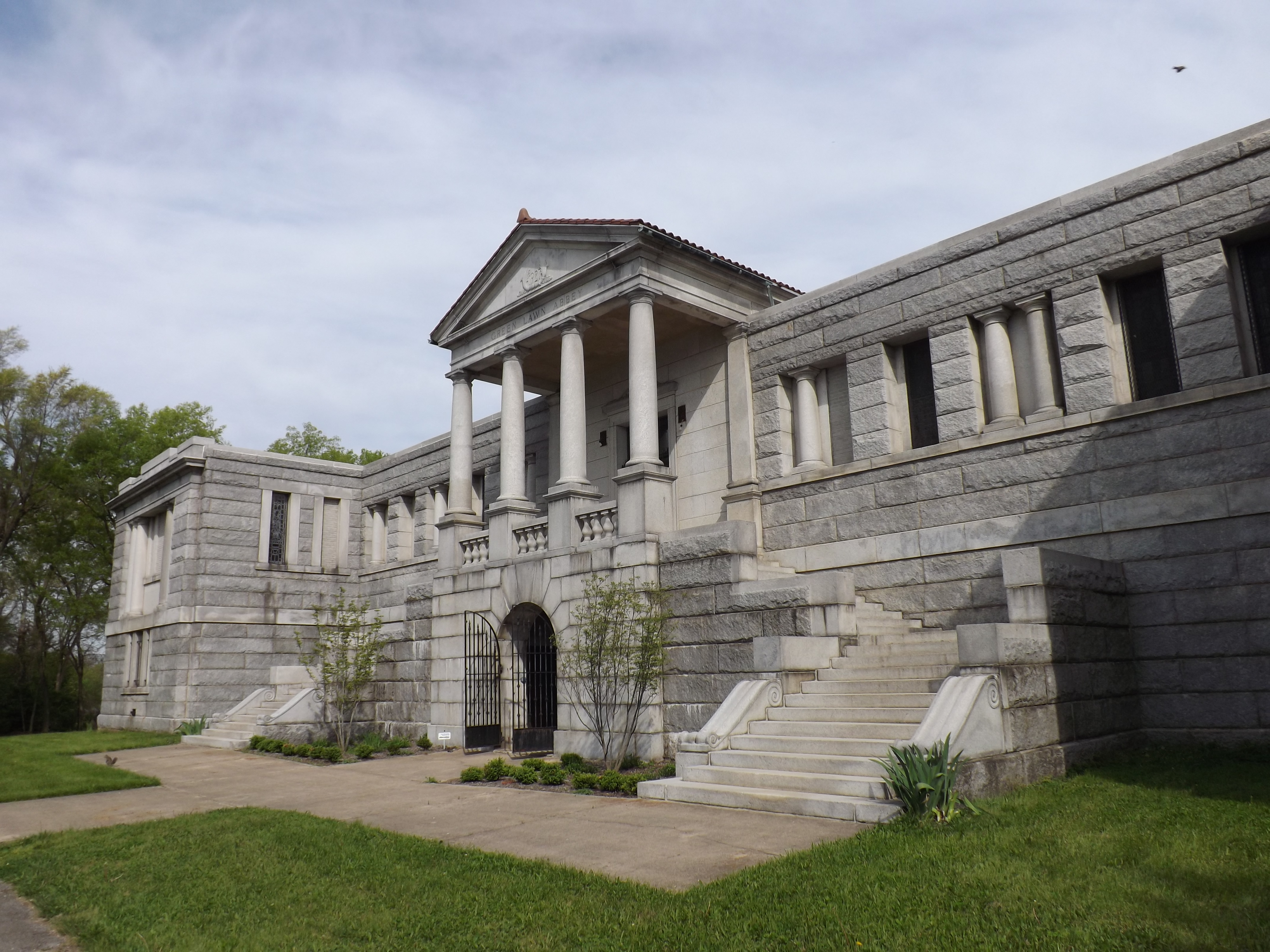
- Interactive map highlighting the building's location
- Location: Columbus, Ohio
- Coordinates: 39°56′26″N 83°0′58″W
- Built: 1927
- Architect: Columbus Mausoleum Co.
- Architectural style: Classical Revival
- NRHP reference No.: 07000632
- Added to NRHP: June 27, 2007

Green Lawn Abbey is a mausoleum in Franklin Township, Ohio, United States, constructed in 1927. Located at 700 Greenlawn Avenue, it was listed in the National Register of Historic Places in 2007 for its Palladio-inspired neoclassical architecture..

== History ==
Built in 1927 by the Columbus Mausoleum Company, Green Lawn Abbey was the largest mausoleum in the area at the time, with space for 600 interments, and it remains one of the largest mausoleums in central Ohio.

The abbey was finished with 1.5-inch (38 mm) thick granite on the exterior, white marble on the interior and an imported tile roof. It has marble faux-fireplaces, around 100 stained-glass windows, and various religious statues. It listed in the National Register of Historic Places in 2007 for its Palladio-inspired neoclassical architecture.

Notable interments include George J. Karb, Howard Thurston, and Isaac Collins. A special crypt houses members of the Lewis Sells family.

== Restoration efforts ==
In the late 20th Century, the Abbey fell victim to neglect and vandalism. In 2001, trustees for Green Lawn Abbey considered selling its grounds to a nearby construction implement dealer. The sale did not take place, but concern for the future of the Abbey led to the formation of the Green Lawn Abbey Preservation Association (GLAPA), incorporated as a 501(c)(3) recognized non-profit organization in August 2008. GLAPA has since raised over $750,000, funding preservation initiatives including roof replacement, foundation repair, bronze door restoration, repair or replacement of 13 stained glass windows, and landscape improvements.

== See also ==
- Green Lawn Cemetery, Columbus, Ohio, nearby but not related
- Category: Burials at Green Lawn Abbey
