= Sells Brothers Circus =

Former circus

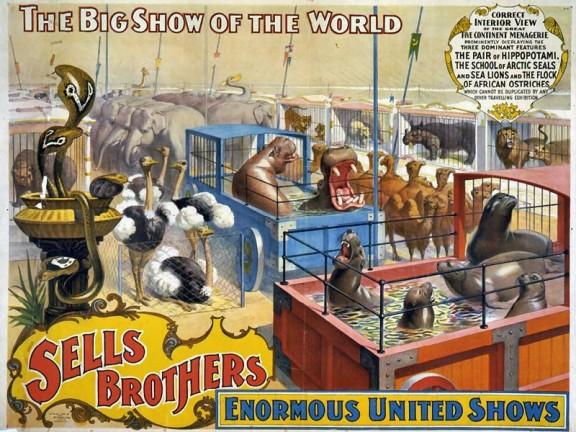

Origin
- Founder(s): Ephraim, William, Lewis and Peter Sells

Information
- Fate: Merged with Floto Dog & Pony Show into the Sells Floto Circus

Sells Brothers Circus was a circus founded by Ephraim, William, Lewis, and Peter Sells in Columbus, Ohio, United States.

== History ==
The circus, more formally known as the Sells Brothers' Quadruple Alliance, Museum, Menagerie, Caravan and Circus, ran from 1862 to 1863 and again from 1871 to 1895. The circus was based out of Columbus, Ohio in an area that was known as Sellsville in Clinton Township along the Olentangy River near King Avenue. Sellsville was of considerable size, and many animals and staff lived in the area during the off seasons. It merged with the circus operated by Adam Forepaugh to form the Forepaugh-Sells Brothers' Circus in 1900. It later merged with the Floto Dog & Pony Show to become the Sells Floto Circus.

The 1901 silent film Day at the Circus by Edison Manufacturing Company features a parade and horse race from the circus.

== See also ==
- The Circus House, located in Columbus, Ohio
- Charles Mayer, an elephant trainer and animal collector for the circus
