= Northside =

Northside or North Side may refer to:

== Music ==
- Northside (band), a musical group from Manchester, EngIand
- NorthSide, an American record label
- NorthSide Festival (Denmark), a music festival in Aarhus, Denmark
- "Norf Norf", a 2015 song by Vince Staples

== Places ==
=== Canada ===
- Northside, Saskatchewan
- Northside East Bay, Nova Scotia
- North Side, Newfoundland and Labrador

=== United States ===
- Northside, Atlantic City, historical name of the predominantly Black Westside neighborhood in Atlantic City
- North Side, California, former name of Oildale, California
- Northside, Berkeley, California
- Northside, Long Beach, California
- North Side, Chicago, Illinois
- Northside (East Chicago), Indiana
- Northside (Jacksonville), a region in Jacksonville, Florida
- Northside, Lexington, a neighborhood in northern Lexington, Kentucky
- Northside, Paterson, a neighborhood in Paterson New Jersey
- North Side, Binghamton, a neighborhood of Binghamton, New York
- Northside, Syracuse, New York
- Northside, Cincinnati, Ohio
- North Side (Pittsburgh), Pennsylvania
- North Side, Waco, Texas, a neighborhood of Waco, Texas
- Northside, Houston, a district of Houston, Texas
- North Side, U.S. Virgin Islands, a settlement on the island of Saint Croix
- Northside, Saint Thomas, U.S. Virgin Islands, an administrative census subdistrict on Saint Thomas
- North Side (Richmond, Virginia)

=== Other places ===
- North Side, Anguilla, a district in Anguilla
- North Side, Cayman Islands
- North Side, Birtley, Tyne and Wear, England
- Northside, a district of the town of Workington, England
- Northside, Dublin, Ireland

== Schools ==
- Northside Christian School (North Charleston, SC), United States
- Northside High School (disambiguation)
- Northside Middle School (disambiguation)
- Northside High School (Columbus, GA), United States

== Other uses ==
- North Side Inc, software company
- North Side SC, a football club in George Town, Cayman Islands
- Northside (Metrorail station), Miami, Florida

== See also ==
- Near North Side (disambiguation)
- North Side Historic District (disambiguation)
- North Side station (disambiguation)
- Northside Historic District (disambiguation)
