= Brie Ruais =

American artist

Brie Ruais is an American artist based in Brooklyn, New York, working in large “multi-faceted” ceramic sculptures, performance, photography, video, and site-specific installation.

Ruais’ work is a process-oriented, performative, body-conscious strain of feminist sculpture and addresses themes such as the environment, eco-feminism, feminist theory, and embodiment. Her work falls in the lineage of body-based conceptual artists Janine Antoni, Bruce Nauman, Lynda Benglis, and Eleanor Antin; artists whose work engages with the land such as Michelle Stuart, Ana Mendieta, and Richard Long; as well as the gestural athleticism of action painting and Richard Serra’s lead performances. Her work has also been compared to artists whose work is influenced by their natural surroundings like Georgia O'Keeffe and Agnes Martin.

== Early life ==
Ruais was born in 1982 in Southern California. She received her BS in Studio Art from New York University Steinhardt School in 2004. She received her MFA from the School of the Arts at Columbia University in 2011, where she studied with Jon Kessler.

== Work ==
Ruais’s abstract ceramic sculptures retain both the primordial, earthen origins of clay as well as the physical and psychological imprint of their maker. Working on the floor, Ruais begins her work with a predetermined set of actions and an amount of clay that often equals her own bodyweight. The titles of her work reference the gestures she performs, like “spreading out from center,” “compressing,” “pushing landscape,” and “making space from the inside.” Her process is highly physical and it is performed quickly from beginning to end, utilizing her entire body. She is described as kicking, spreading, scraping, and skimming, cinching, ramming, and shoving the material across the floor or up a wall. The resulting form is then cut into segments, glazed, fired, and hung on the wall. The finished sculpture is embedded with the marks of this process: “whorled and rutted from fingers, elbows and boot treads”. The sculptures are topographical documents of the performance that formed them. Ruais’ work explores both the limits of the body and the material.

Ruais is known for her circular wall works that measure on average 80 inches (2 meters) in diameter. The sculptures are made on the floor and then hung vertically on the wall. They resemble clocks, starbursts, ray-like forms, punctures, and wounds. In Scraped Away from Center, 130lbs (Night) (2018), for example, the pigmented stoneware extends outward from the center, where Ruais knelt to make it, into a circular form with jagged edges.

== Books ==
Brie Ruais’ work is included in Phaidon’s Vitamin C: Clay + Ceramic, a global survey of 100 of today's most important clay and ceramic artists, chosen by leading art world professionals, published in 2017.

== Exhibitions ==
- 2024 Brie Ruais: Bone Dice, Albertz Benda, New York, NY
- 2024 Brie Ruais: Oneness, Contemporary Craft, Pittsburgh, PA
- 2021 Movement on the Edge of the Land, Moody Center for the Arts at Rice University, Houston, TX
- 2021 Taking Space: Contemporary Women Artists and the Politics of Scale, Pennsylvania Academy of the Fine Arts, Philadelphia, PA
- 2021 This is America, Kunstraum Potsdam, Berlin, Germany
- 2021 This Earth: Notes and Observations From Montello Foundation Artists, The Southern Utah Museum of Art, Cedar City, UT
- 2020 Formed and Fired: Contemporary American Ceramics, The Anderson Collection, Stanford University, Stanford, CA
- 2020 The Body, The Object, The Other, Craft Contemporary, Los Angeles, CA
- 2020 Afterimages, Musée d’art de Joliette, Joliette, Québec, Canada
- 2019 Earth Piece, Everson Museum of Art, Syracuse, NY
- 2019 America Will Be!: Surveying the Contemporary Landscape, Dallas Museum of Art, Dallas, Texas
- 2019 Intimate Immensity, Pennsylvania Academy of the Fine Arts, Philadelphia, PA
- 2019 The Form Will Find its Way: Contemporary Ceramic Sculptural Abstraction, The Katherine E. Nash Gallery at the Regis Center for Art, University of Minnesota, Minneapolis, MN
- 2017 New Ruins, American University Museum at the Katzen Arts Center, Washington DC
- 2015 Crafted: Objects in Flux, Museum of Fine Arts Boston, Boston, MA
- 2015 The Familiar and the Indefinable in Clay: The Scripps 71st Ceramic Annual, Ruth Chandler Williamson Gallery, Claremont, CA
- 2014 EAF14 Exhibition, Socrates Sculpture Park, Long Island City, NY
- 2013 Vessels, The Horticulture Society of New York, New York, NY
- 2011 BYTS Bosch Young Talent Show, Stedelijk Museum, ‘s-Hertogenbosch, The Netherlands

== Awards ==
- 2021 Virginia A. Groot Foundation Grant, First Place
- 2018 Pollock-Krasner Foundation Grant
- 2017 Sharpe-Walentas Studio Program, NY, NY
- 2017 Montello Foundation Residency, Montello, Nevada
- 2016 Dieu Donne, Workspace Program Residency, NY, NY

== Collections ==
Ruais' work is in the public collections of the Dallas Museum of Art, Dallas, TX, Matamoros Art In Embassies Collection, Mexico, Burger Collection, Hong Kong, Pizzuti Collection, Columbus, OH, and Pennsylvania Academy of the Fine Arts, Philadelphia, PA.
