= Northside Historic District =

Northside Historic District or North Side Historic District may refer to:

== United States ==
- Northside Historic District (Opelika, Alabama), listed on the National Register of Historic Places (NRHP) in Lee County
- Northside Historic Residential District, Lexington, Kentucky, NRHP-listed in Fayette County
- North Side Historic District (Peoria, Illinois), NRHP-listed in Peoria County
- Old Northside Historic District, Indianapolis, Indiana
- Martinsville Northside Historic District, Martinsville, Indiana
- Plymouth Northside Historic District, Plymouth, Indiana
- Northside Village Historic District, Charlton, Massachusetts
- Northside Historic District (Yarmouth, Massachusetts)
- Great Falls Northside Residential Historic District, Great Falls, Montana NRHP-listed in Cascade County
- Northside Missoula Railroad Historic District, NRHP-listed in Missoula County
- Northside Historic District (Elizabeth City, North Carolina)
- Northside Historic District (Waterford, New York)
- Near Northside Historic District (Columbus, Ohio), NRHP-listed in Columbus
- Brownsville Northside Historic District, Brownsville, Pennsylvania
- Near North Side Historic District (Houston, Texas), NRHP-listed in inner Harris County
- North Side Historic District (Palestine, Texas), NRHP-listed in Anderson County
- Northside Historic District of Cream Brick Workers' Cottages, Racine, NRHP-listed in Racine County, Wisconsin

== See also ==
- Near Northside Historic District (disambiguation)
