= Fifth by Northwest =

Neighborhood in Columbus, Ohio

Fifth By Northwest
- Neighborhood in Columbus, Ohio
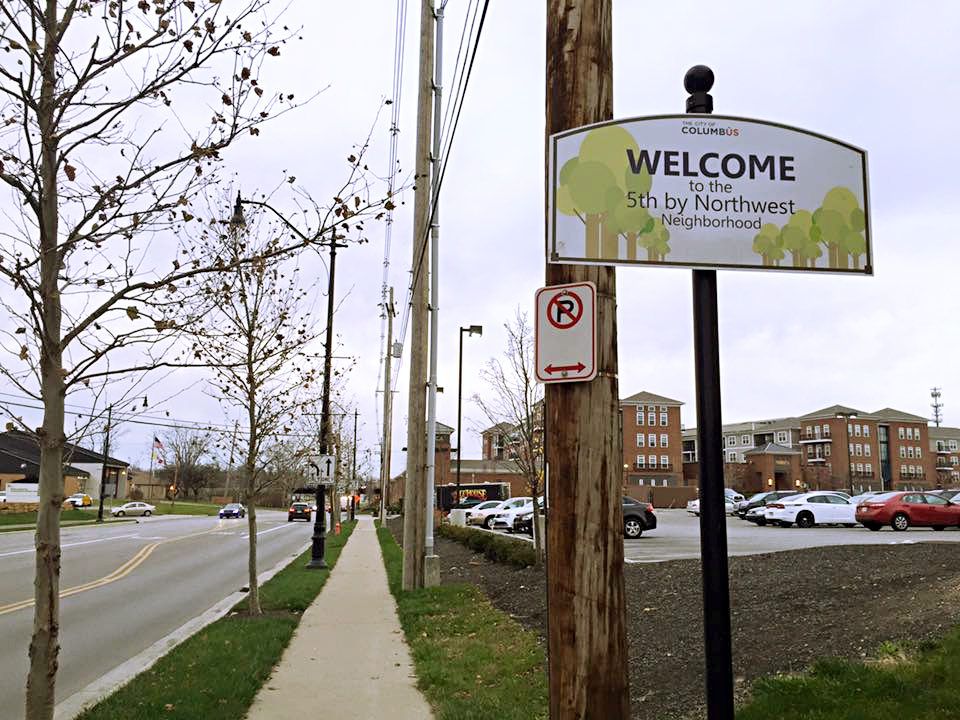
- Interactive map of Fifth By Northwest
- Coordinates: 39°59′26.0592″N 83°2′31.8552″W

Population (2011)
  - Total: 6,695
- Postal code: 43212
- Website: http://www.fifthbynorthwest.org/

Fifth by Northwest is a neighborhood in Columbus, Ohio. Covering about 700 acres (280 ha), Fifth by Northwest is approximately bound by Glenn Avenue, Wyandotte Road, & Kinnear to the north, Third Avenue to the south, Kenny Road and Olentangy River Road to the east and Northstar Road to the west. Also sometimes referred to as 5XNW or the Tri-Village area, Fifth by Northwest is just north of Grandview Heights, northwest of the Harrison West neighborhood, and west of The Ohio State University.

== Etymology ==
Fifth by Northwest derives its name from the primary intersection of the two main crossroads in the center of the neighborhood, specifically Fifth Avenue and Northwest Boulevard

== History ==
Prior to settlement by Europeans, 5xNW was inhabited by Native Americans, possibly as far back as 300 BC. Archaeological evidence suggests that members of the Wyandotte Tribe may have inhabited the area as recently as 1730 to 1750. Upon European settlement, Lucas Sullivant surveyed and sold the land to immigrants in the area, most of whom were Canadian refugees that had fled British Imperial Canada and allied themselves with the US during the Revolutionary War.

Though it was initially farm and grazing land, the development of 5xNW, as well as its surrounding areas, was greatly expedited by the creation of the railroad system, catalyzing the area's popularity with major industrial rail lines and a streetcar connecting the area to Downtown Columbus. Furthermore, the Marble Cliff Quarry and the Sells Brothers Circus were major economic engines sustaining the development of the area. The economic growth of the area continued as residents, visitors, and tourists patronized the Grandview "Bank Block" upon its opening in 1927. Established by developer Don Casto, the "Bank Block" was the first shopping center of its kind in the area. In 1922, the 5xNW neighborhood and its surrounding areas were annexed by the city of Columbus.

5xNW was established as a Columbus neighborhood in a more official capacity with the creation of the Fifth by Northwest Area Commission, founded as the result of a successful grass roots effort undertaken in 2005.

=== Fifth by Northwest Area Commission ===
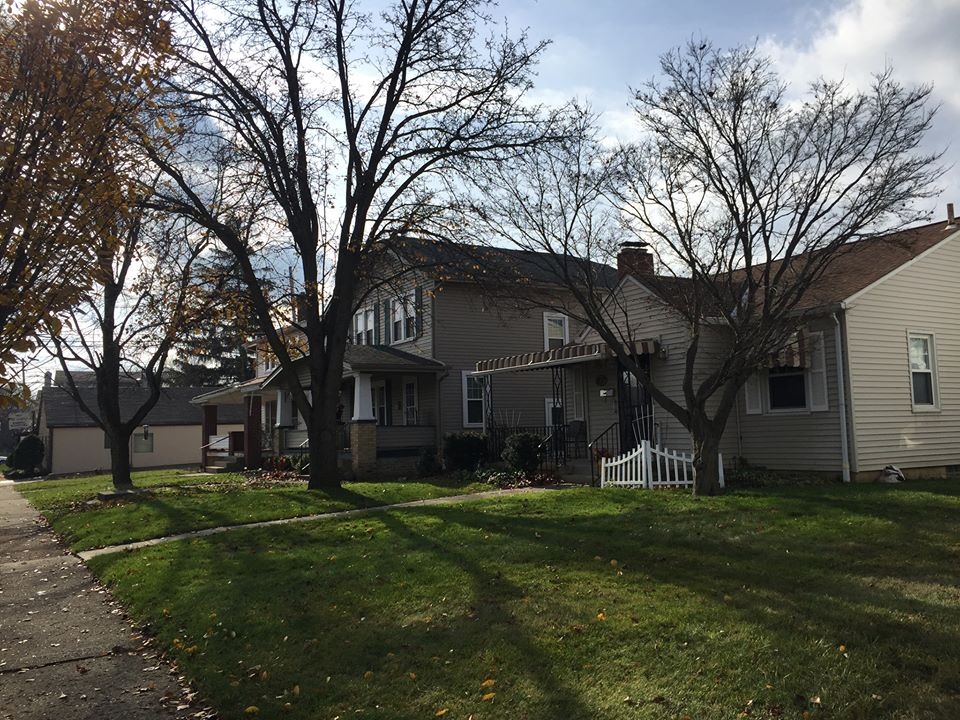
Single-family homes in 5xNW

Originally designated as the North Grandview Area Commission (NGAC), the name of the organization was ultimately changed to The Fifth by Northwest Area Commission in reference to the primary intersection of two main crossroads (5th Avenue and Northwest Boulevard) in the heart of the neighborhood. This designation was created in lieu of a term referring to the corridor connecting central Columbus to the City of Grandview.

The Fifth by Northwest Area Commission describes themselves as the official, grassroots liaison to Columbus City Council on behalf of neighborhood residents and property owners, local businesses, and developers of the neighborhood. The commission advocates on issues related to basic neighborhood infrastructure as well as the continued development of the area in a way that is sustainable and modern, while still maintaining the neighborhood's historic charm. They also manage a number of community projects including the neighborhood's biking initiative and community gardens. Commission meetings are open to the public and are held the first Tuesday of every month at St. Luke's Church on Fifth Avenue.

== Geography and landmarks ==
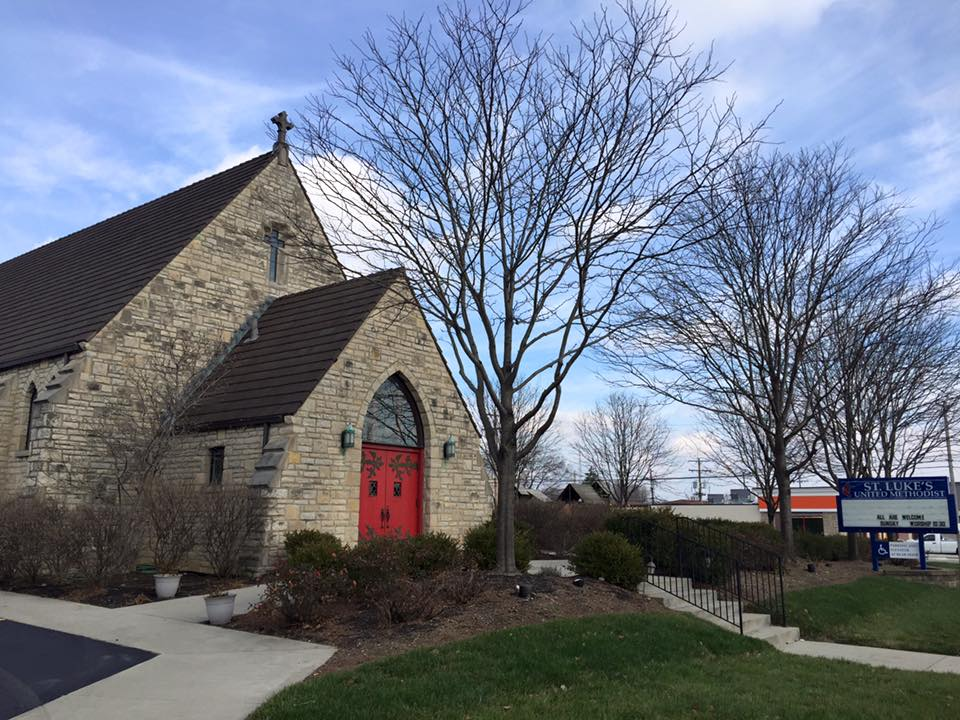
St. Luke's Church in 5xNW

Covering about 700 acres, 5xNW is approximately bound by Third Avenue to the south, Glenn Avenue, Wyandotte Road, and Northstar Road to the west, Kinnear to the north, and Kenny Road and Olentangy River Road to the east. While these are listed as being the established boundaries for planning purposes with the City of Columbus, the perceived boundaries of the neighborhood overlap more with Grandview Heights to the south given the mixed-use development in the area, which is home to an eclectic conglomeration of shops, restaurants, and sidewalk cafes. Adjacent neighborhoods to 5xNW include Grandview Heights, Upper Arlington, Harrison West, Marble Cliff, and the University District.

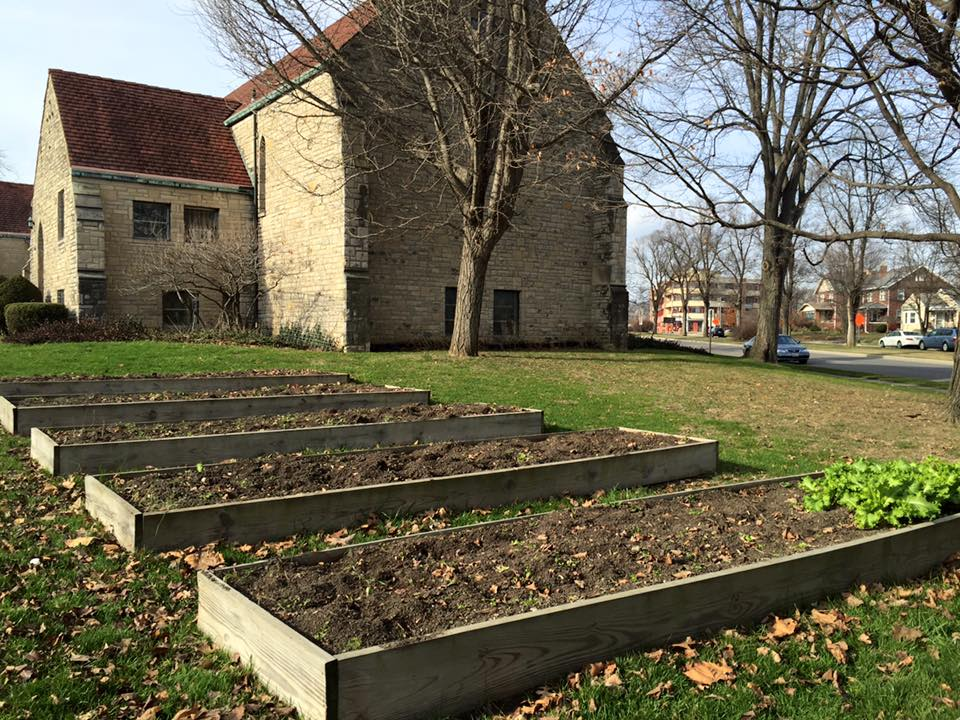
Community garden in 5xNW

=== Landmarks ===
Many of the landmarks in 5xNW overlap with Grandview Heights. For instance, Grandview Avenue is a major thoroughfare in the area, with many shops and restaurants designed with walkability in mind. St. Christopher's Catholic Church is another major landmark that has been in the neighborhood for more than 50 years. Most of the congregation's 600 families live in the area and send nearly 170 children to the parish's Trinity Elementary School. St. Christopher also houses a bike shelter established by the Fifth by Northwest Area Commission. Another notable location would be Saint Luke's United Methodist Church as the 5xNW Area Commission meets there on the first Tuesday of every month.

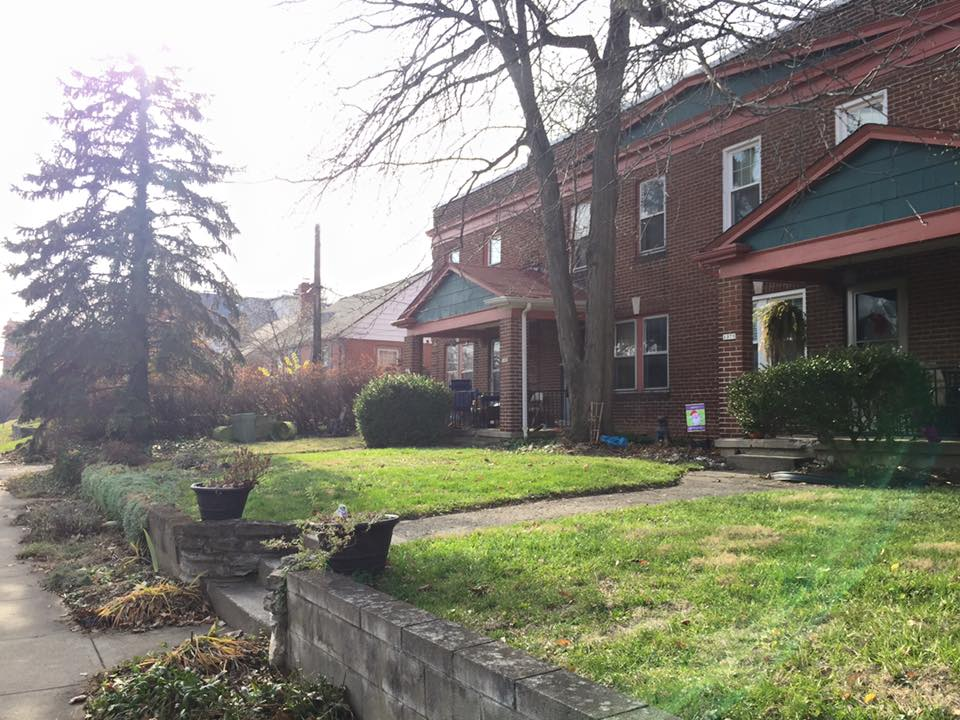
Multi-resident home in 5xNW

Located on the grounds of the Boulevard Presbyterian Church, the community garden is another instance of overlap between 5xNW and Grandview Heights. The 5xNW community garden was established via a grant awarded by the Scott's Miracle Gro/Columbus Foundation "Going Into Green" program in 2011. The produce from the garden is sourced to the community food bank run by the Presbyterian Church in downtown Columbus. The garden's raised beds were constructed by Green Columbus as a part of city-wide Earth Day celebrations. The garden is cared for on a continuous basis by members of the congregation at Boulevard Presbyterian Church.

Although there are no parks or open space for recreational use in the planning area, recreational areas are available close by in neighboring jurisdictions. One such area is the Olentangy Trail, which can be found to the east of the area. Additionally, a number of playgrounds and parks can be found nearby in Grandview Heights.

== Transportation ==
The highest flow of automobile traffic exists on two main thoroughfares in the 5xNW neighborhood; Olentangy River Road and Fifth Avenue. Major freeways in Columbus (SR-315, I-70, I-270, and I71) are also very easily accessible from this neighborhood, making the commute along the outer belt surrounding Columbus incredibly convenient. The Central Ohio Transit Authority (COTA) services a number of bus routes in the 5xNW neighborhood. Additionally, the 5xNW area is bordered by the Olentangy River Trail to the east, a popular attraction for hikers and bikers. Bike lanes have also been established on King Avenue, one of the major thoroughfares in the neighborhood, in an effort to make 5xNW even more navigable without an automobile.

== Land use ==
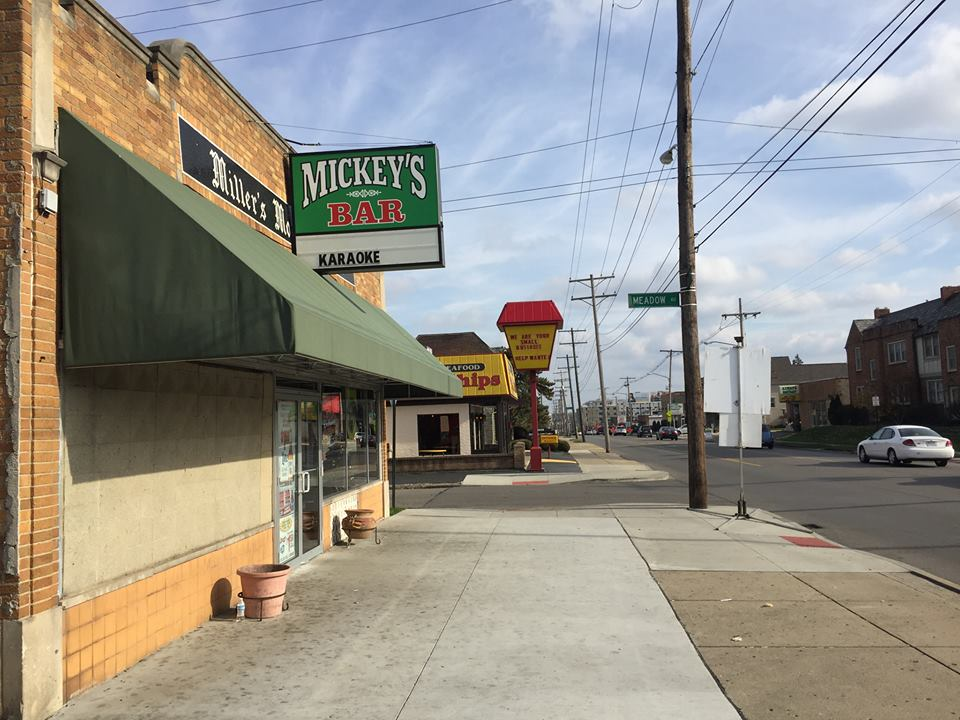
Commercial area in 5xNW

5xNW is zoned for mixed use by the planning commission in the City of Columbus. The Fifth by Northwest Area Commission describes the neighborhood as "featuring a vibrant mix of traditional and urban housing intertwined with a variety of easily walkable commercial establishments distributed throughout the area." Fifth Avenue is zoned largely for commercial use whereas Third Avenue and King Avenue have both areas of commercial zoning mixed with single family, multifamily, residential and manufacturing zoning, though the majority is residential and multi-family.

The City of Columbus has designated Fifth by Northwest as a "market ready" Community Reinvestment Area, with available 15-year, 100 percent tax abatements if projects include 10 percent affordable housing, with options to buy out of the requirement.

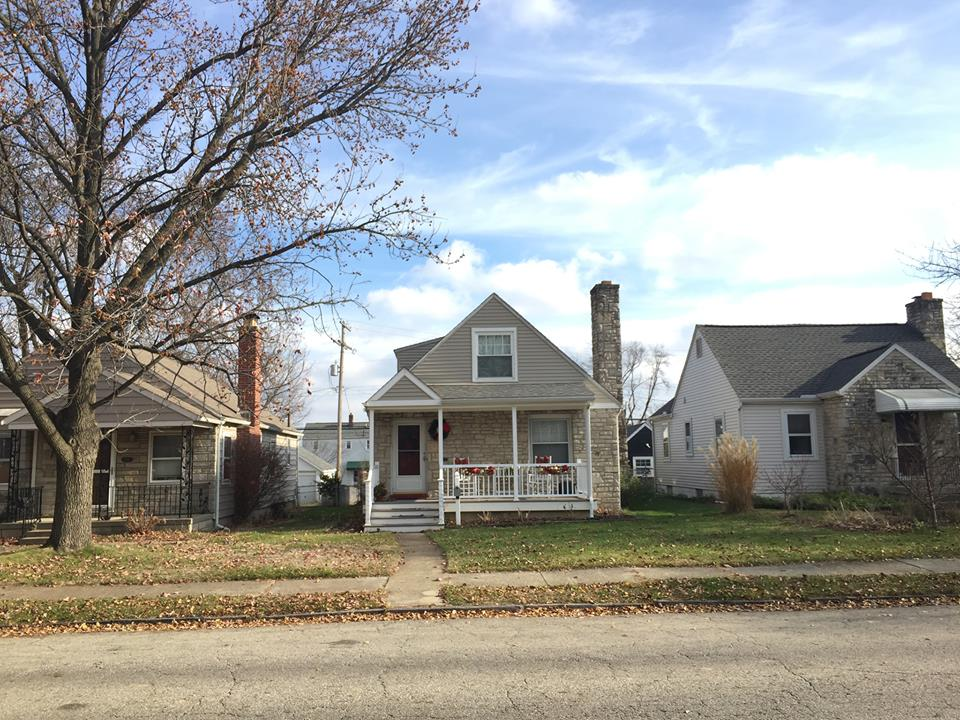
Residential property (single family homes) in 5xNW

=== Residential ===
Many of the building spaces in the area are apartment style complexes with multiple individual renters inside of them. Though some of the houses are individual and others not both styles are set back off the road by about 25 feet with 10 feet in between them and another house/unit. The average house price is around $167,800 with a median household income of between: $31,026 - $37,568. Residential development in the area is ongoing. After a fire in 2009 that devastated a number of businesses on Grandview Avenue, including the Kingswood building (a two-story retail structure), the Columbus-based Wagenbrenner Co. redeveloped the site with the four-story mixed residential and commercial complex known as the Windsor Building which opened in early 2011. Also in 2011, the Edwards Development Co. began construction on a 190- to 205-unit luxury apartment complex near Grandview Heights on 3rd Avenue known as the Tribeca, which opened in 2012.

=== Commercial ===
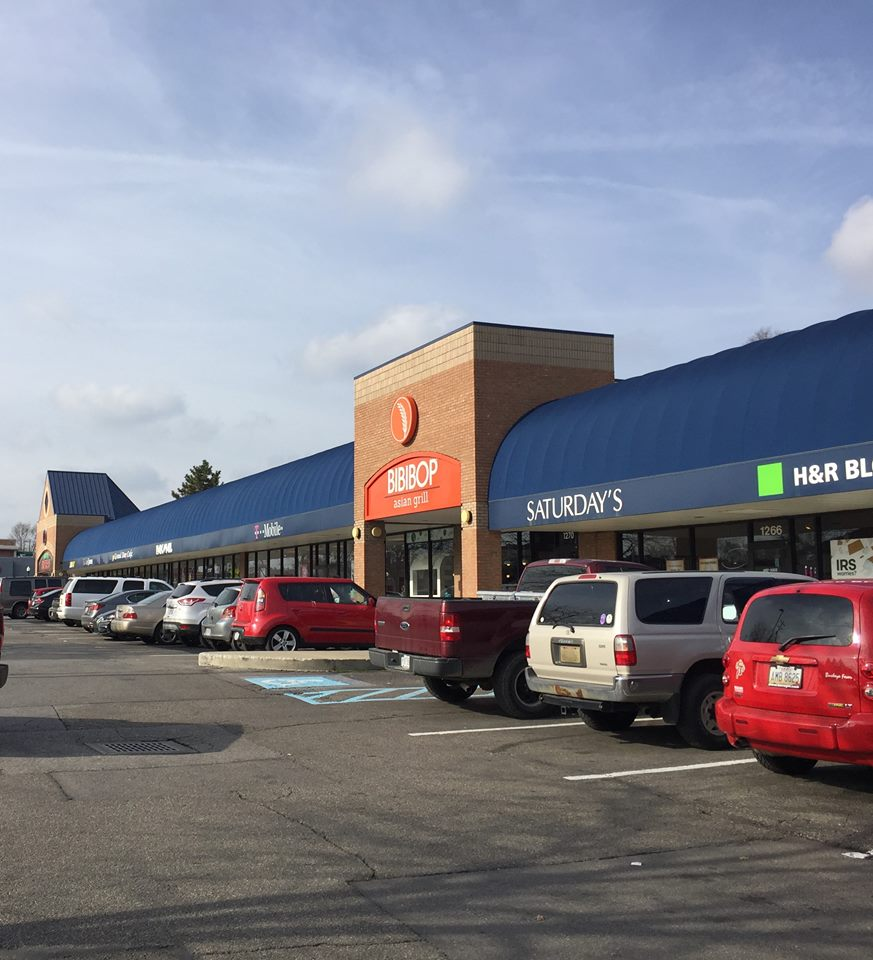
Walkable commercial area in 5xNW

The 5xNW neighborhood has seen a great deal of commercial development in recent years, with an emphasis on maintaining the walkability and "neighborhood feel" of the area, as it appeals to millennials and "empty-nesters", according to the Fifth by Northwest Area Commission. The majority of commercial uses are located on Fifth Avenue, Grandview Avenue, King Avenue and Third Avenue with a number of multi-family housing being located throughout this planning area (particularly to the North of King Ave.).

Community institutions such as schools and churches can be found throughout the area as well. Although it overlaps with the Grandview Heights neighborhood, Grandview Avenue is home to a diverse thoroughfare populated with a number of shops, restaurants, and sidewalk cafes including Jeni's Ice Cream, Stauf's Coffee Roasters, and other favorites among Columbus natives.

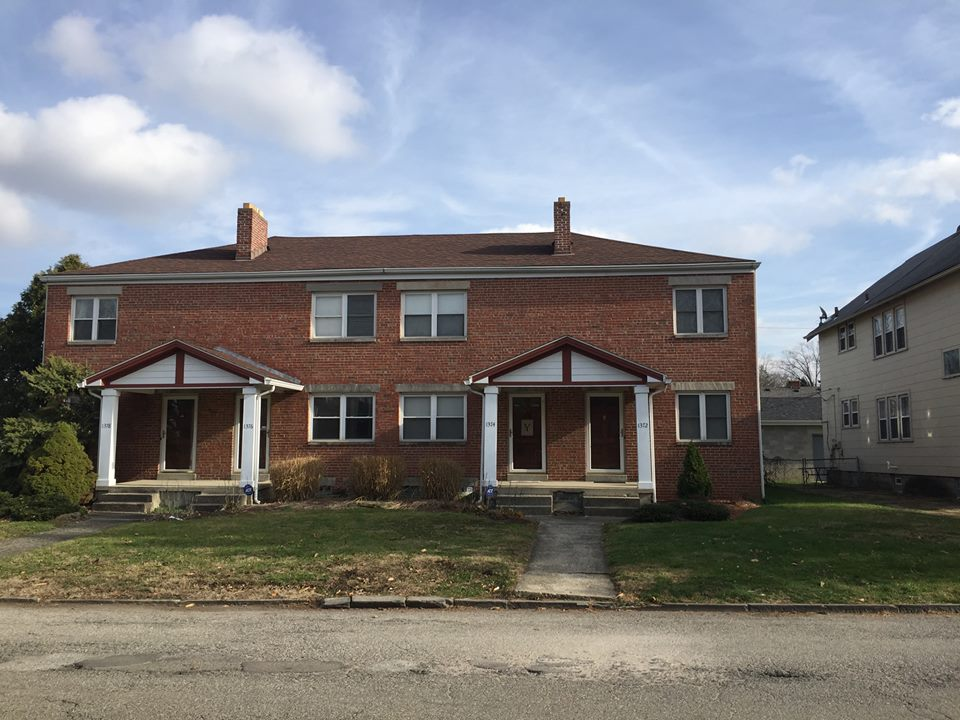
Multi-resident home in 5xNW

The Lennox Town Center is also a major commercial shopping center, located just to the north of the 5xNW neighborhood, along Olentangy River Road, occupied by a number of franchise retail stores, restaurants, and a movie theater.

== Demographics ==
Category	Census Tract 19.02: 3rd, Northwest - Wyandotte	Census Tract 78.30: Kinnear, Chambers, Olentany - Northstar	Total
Population	3,410 (2010)	2,719 (2010)	6,129 (2010)
Race	White: 90.1%, Hispanic: 2.9%, Black: 2.7%, Asian: 4%, Other: 3.2%	White: 79.1%, Hispanic: 3.8%, Black: 4%, Asian: 12.4%, Other: 4.4%	White: 84.6%, Hispanic: 3.35%, Black: 3.35%, Asian: 8.2%, Other: 3.8%
Housing Units	2,566	1,889	4,455
Median Household Income	$37,586	$31,026	$34,306
Median House Price	$192,100	$143,500	$167,800
Population Density	8,167.81/sq. mile	6,258.72/sq. mile	7,163.265/sq. mile
