= Near Northside Historic District =

Near Northside Historic District or Near North Side Historic District may refer to:

- Near Northside Historic District (Columbus, Ohio), listed on the National Register of Historic Places (NRHP)
- Near North Side Historic District (Houston, Texas), NRHP-listed in inner Harris County

== See also ==
- Near North Side, Chicago, historic neighborhood which includes several historic districts
- Northside Historic District (disambiguation) (covers "Northside" and "North Side" historic districts)
