= Northside Historic District (Yarmouth, Massachusetts) =

Historic district in Massachusetts, United States

- U.S. National Register of Historic Places
- U.S. Historic district
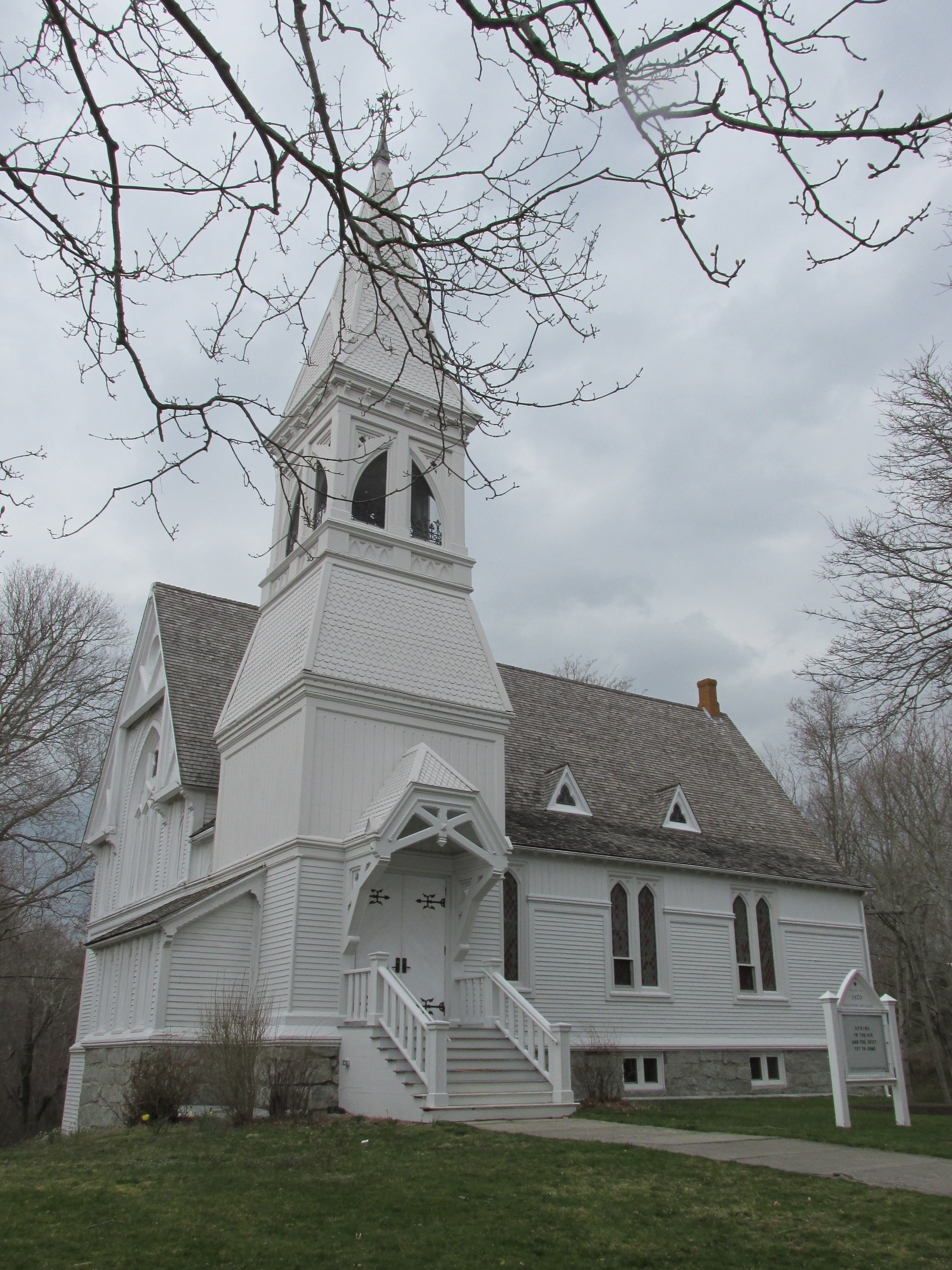
- The New Church, 1870

- Location within Cape Cod Location within Massachusetts Location within the United States
- Location: Yarmouth, Massachusetts
- Coordinates: 41°42′10″N 70°14′45″W
- Architect: Multiple
- Architectural style: Greek Revival, Georgian, Federal
- NRHP reference No.: 87001777
- Added to NRHP: November 24, 1987

The Northside Historic District encompasses two of the earliest significant settlement areas of Yarmouth, Massachusetts. Stretching along Massachusetts Route 6A from the Barnstable line in the west to White Brook in the east, the district includes almost 300 buildings on 50 acres (20 ha). It includes the two villages of Yarmouth Center and Yarmouthport, which were important 18th and 19th century centers of civic and economic activity.

Although the district includes a number of early colonial First Period structures (the oldest being the c.1680 Colonel John Thacher House), the majority of its buildings date between 1780 and 1860, and are either Federal or Greek Revival in character. There are a number of important early Cape-style homes in the district; these are typically smaller single story buildings, where the later buildings have larger floor plans and are two stories or two and a half stories in height. There are a modest number of houses in styles popular in the second half of the 19th century, including a Gothic Revival house at 134 Hallett Street and Italianate houses at 282 and 364 Hallett.

Institutional buildings in the district include three churches, all from the late 19th century; one of them, the First Congregational Church, dates its congregation to the establishment of Yarmouth's first meeting house in 1640. All three buildings are from the later decades of the 19th century. There are three civic buildings: two school buildings (the 1880 Queen Anne Sloyd Building, and the c. 1881 Colonial Revival Lyceum Hall), and the library, an 1870 Gothic Revival structure.

The district was listed on the National Register of Historic Places in 1987.

== See also ==
- South Yarmouth/Bass River Historic District
- National Register of Historic Places listings in Barnstable County, Massachusetts
