= First Avenue School (Columbus, Ohio) =

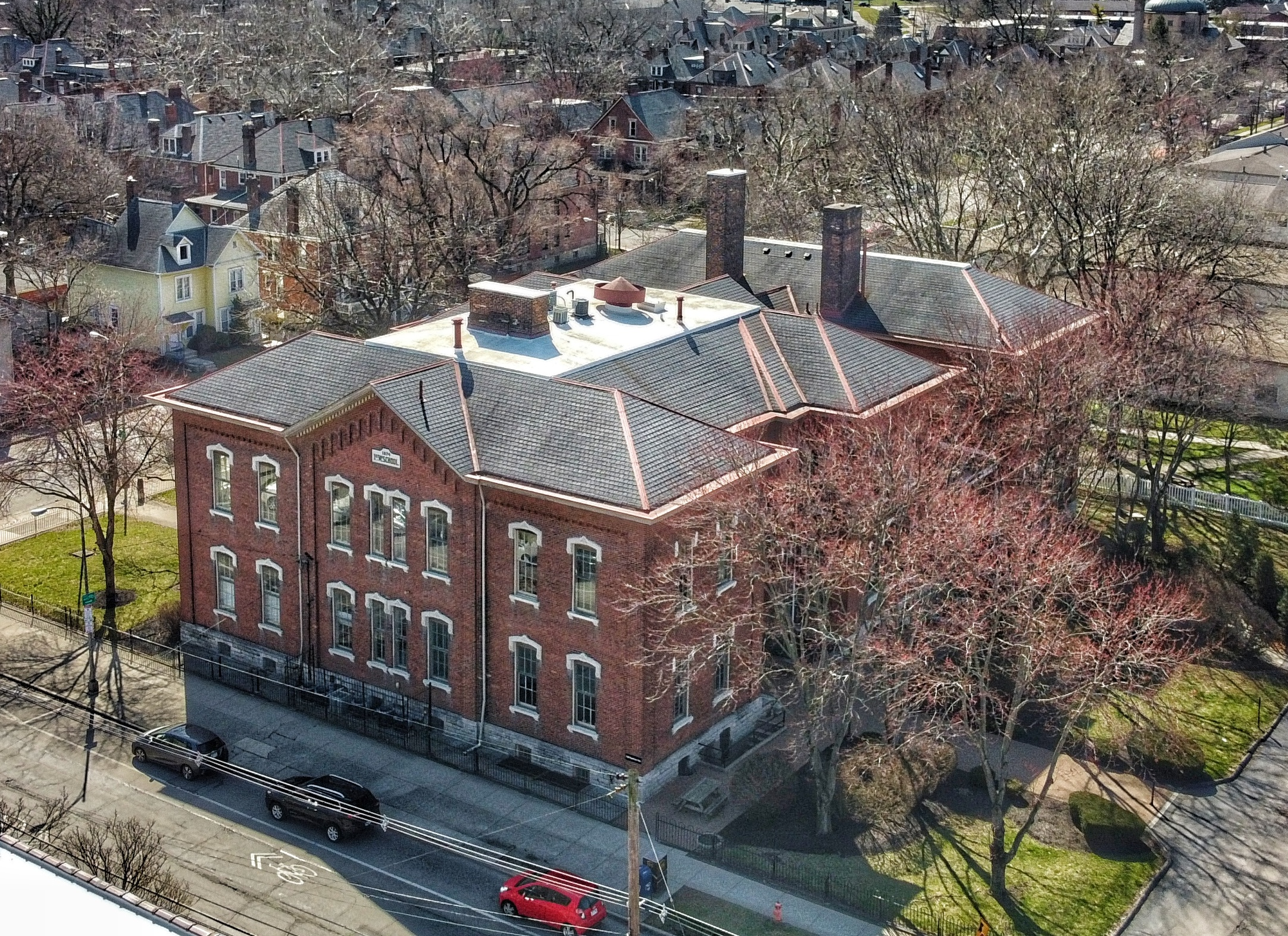

Location
- 929 Harrison Avenue; Columbus, Ohio; United States

Information
- Type: Public elementary school
- School district: Columbus
- First Avenue School
- U.S. Historic district – Contributing property
- Columbus Register of Historic Properties
- Interactive map highlighting the building's location
- Coordinates: 39.980322°N 83.014805°W
- Built: 1874
- Architect: David Riebel
- Architectural style: Romanesque Revival
- Part of: Near Northside Historic District (ID80003001)
- CRHP No.: CR-12
- Designated CRHP: January 10, 1983

The First Avenue School is a former public school building in the Harrison West neighborhood of Columbus, Ohio. It was listed on the Columbus Register of Historic Properties in 1983, and was listed as part of the Near Northside Historic District, on the National Register of Historic Places, in 1980.

== History ==
The building is one of the oldest in the neighborhood, built in 1874. It is also one of the oldest remaining school buildings in Columbus, built at the same time as the Second Avenue School and Stewart Alternative Elementary, also still extant. In 1984, Wood Development remodeled the building into the First Avenue Office Center at a cost of $1.2 million.

== Appearance ==
The Italianate structure has segmental arched windows, a wood cornice, hipped roof, and piers on the corner of each projection. The school's main entrance features a round arch with a brick keystone.

== Gallery ==
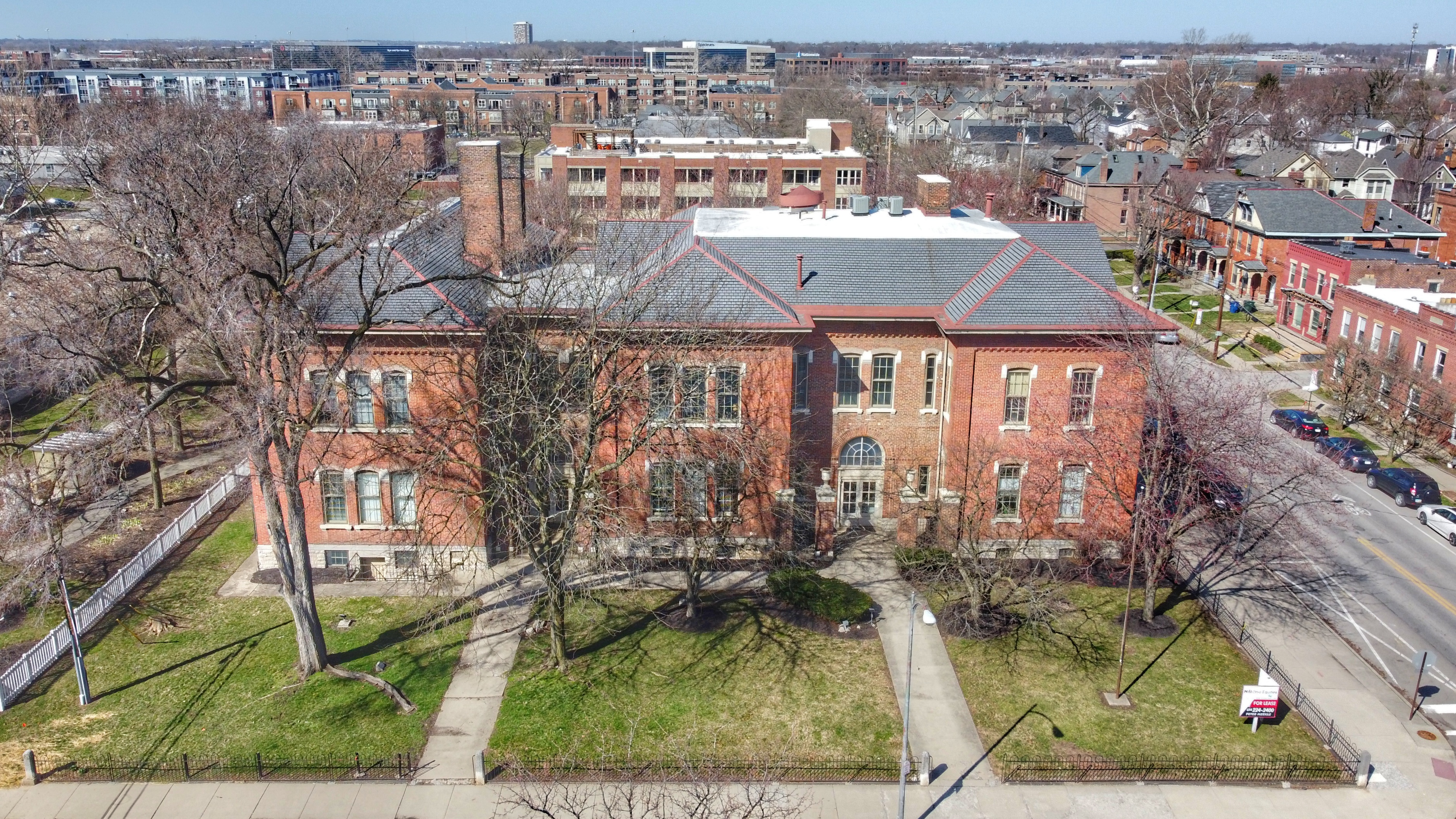
South facade

== See also ==
- National Register of Historic Places listings in Columbus, Ohio
- Schools in Columbus, Ohio
