= Northside, Lexington =

Coordinates: 38°03′N 84°29′W

Northside
- Neighborhood of Lexington, Kentucky
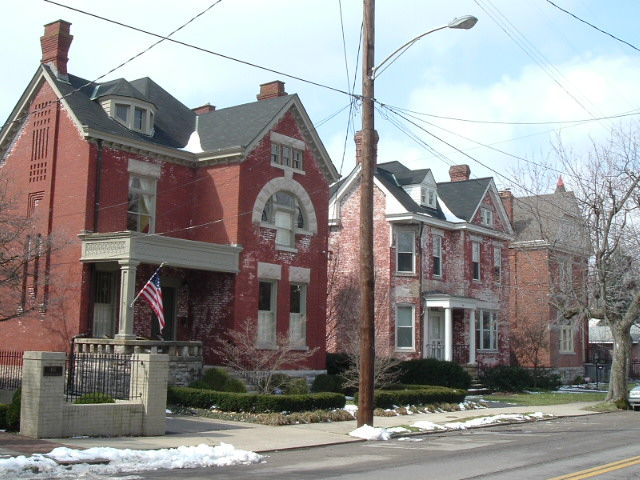
- A residential neighborhood in Lexington's Northside
- Interactive map of Northside
- Country: United States
- State: Kentucky
- County: Fayette
- City: Lexington

Area
  - Total: 0.57 sq mi (1.48 km^{2})

Population (2000)
  - Total: 3,875
  - Density: 6,781/sq mi (2,618.2/km^{2})
- Time zone: UTC-5 (Eastern (EST))
  - Summer (DST): UTC-4 (EDT)
- ZIP code: 40507, 40508
- Area code: 859

Northside is a neighborhood in northern Lexington, Kentucky, United States. Its boundaries are Loudon Avenue to the north and east, Short Street, Midland Avenue, and Winchester Road to the south, and Newtown Pike to the west.

== Neighborhood statistics ==
- Population in 2000: 3,875
- Land area: 0.572 square miles (1.48 km^{2})
- Population density: 6,774 people per square mile (2,615 people/km^{2})
- Median household income: $26,159

== Gallery ==
Numerous buildings and corridors in Lexington's Northside neighborhood are on the National Register of Historic Places, including:

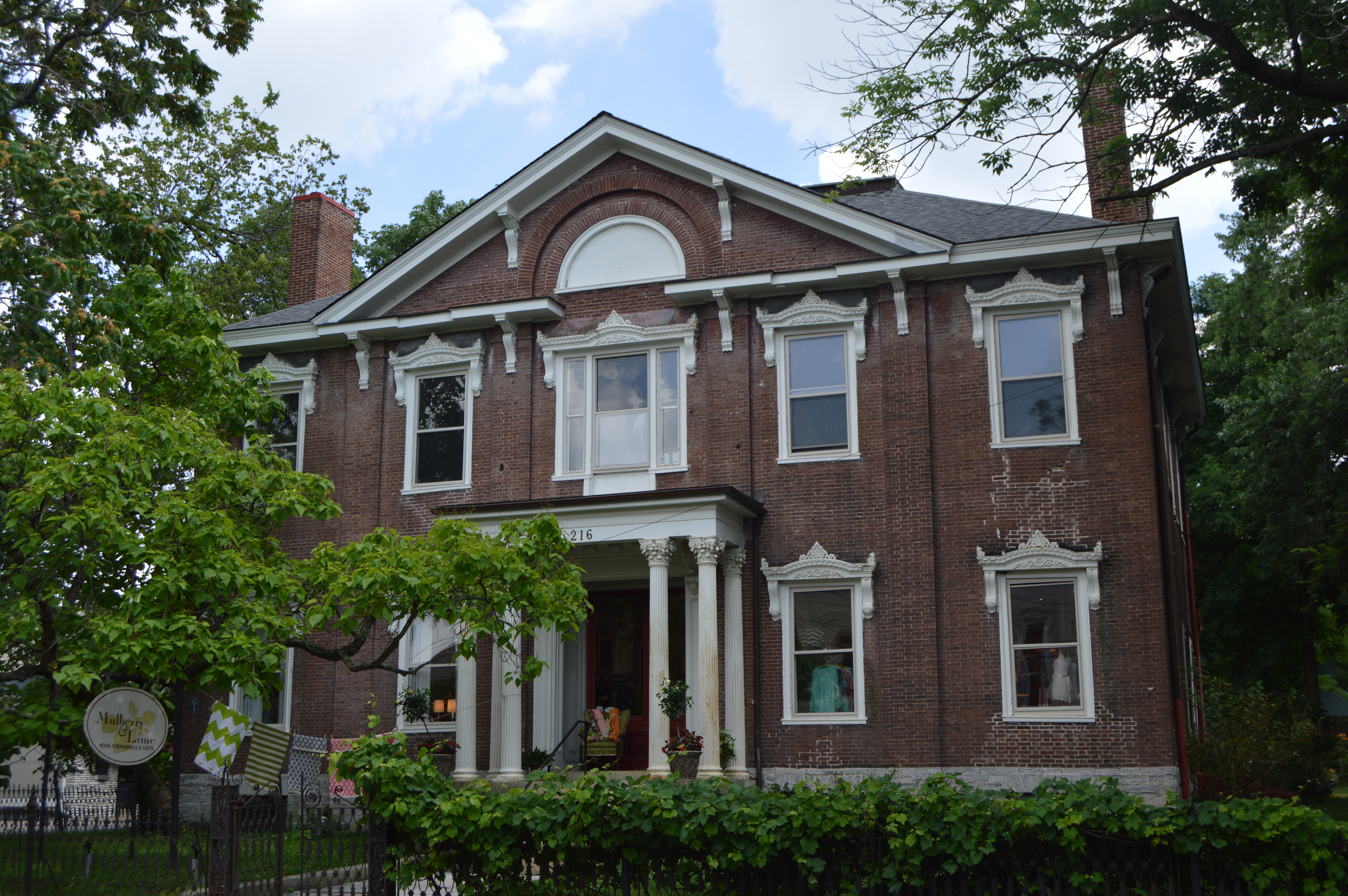
Matthew Kennedy House

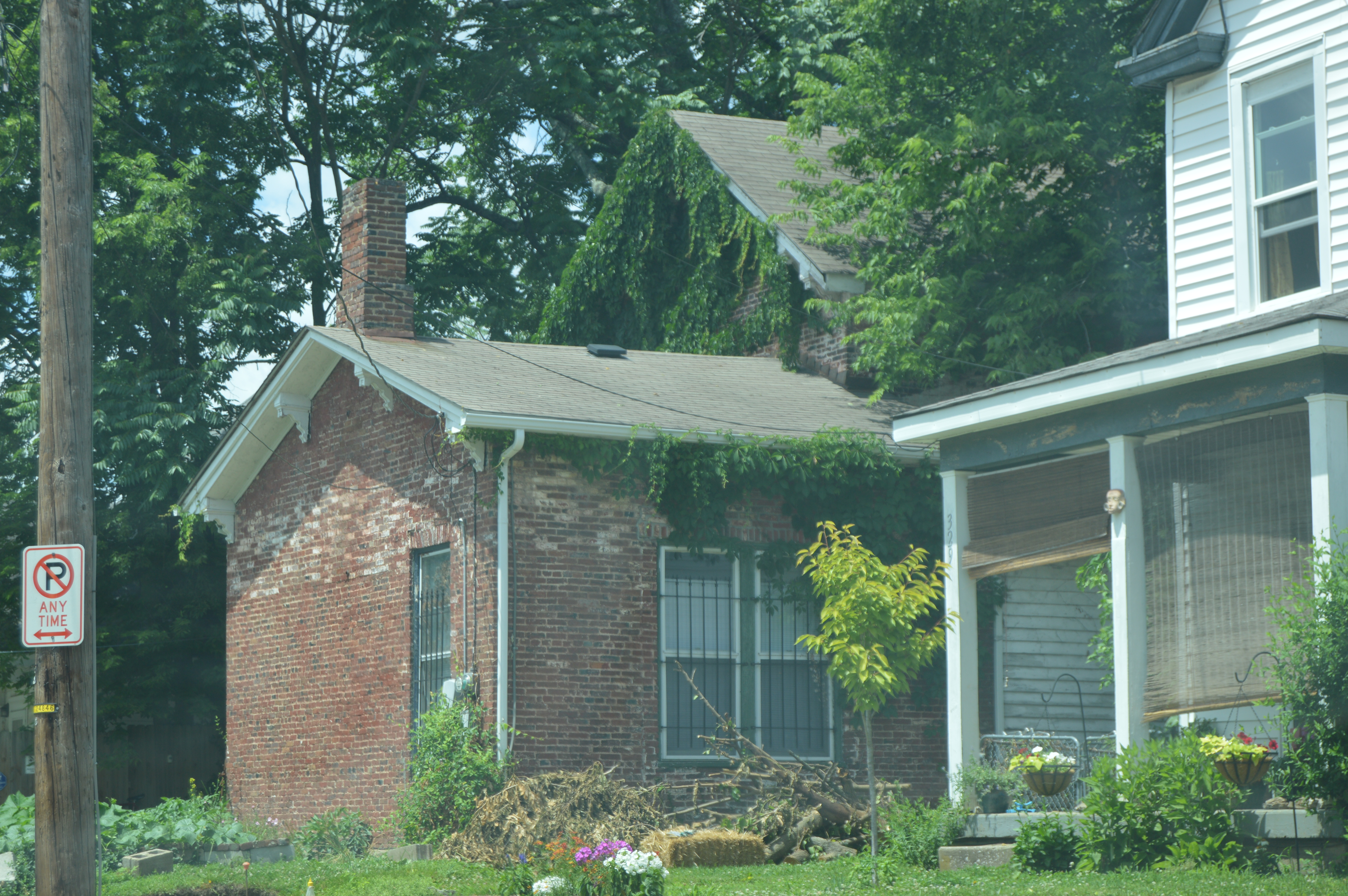
McCracken-Wilgus House

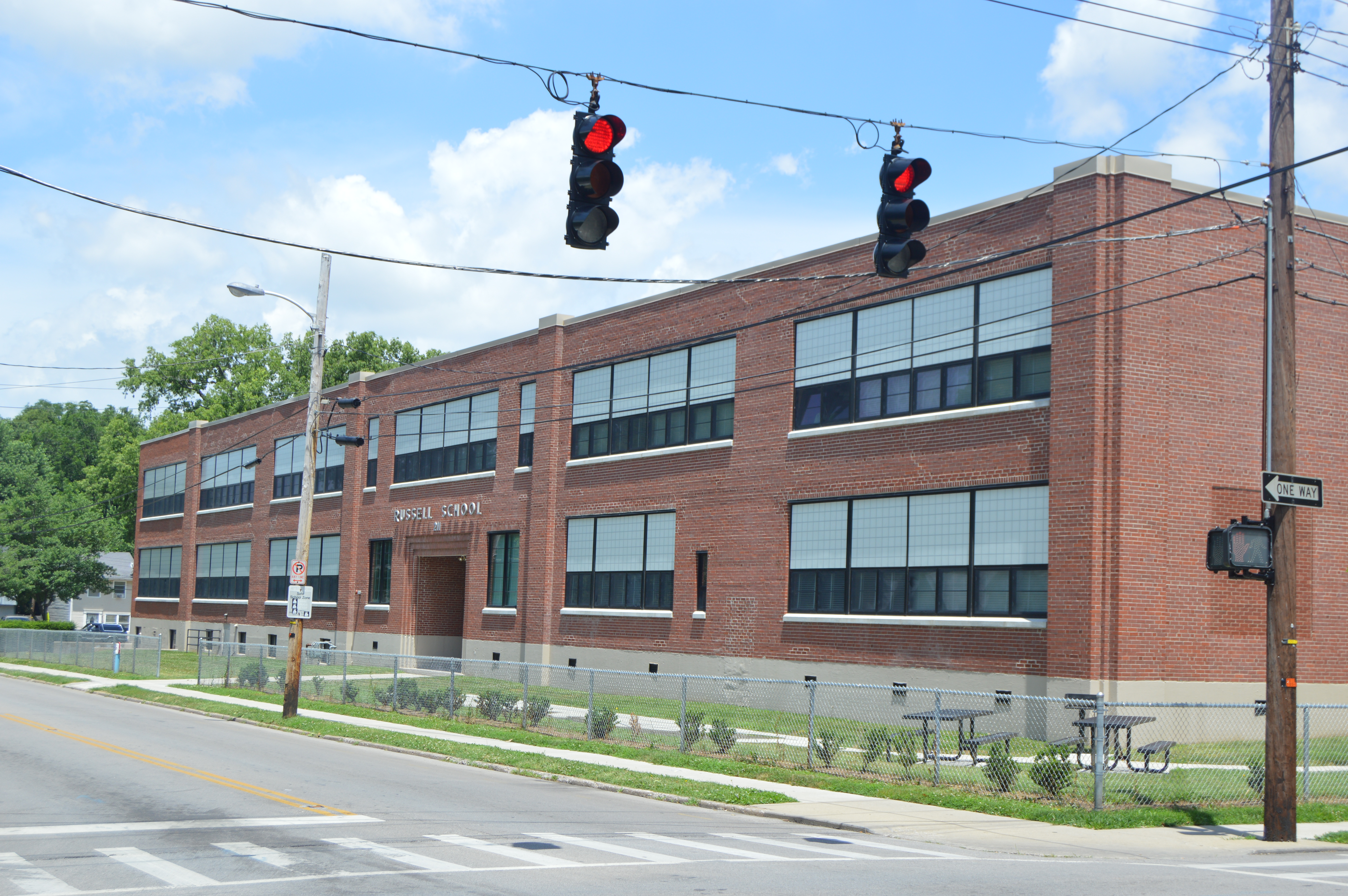
Russell School
