= Northside Middle School =

Northside Middle School may refer to:

- Northside Middle School (Columbus, Indiana)
- Northside Middle School, a Houston County School, Texas
- Northside Middle School (Norfolk, Virginia)
- Northside Middle School (Roanoke, Virginia)

== See also ==
- Northside High School (disambiguation)
- Northside Independent School District, San Antonio, Texas
