= Harrison West =

- Neighborhood of Columbus
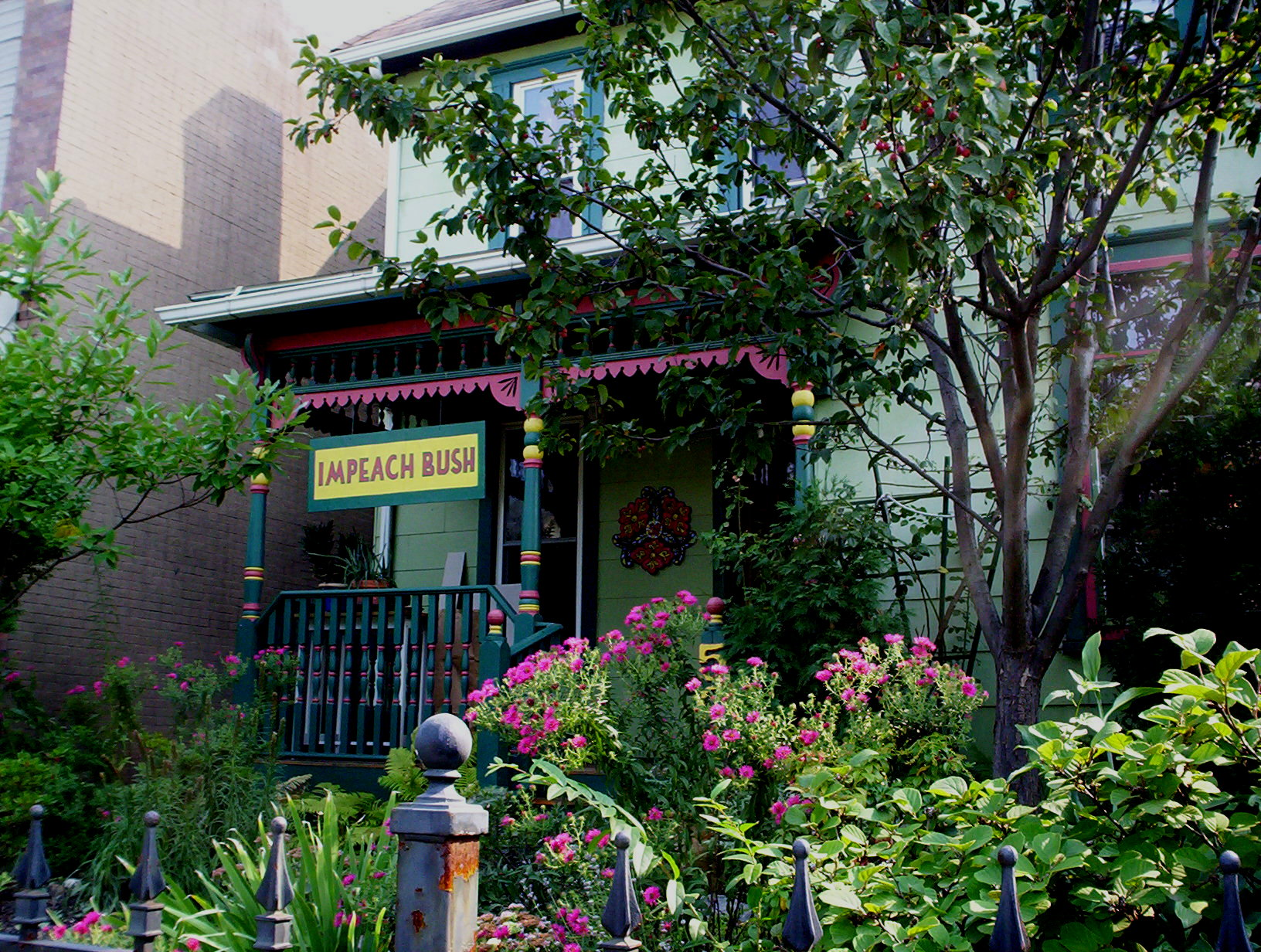
- Historic home in Harrison West, Ohio
- Interactive map of Harrison West
- Coordinates: 39°59′02″N 83°01′01″W
- Country: United States
- State: Ohio
- County: Franklin
- City: Columbus
- ZIP Code(s): 43201, 43212, 43215
- Area code: 614

Harrison West is a historic urban neighborhood located northwest of downtown Columbus, Ohio. It sits on several blocks along the Olentangy River and includes the western part of the Near Northside Historic District, which was placed on the National Register of Historic Places in 1975. The character of the neighborhood is similar to Victorian Village, which sits just to the east and is more well-known.

== History ==
Harrison West was established in the late 1800s and early 1900s on farmland that was first plowed by veterans of the Revolutionary War. It features "brick streets, housing built by craftsmen for workers in nearby factories, and fine examples of turn-of-the-century American town planning and architecture." The Harrison West neighborhood area experienced urban decline throughout much of the late 20th century. Just south of Harrison West, the similar "Flytown" was destroyed during "slum clearance" in the 1960s and replaced by Interstate 670 and the "James Thurber Village" apartment and business area. Redevelopment and gentrification, spreading from Victorian Village closer to downtown, have transformed the area in the last two decades, accelerating with the demolition of industrial sites along the Olentangy River.

== Geography ==
The area is bounded by Harrison Avenue on the east (which runs parallel to Neil Avenue), Goodale Street on the south, 5th Avenue on the north, and Olentangy River Road to the west (including "Gowdy Field"). In January 2008, the neighborhood expanded to include all of "Thurber Village" to the southeast.

== Demographics ==
Harrison West has a population of 1,347 whereas Columbus has a population of 837,038. That means 0.16% of Columbus's population resides in Harrison West. The median age in Columbus is 32.1 while in Harrison West it is 31.7. The population density in Harrison West is 6,716 per square mile, whereas in Columbus it is 3,829 per square mile. Harrison West skews more male, with a male-to-female ratio of 1.5:1, compared to the 1.0:1 ratio of Columbus as a whole. In Harrison West, 88.24% of the population is white, while in Columbus that percentage is only 61.12%. African Americans form the next largest racial group in Harrison West at 7.39% of the population, although they make up 27.96% of Columbus's population.

== Transportation ==
Harrison West is about two and a half miles from the city of Columbus. Even though the neighborhood is that close to the city itself, 81% of all traveling uses a car. Only 3% of all transportation uses some form of public transportation. The average one-way travel time to work is 10–19 minutes of driving. More than 80% of the population of West Harrison spends less than 29 minutes one-way driving to work.

== Structures and landmarks ==
Harrison West is listed on the National Register of Historic Places by inclusion in the Near Northside Historic District. Though home to several historic buildings, only the First Avenue School is recognized on the Columbus Register of Historic Properties. Other notable buildings in the neighborhood include the Fourth Avenue School building, built in 1904 and closed in 1976 which now operates as senior housing apartments. St. Francis of Assisi Church, established by Bishop Watterson and completed in 1896.

Some of the highlights of the neighborhood include public art and several parks. The Olentangy River runs through the neighborhood providing access to the Olentangy Recreation Trail, which stretches from downtown to north of I-270 in Worthington.

== Parks ==
1. Perry Street Park- Developed from the corner of West Third Avenue and Perry Street to the Olentangy Recreation Trail.
2. Harrison Park- Located on Harrison Park Place between First and Second Avenues, this community park provides facilities for child and family-friendly activities, including a handicap-accessible gazebo, playground, and access to the Greenway Trail. Four public art pieces designed by Columbus College of Art and Design students.
3. Harrison West Park- Harrison West is a small corner park that includes a playground, benches, picnic tables, walkways, fencing, and plants.
4. Side by Side Park- This small park is at the southeast corner of the Third Avenue Bridge over the Olentangy River and has become a key part of the Riverfront Vision Plan, featuring sculptures named "Side by Side", created by Charlotte Lees from Solon, Ohio.
5. Wheeler Memorial Park- Wheeler Park is in the southern half of Harrison West, one block west of Neil Avenue on Thurber Drive West. It features a 4-acre fenced off-leash dog park.

== Land use and zoning ==
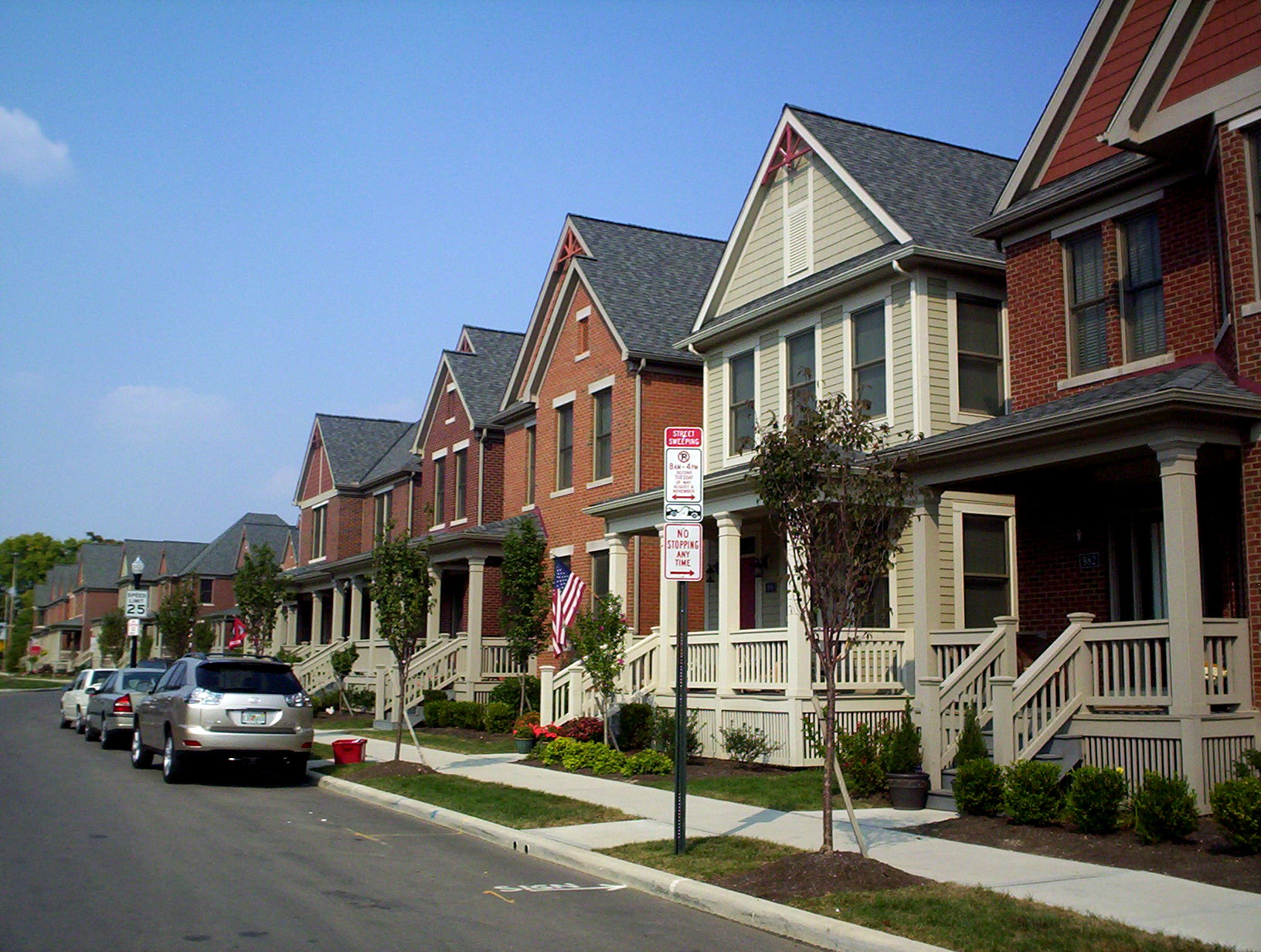
New homes in Harrison West

The majority of Harrison West is residential, but more recently, efforts have been made to expand on and add variety to the neighborhood's land us and zoning. In September 2005, the council adopted the Harrison West Plan. It originally served as a revision of the Harrison West Reach Section of the Columbus Riverfront Vision Plan, but ended up becoming the neighborhood's own, first-ever official community plan. The Harrison West Plan recommended that the neighborhood continue the development patterns that gave Harrison West its unique character, and in addition, more residential development, retail development, office and light industrial development, and parkland were all proposed. The Harrison West Plan was implemented to ensure that the neighborhood could retain its charm and character, but could also continue to be regarded as one of Columbus's most vibrant and desirable neighborhoods.

=== Harrison West Society ===
In response to the decline of the neighborhood in the 1970s, unscrupulous landlords, and mass demolition of housing, the residents of Harrison West organized the Harrison West Society “to preserve and improve the neighborhood” and to “broaden the appreciation of ethnic and social heritage with friendly contact.” When a shopping mall was proposed to be developed in the neighborhood, the Society worked to turn the proposal back. This started a new era in Harrison West that promoted public and private investment and a sense of community, which gave the neighborhood a chance to recover and thrive.

The Harrison West Society continues today as a nonprofit civic association, and in the last decade, it has made many improvements to the neighborhood. Some examples of work they have done are planting street trees, securing architectural improvements to the Third Avenue bridge, establishing four community parks (Wheeler Park, Harrison Park, Side-by-Side Park, and Harrison West Park), pushing for traffic calming measures to protect pedestrians, hosting potlucks and other social events, arranging improved alley and street lighting, organizing a public art project, sponsoring zoning changes, helping to shape a comprehensive plan, and working to reduce crime.

== Entertainment ==
The Third Avenue business district boasts a neighborhood bar, a brewery and coffee shop, a breakfast and lunch café, and multiple hair and nail salons.

While not directly in Harrison West, there are many entertainment spots within walking distance of the neighborhood. The Arena District is located 1.6 miles away and has many types of recreation. There are 14 restaurants and bars, an 11-screen movie theater, a skating rink, and a music pavilion. Goodale Park is considered to be Columbus' oldest park and it is located only 0.8 miles away. The park was donated by Dr. Lincoln Goodale; on July 14, 1851, Dr. Goodale donated 40 acres for strictly public use. Today it is surrounded by Victorian Village and is home to many events including ComFest, a large, free, art and music festival. Huntington Park is home to the Columbus Clippers minor league baseball team and is only 1.4 miles away. There is also Nationwide Arena, home to the Columbus Blue Jackets hockey team, which is a mere 1.4 miles away. Finally Harrison West is only 0.9 miles away from the Short North Arts District. This strip going from The Ohio State University to downtown Columbus is one of the most popular destinations for local art and entertainment in the country.

== Education ==
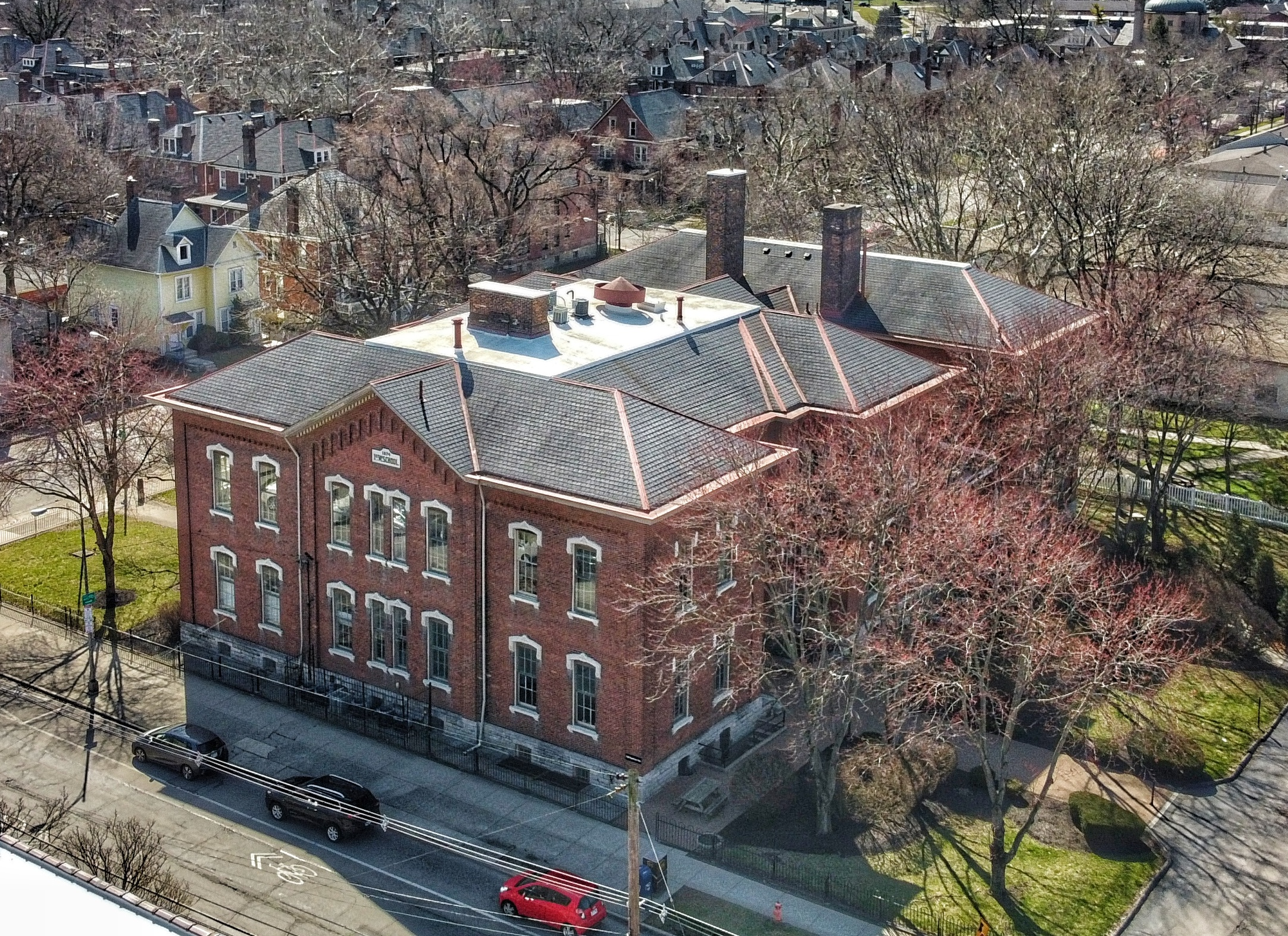
First Avenue School

Harrison West's graduation rates are much higher than both the averages of Columbus and of Ohio. 88.2% graduate high school, whereas the average in Ohio is 84.2%. In Harrison West, 57.5% complete a bachelor's degree, compared to Ohio where only 24.7% complete it. The difference is again double, as 18.2% of people complete a master's degree in Harrison West, but only 9.1% in Ohio as a whole.
