= North Side station =

North Side station may refer to:

- North Side station (Trinity Metro), a station in Fort Worth, Texas, USA
- North Side station (PAAC), a station in Pittsburgh, Pennsylvania, USA

== See also ==
- Northside station, a station on the Metrorail rapid transit service in Miami-Dade County, Florida
