= South Yarmouth/Bass River Historic District =

Historic district in Massachusetts, United States

- U.S. National Register of Historic Places
- U.S. Historic district
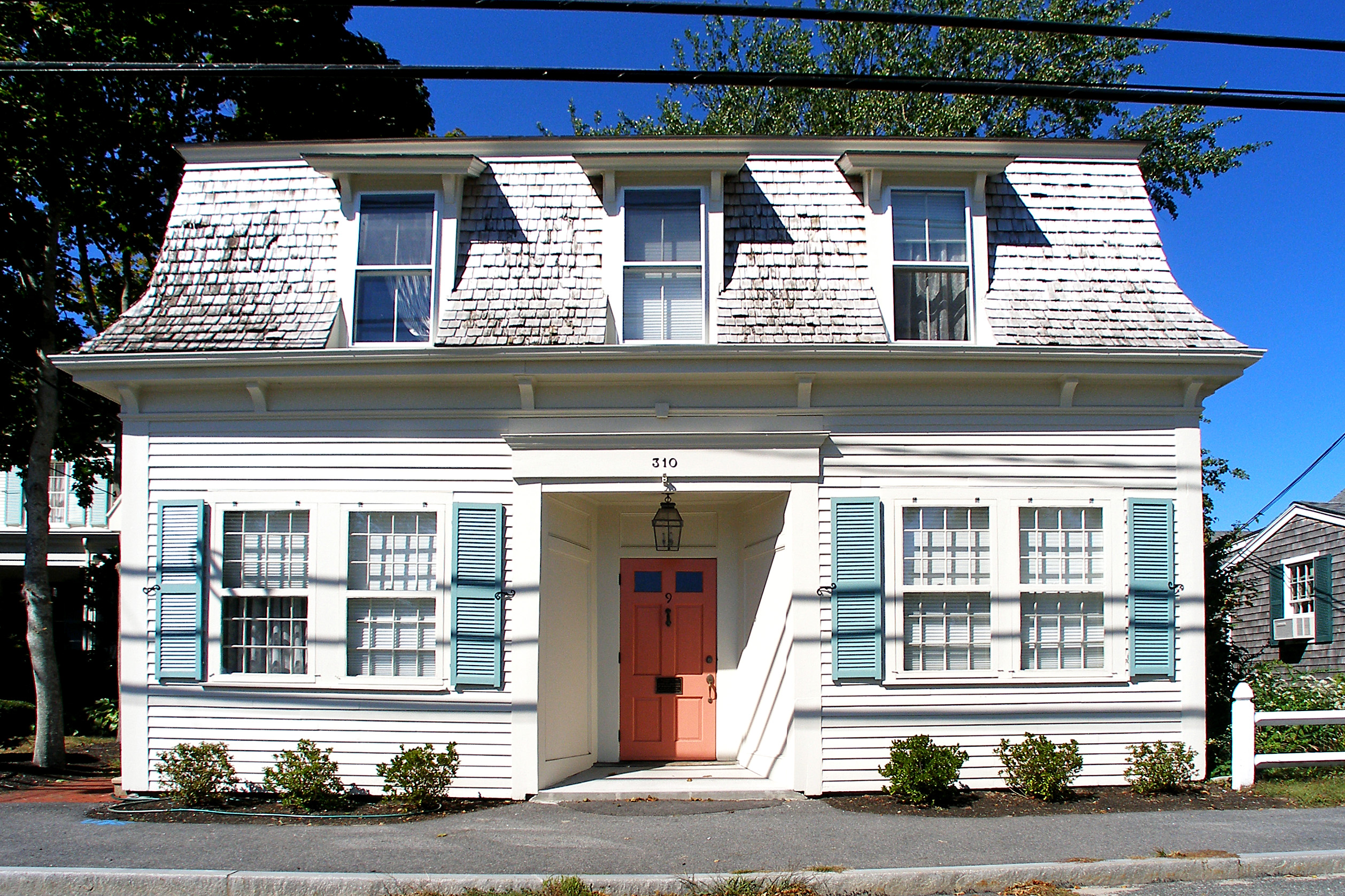

- Location within Cape Cod Location within Massachusetts Location within the United States
- Location: Yarmouth, Massachusetts
- Coordinates: 41°39′39″N 70°11′35″W
- Architectural style: Mid 19th Century Revival, Early Republic, Late Victorian
- NRHP reference No.: 90000787
- Added to NRHP: May 29, 1990

The South Yarmouth/Bass River Historic District is a historic district in the southeastern part of Yarmouth, Massachusetts. It encompasses a predominantly residential area centered on a portion of Old Main Street and South Street between the villages of South Yarmouth and Bass River. The area's history is one of maritime-related industry from the late 18th to late 19th century, and then its growth as a tourist resort community. The district was listed on the National Register of Historic Places in 1990.

Although Yarmouth was settled in the 17th century, its southern portions did not begin developing until around the time of American independence in the late 18th century, since much of the land had been set aside as an Indian reservation. A major smallpox epidemic crippled the Indian population, and the reservation lands were sold off. The area along the Bass River developed a maritime economy. By the turn of the 19th century, it was one of the economic centers of Barnstable County. Although remnants of older buildings survive as parts of others, the oldest buildings in the district date to the 1790s, and the oldest major civic structure in the district is the Friends Meeting House (1809), and its adjacent burial ground.

With the growth of the maritime industries, a variety of housing was built between 1800 and the 1850s, in architectural styles (Cape, Federal, and Greek Revival) popular during that time. These forms are those most commonly seen in the district. Other churches joined the Quaker meeting house: the Baptist Church in 1826 and the Methodist Church in 1852. Maritime industry began a decline in the second half of the 19th century, but the arrival of the railroads heralded the beginning of the area's conversion to a summer resort destination, and the area around Main Street and the bridge across the Bass River took shape as the main village center of South Yarmouth with the construction of a number of retail and commercial buildings. A number of buildings in later 19th century styles, including Gothic, Queen Anne, and Craftsman styles, are included in the district.

In the 20th century, the development of Route 28 bypassed the section of Main Street (now Old Main Street), while other sections of Main Street which were included in expansions of Route 28 became more heavily developed with modern buildings.

== See also ==
- National Register of Historic Places listings in Barnstable County, Massachusetts
