= Pizzuti Collection =

Art museum in Columbus, Ohio, U.S.

Columbus Museum of Art at The Pizzuti (The Pizzuti)

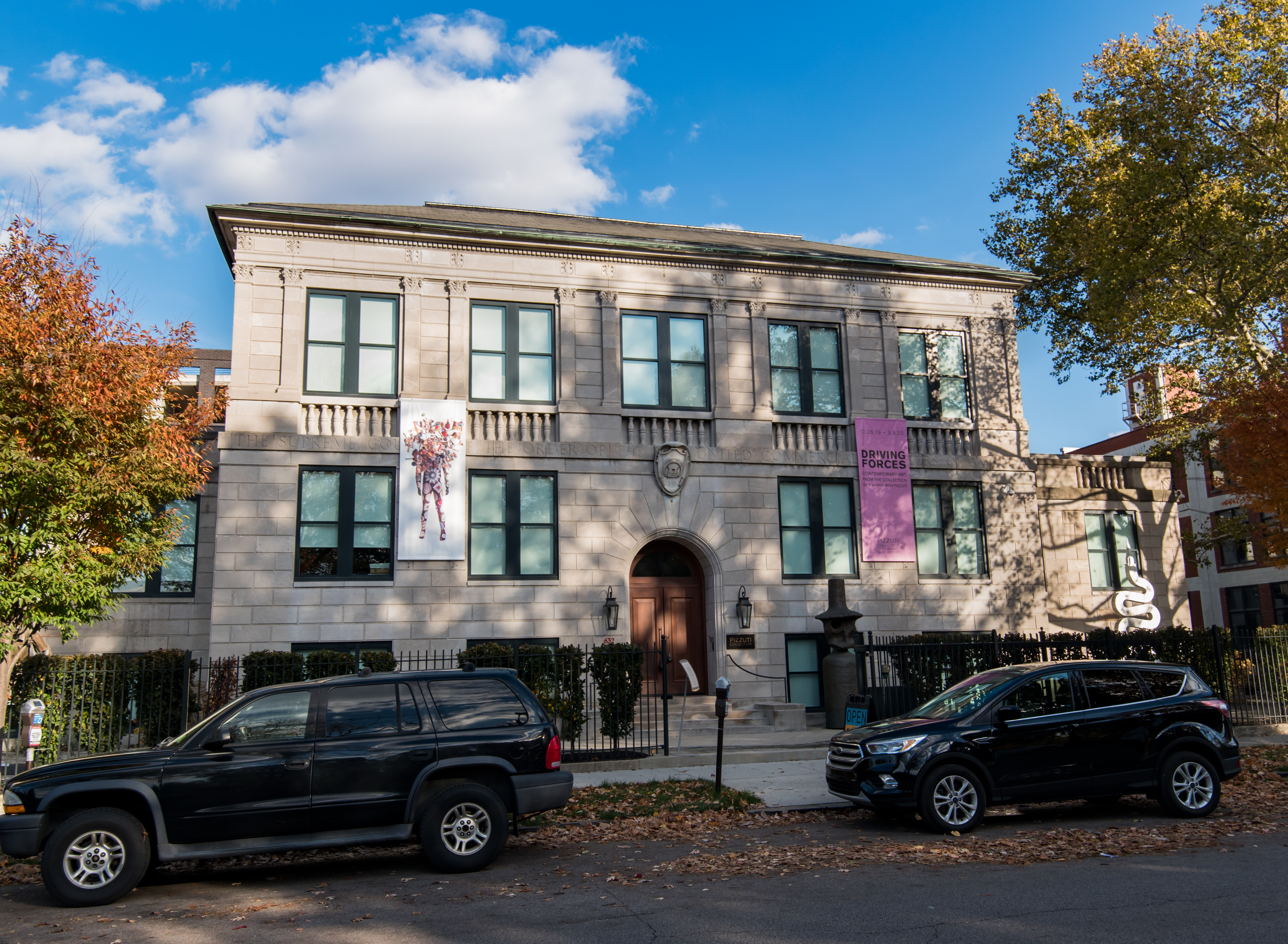
- Established: 2013
- Location: 632 N. Park Street, Columbus, Ohio
- Coordinates: 39°58′30″N 83°00′16″W
- Type: Contemporary art
- Executive director: Brooke A. Minto
- Public transit access: 1, 2, 5, Night Owl
- Website: www.columbusmuseum.org/pizzuti-collection

Columbus Museum of Art at The Pizzuti is a museum for contemporary art in Columbus, Ohio, United States. It has been part of the Columbus Museum of Art since September 2018. The three-story gallery is located in the Short North and Victorian Village neighborhoods, on the eastern edge of Goodale Park. Its exhibits rotate, featuring artists from around the world.

The museum was originally owned by the Pizzuti family, which made its wealth from the real estate firm the Pizzuti Companies. The family began collecting art in 1977, after a trip to Paris. The Pizzuti Collection opened in 2013, and had shown 16 temporary exhibits before its 2018 donation to the Columbus Museum of Art.

== Attributes ==
The museum primarily exhibits the Pizzuti family's collection, estimated in 2018 at about 2,400 works of contemporary art. The three-story Pizzuti Collection building in the Short North was built in the 1920s and has 18,000 square feet (1,700 m^{2}). The museum displays temporary rotating exhibits of international artists. By the time of its donation in 2018, the museum had hosted 16 exhibitions with artists from 40 countries. No more than 10 percent of the collection has been displayed at any time.

The museum building contributes to the Near Northside Historic District, on the National Register of Historic Places.

== History ==
The museum building was formerly the headquarters to the Order of United Commercial Travelers of America, from 1924 to 2008.

The museum was originally owned and operated by the Pizzuti family. Ron and Ann Pizzuti owed much of their wealth to their Pizzuti Companies, a real estate development company. The pair have been art collectors since about 1977. Ron Pizzuti began his interest in art during a visit to Paris, admiring a work by Frank Stella. His first purchase, for $900, was Circus People by Karel Appel, from the Pace Gallery's former Columbus location.

Around 2013, the Pizzutis renovated the Pizzuti Collection's building into the public gallery. The museum opened to the public in 2013.

In September 2018, the museum and part of its collection was donated to the Columbus Museum of Art. The Pizzuti, along with the main branch of the museum, temporarily closed beginning in March 2020 due to the 2020 coronavirus pandemic.
