= Northside High School =

Northside High School or North Side High School or Northside Christian School or Northside School ir similar can refer to:

== United States ==
=== Alabama ===
- Northside High School (Northport, Alabama), a high school in Alabama

=== Arkansas ===
- Northside High School (Fort Smith, Arkansas)

=== Florida ===
- Havana Northside High School, Havana, Florida
- Northside Christian School (St. Petersburg, Florida), a high school in Florida

=== Georgia ===
- Northside High School, which merged into North Atlanta High School, Atlanta, Georgia
- Northside High School (Columbus, Georgia)
- Northside High School (Warner Robins, Georgia)

=== Illinois ===
- Northside College Preparatory High School, Chicago, Illinois

=== Indiana ===
- North Side High School (Fort Wayne, Indiana)

=== Louisiana ===
- Northside High School (Lafayette, Louisiana)

=== Mississippi ===
- Northside High School (Mississippi), in Shelby
- Northside School (Mississippi), a landmark in Clay County, Mississippi

=== Montana ===
- Northside School (Montana), on the National Register of Historic Places in Park County, Montana

=== North Carolina ===
- Northside Christian Academy, Charlotte, North Carolina
- Northside High School (Jacksonville, North Carolina)
- Northside High School (Pinetown, North Carolina), part of Beaufort County Schools (North Carolina)

=== Ohio ===
- Northside Christian School, Westerville, Ohio

=== South Carolina ===
- Northside Christian School (North Charleston, SC), North Charleston, South Carolina

=== Tennessee ===
- North Side High School (Jackson, Tennessee)
- Northside High School (Memphis, Tennessee)

=== Texas ===
- John Marshall High School (Leon Valley, Texas) (formerly Northside High School), Leon Valley, Texas
- North Side High School (Fort Worth, Texas)
- Northside School (Fargo, Texas)
- Northside High School (Houston), Texas

=== Virginia ===
- Northside High School (Roanoke, Virginia)

=== Washington ===
- North Side High School, former name of Whatcom Middle School, Washington

== See also ==
- Northside Middle School (disambiguation)
