= Near Northside Historic District (Columbus, Ohio) =

Historic district in Columbus, Ohio, U.S.

- U.S. National Register of Historic Places
- U.S. Historic district
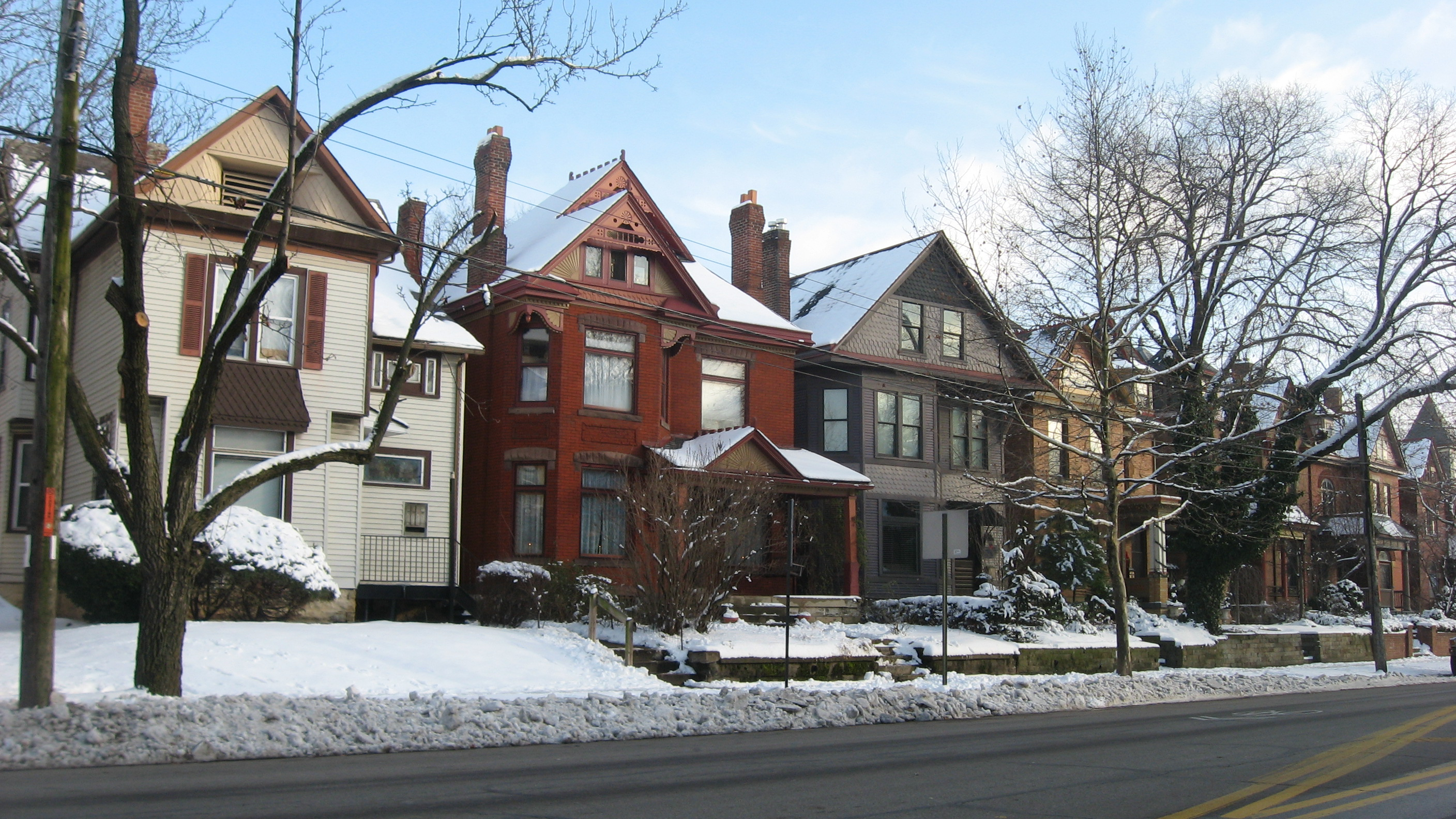
- Contributing houses
- Interactive map
- Location: Off State Route 315, Columbus, Ohio
- Coordinates: 39.984722°N 83.0125°W
- NRHP reference No.: 80003001
- Added to NRHP: June 4, 1980

The Near Northside Historic District is a historic district in Columbus, Ohio. The large district encompasses portions of the University District, Harrison West, and nearly all of Victorian Village.

== Description ==
The district was listed on the National Register of Historic Places in 1980. The district is made up of about 70 square blocks, with houses developed generally between 1870 and 1920. Architectural styles range from Italianate to Second Empire, Eastlake, Romanesque Revival, and Shingle Style, with some vernacular buildings as well. District boundaries overlap with the city's Victorian Village Historic District.

The First Avenue School, on the Columbus Register of Historic Properties, also lies within this district.

== Gallery ==
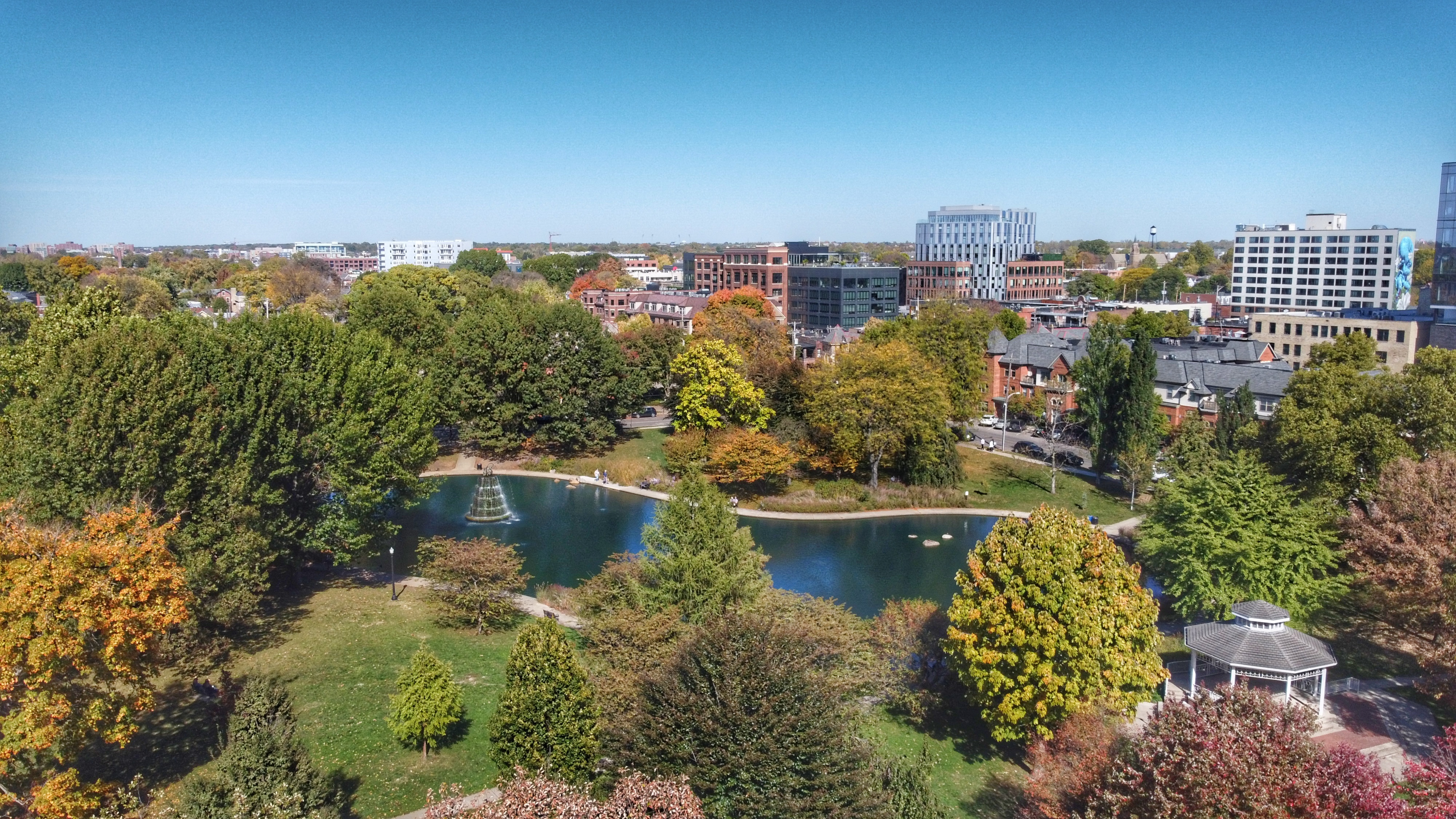
Goodale Park

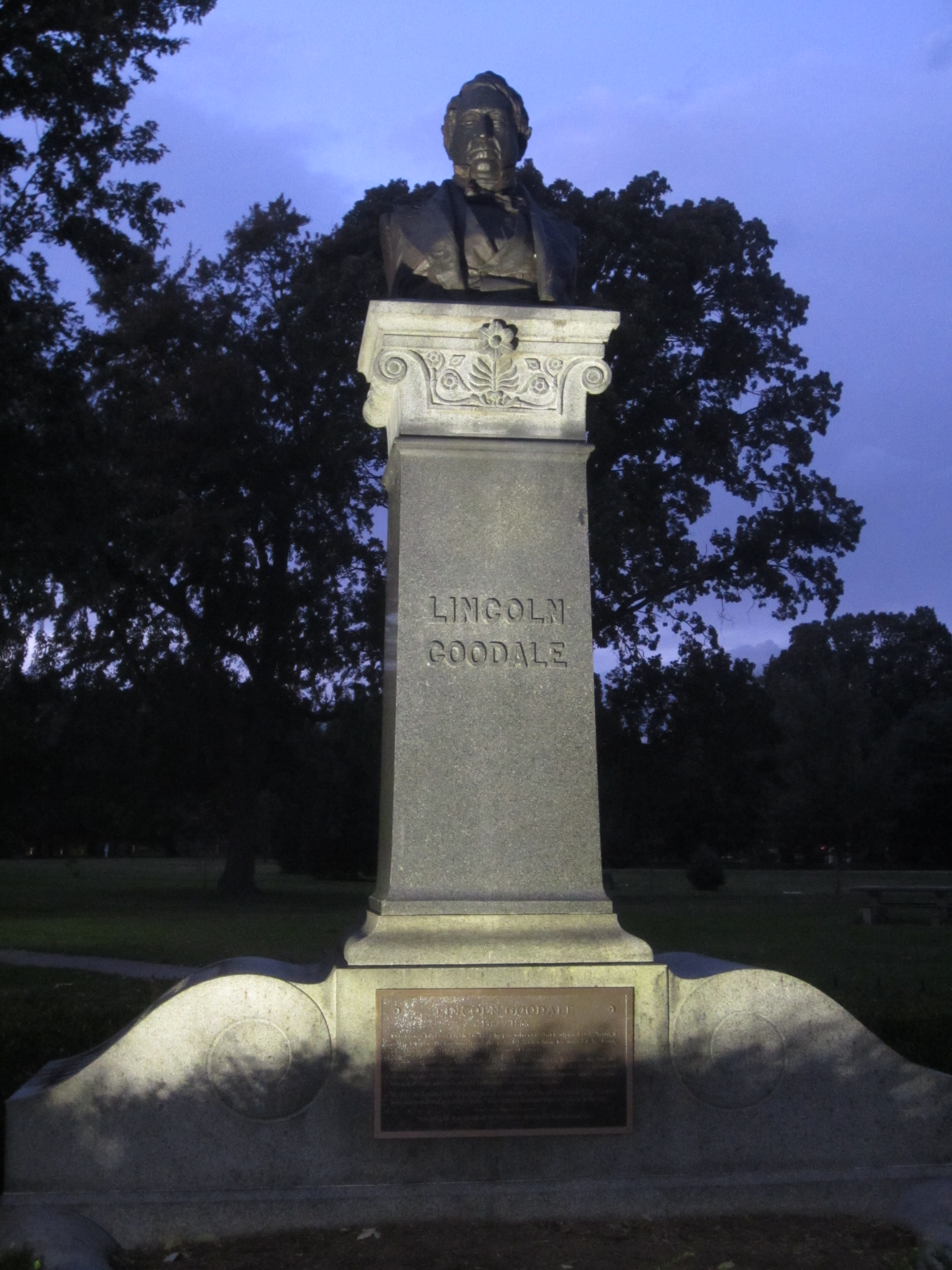
Lincoln Goodale Monument

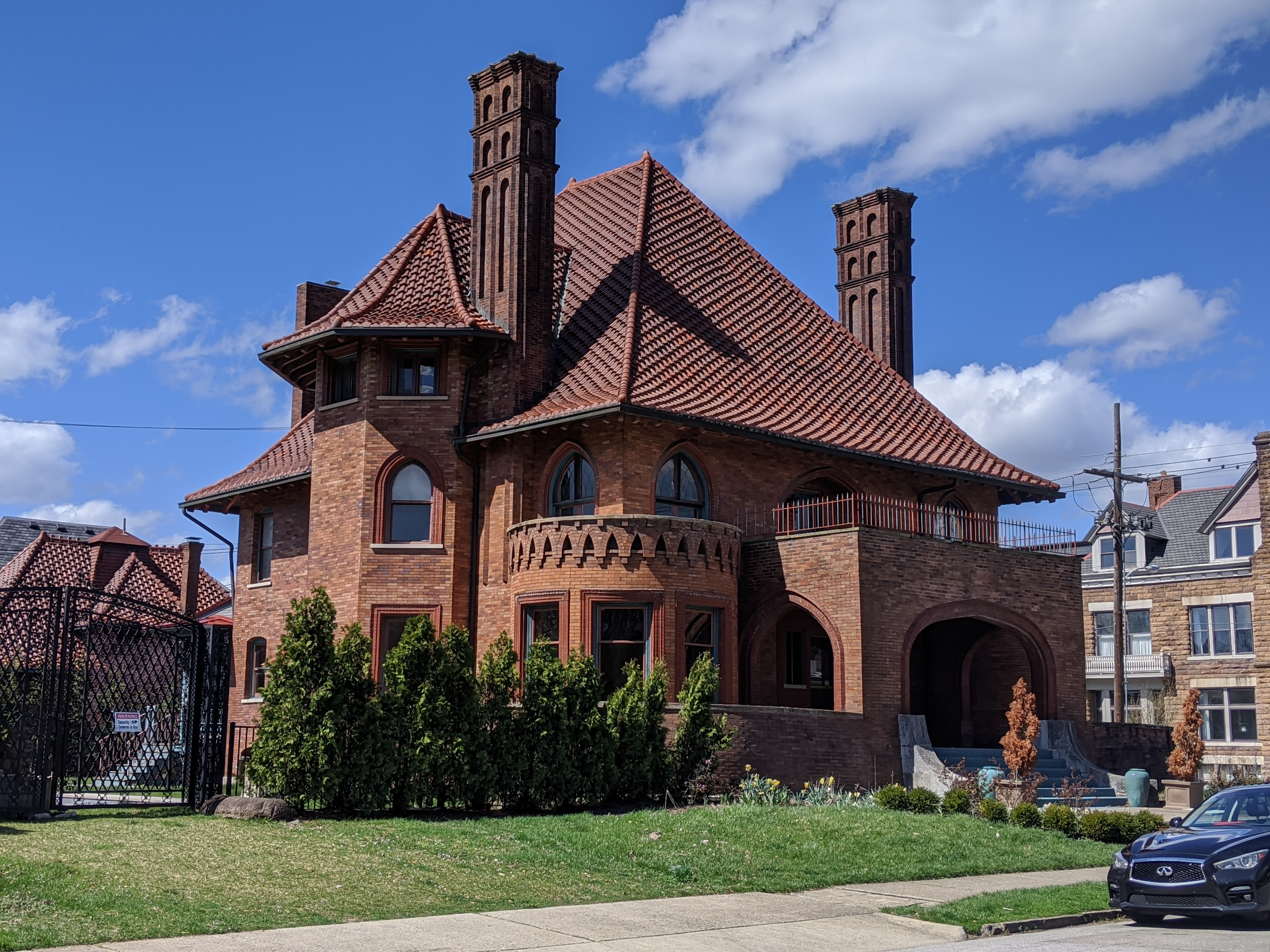
Circus House

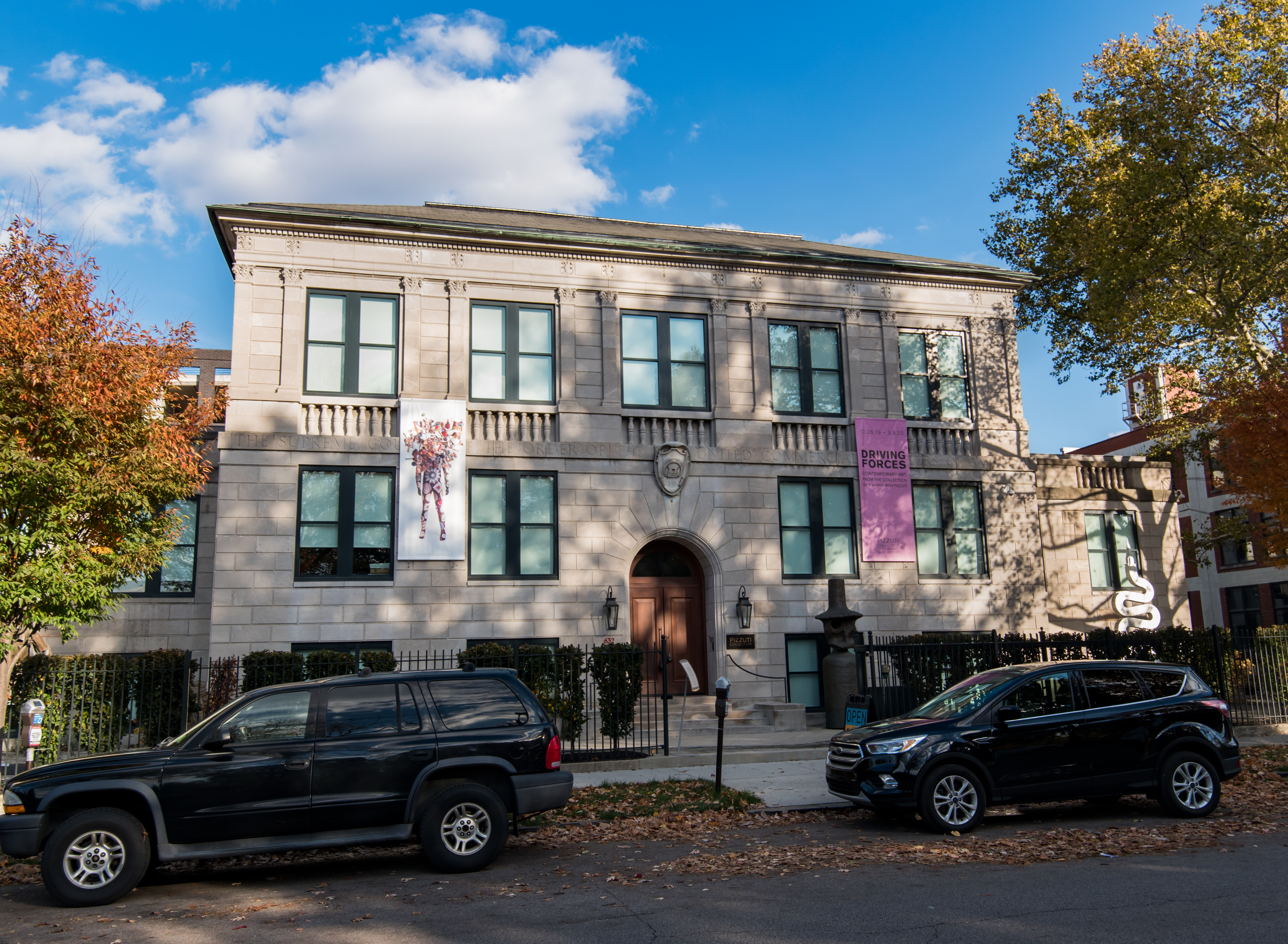
Pizzuti Collection

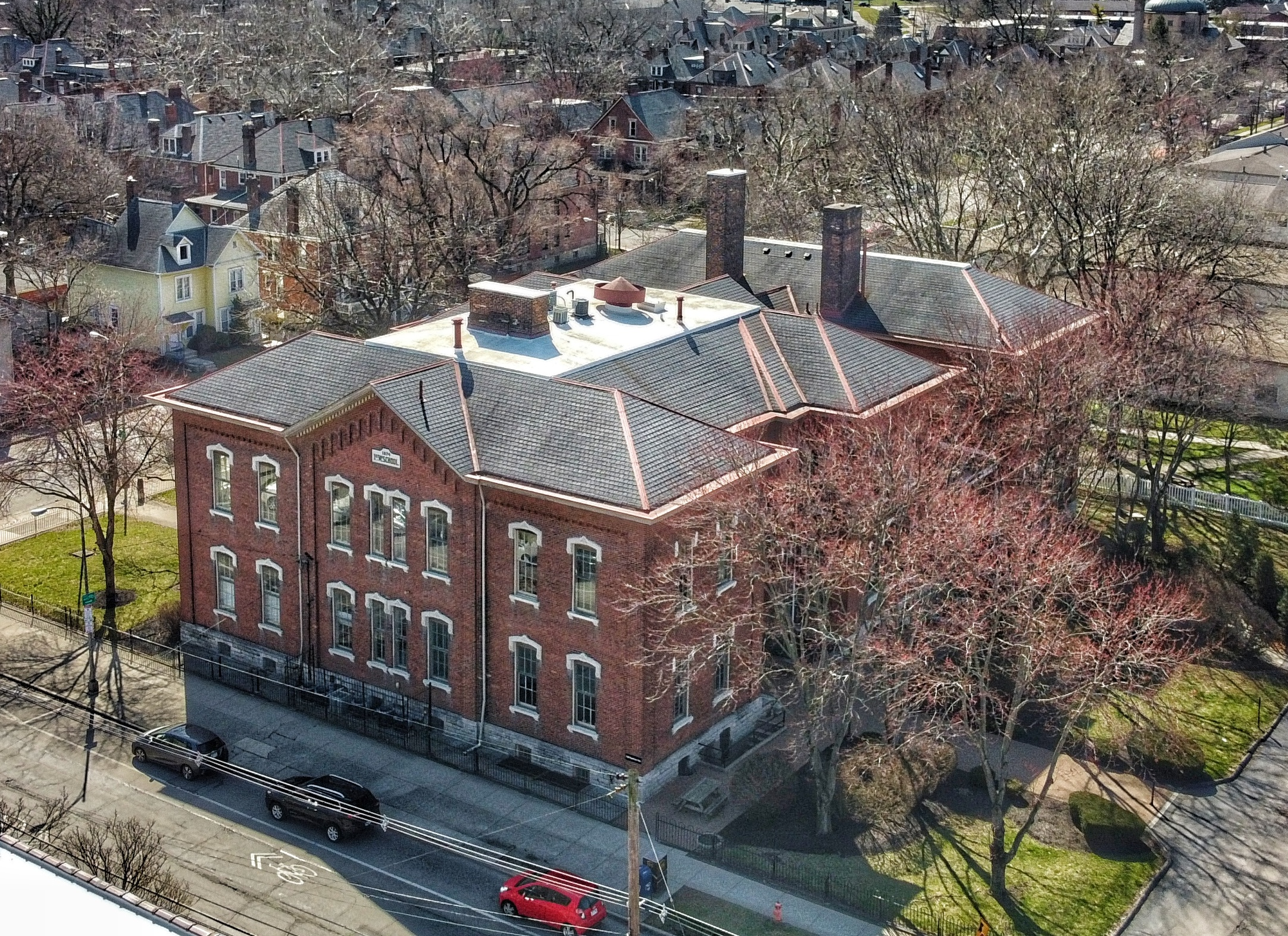
First Avenue School

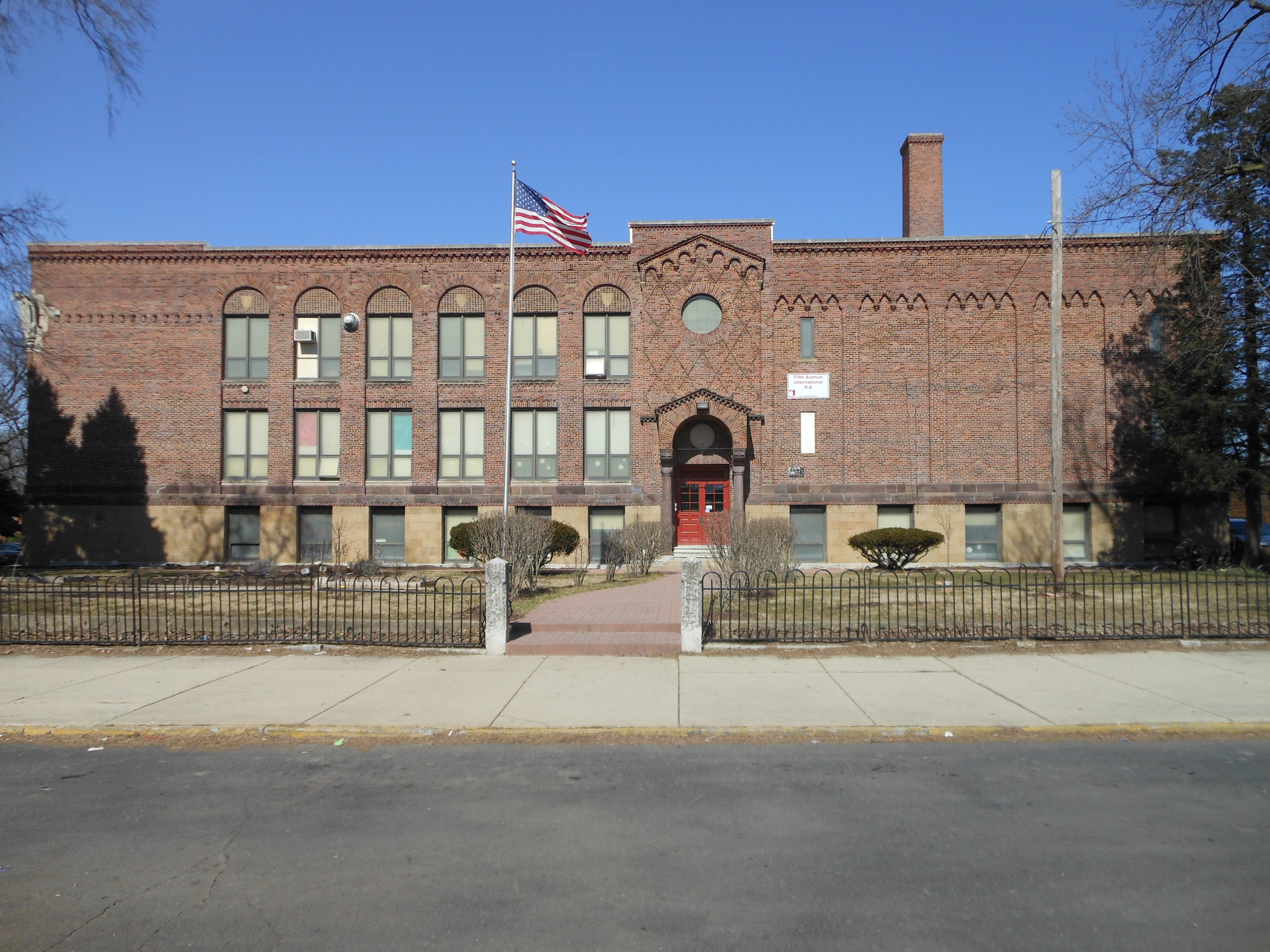
Everett Middle School / Old North High School

== See also ==
- National Register of Historic Places listings in Columbus, Ohio
