= Park Hotel (Columbus, Ohio) =

Hotel in Columbus, Ohio

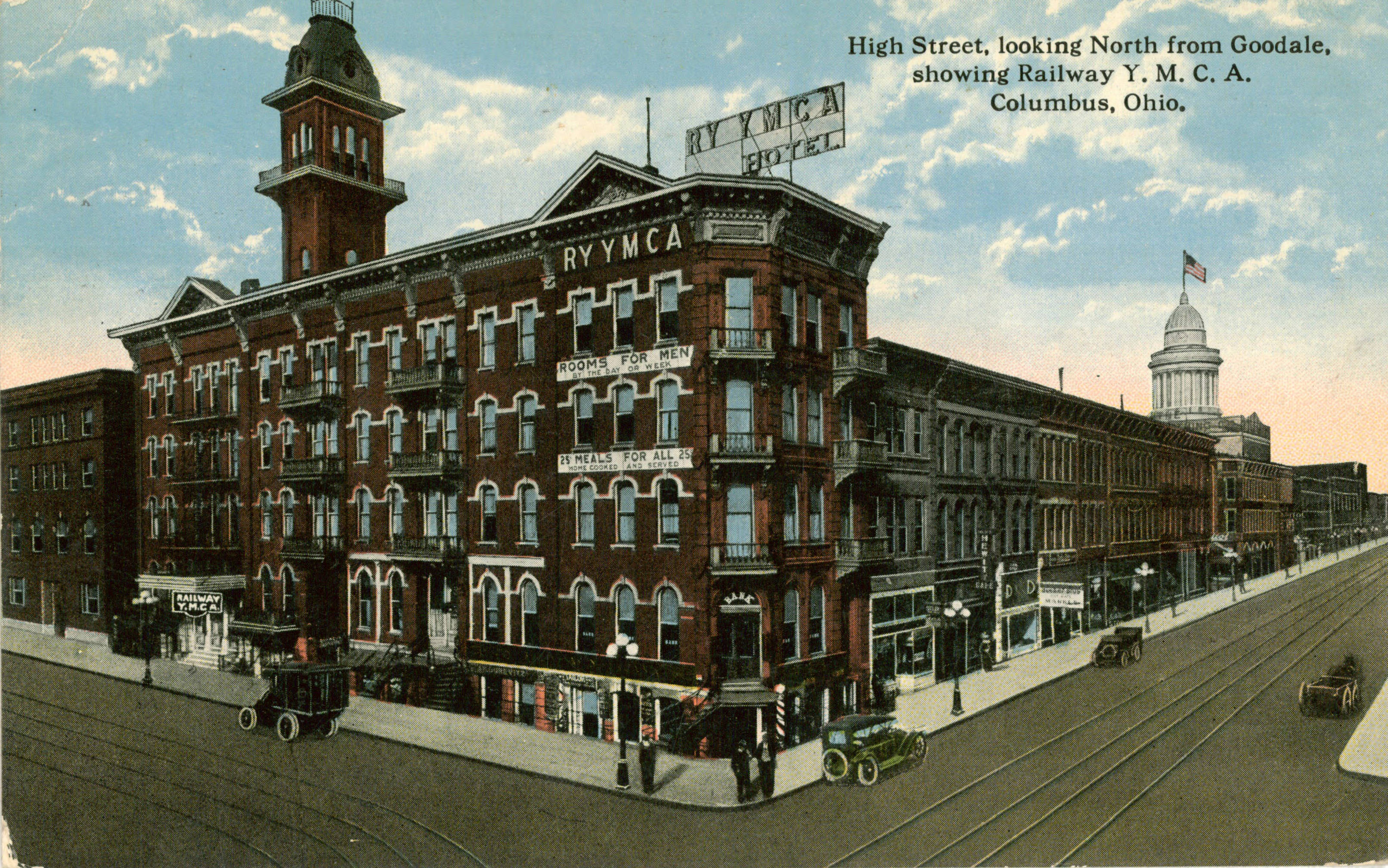
- Postcard showing a portion of the hotel
- Interactive map pinpointing the hotel's location

General information
- Status: Demolished
- Location: 16 W. Goodale Street, Columbus, Ohio
- Coordinates: 39.973864°N 83.003279°W
- Completed: 1853 (first building)
- Opened: March 4, 1879 (hotel opening)
- Demolished: 1958

Technical details
- Floor count: 4

Design and construction
- Architects: Johnson & Kramer

The Park Hotel was a hotel in Columbus, Ohio. It was later in its history known successively as the Northern Hotel, the Railway Y.M.C.A., and as the Goodale Hotel. The building stood at the northwest corner of North High Street and Goodale Street.

The hotel's oldest section was constructed in 1853 for Capital University, and served the school for about 20 years. Around 1876, a new section was built for the new Park Hotel. A hotel or Y.M.C.A. operated in the building until 1958, when it was demolished for the Goodale Expressway (Interstate 670). A set of restaurants now span the High Street viaduct over the expressway.

== Attributes ==
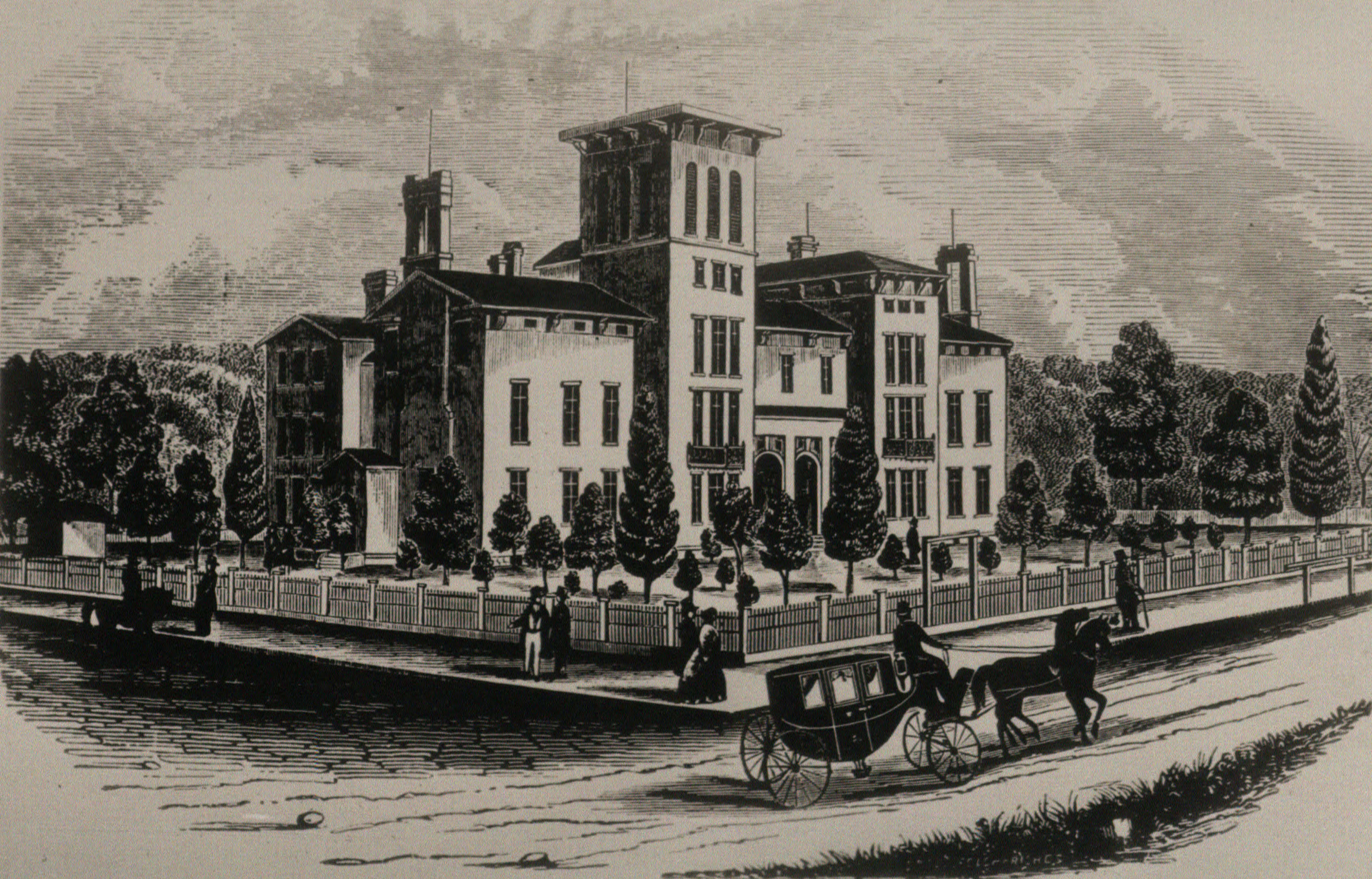
Original university building

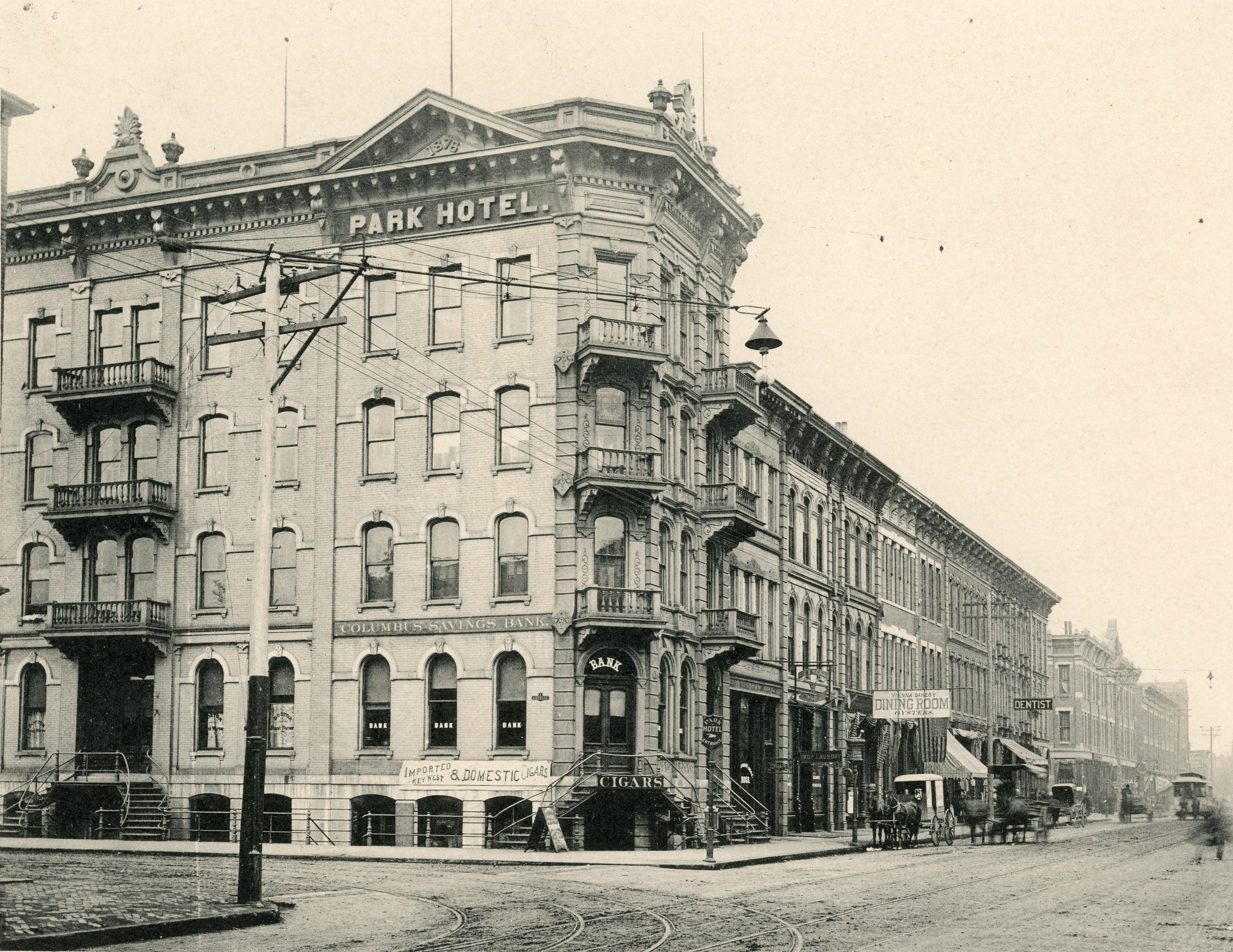
Circa 1889

The building stood at the northwest corner of North High Street and Goodale Street. It was two blocks north of Union Depot. It was designed in an Italianate style, popular at the time. The original portion of the building measured 154 ft (47 m) at its front and 55–69 ft (17–21 m) in depth, with varying heights; some sections were three to four stories, and a tower mearued 75 feet tall. It had a large entrance hall, two stories in height. Other rooms in the school building included classrooms, lecture rooms, a library, laboratory, and halls with libraries for three literary societies: the Clio, the Hermann, and the Germania.

The building saw numerous changes throughout its time. The hotel portion was constructed fronting Goodale and High Streets, built at an estimated cost of $40,000. The High Street facade was made of stone; the Goodale Street facade used brick though with heavy stone trimmings. The roof and cornices were made of galvanized iron. The hotel's main entrance was on Goodale Street; other entrances were facing High Street (the "ladies' entrance") and Park Street. The corner storefront was to be used as a bank. The building was designed by the firm Johnson & Kramer, of 62 N. High Street. The university building remained, visible on the west side, facing Goodale Park. The new building would measure 153 feet facing Goodale Street, 53 feet of frontage on High Street, and 210 feet facing Goodale Park. Eventually a porch was added onto the first floor to allow guests to watch street traffic.

The building was to have four and a half floors and 125 rooms (including 16 suites). It included a hydraulic passenger elevator made by Howard Iron Works in Buffalo, New York, the first elevator in a hotel in Columbus. Steam heating was provided throughout the building. The hotel interior contained a business office, reading room, and a 40x80-ft. dining room. A wash room, baggage room, and closets made up other portions of the floor. The basement had billiard and hairdressing parlors and a combined bar and restaurant. The second floor had a private entrance for women, as well as two ladies' parlors. Many of the hotel rooms facing west, east, or south had balconies. The top balcony, around the observatory, gave guests views from 135 ft. above street-level.

For some of its history, space between the building and Goodale Park, along Park Street, had a small private park for the benefit of the hotel. The park had an abundance of foliage around asphalt paths, fountains, and gas lamps.

The Park Hotel's amenities and design were considered modern and luxurious, and the venue was favored by Supreme Court justices, U.S. judges, court officials, and other officials.

== History ==
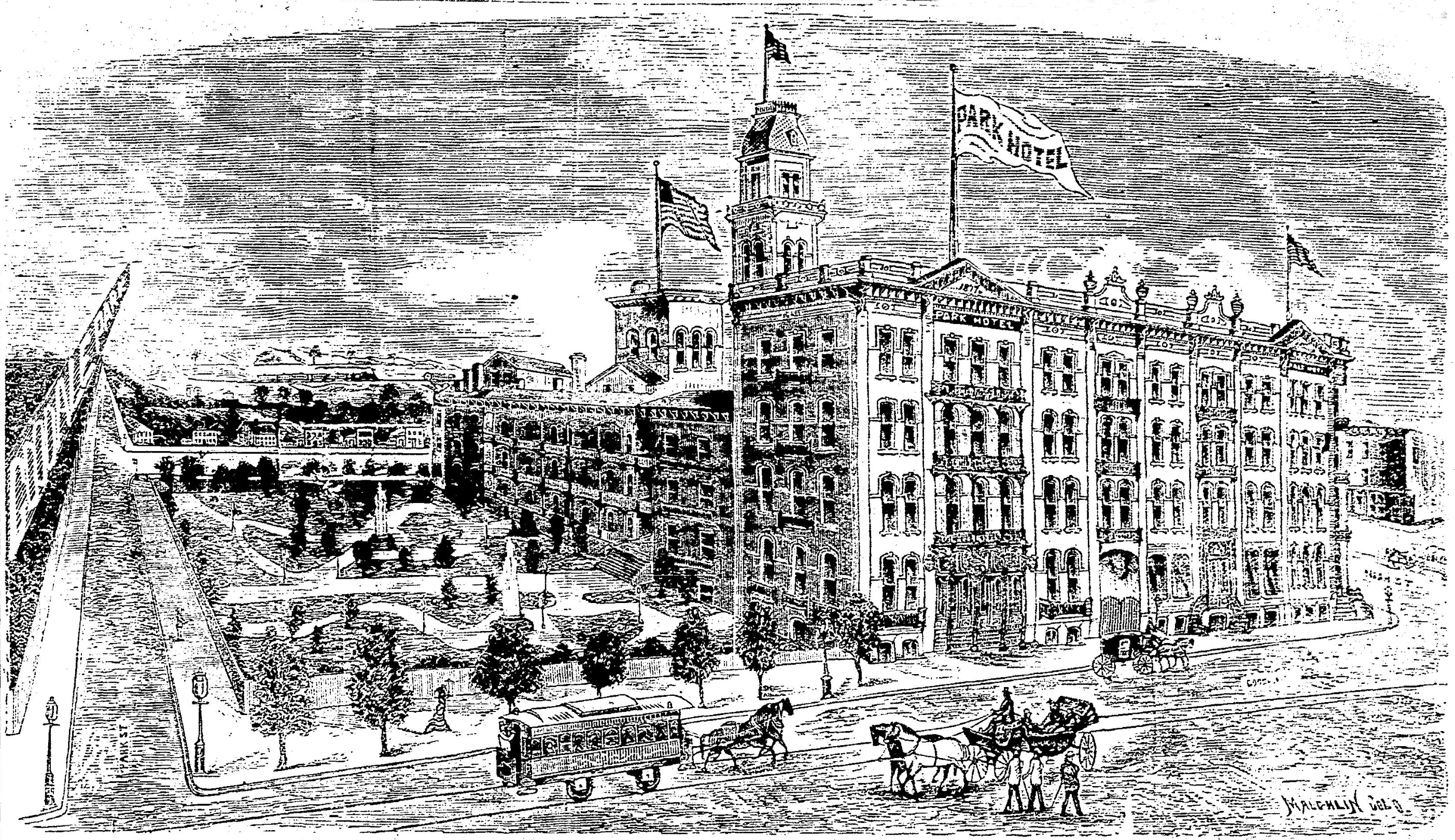
Illustration of the hotel showing the former university building at the left

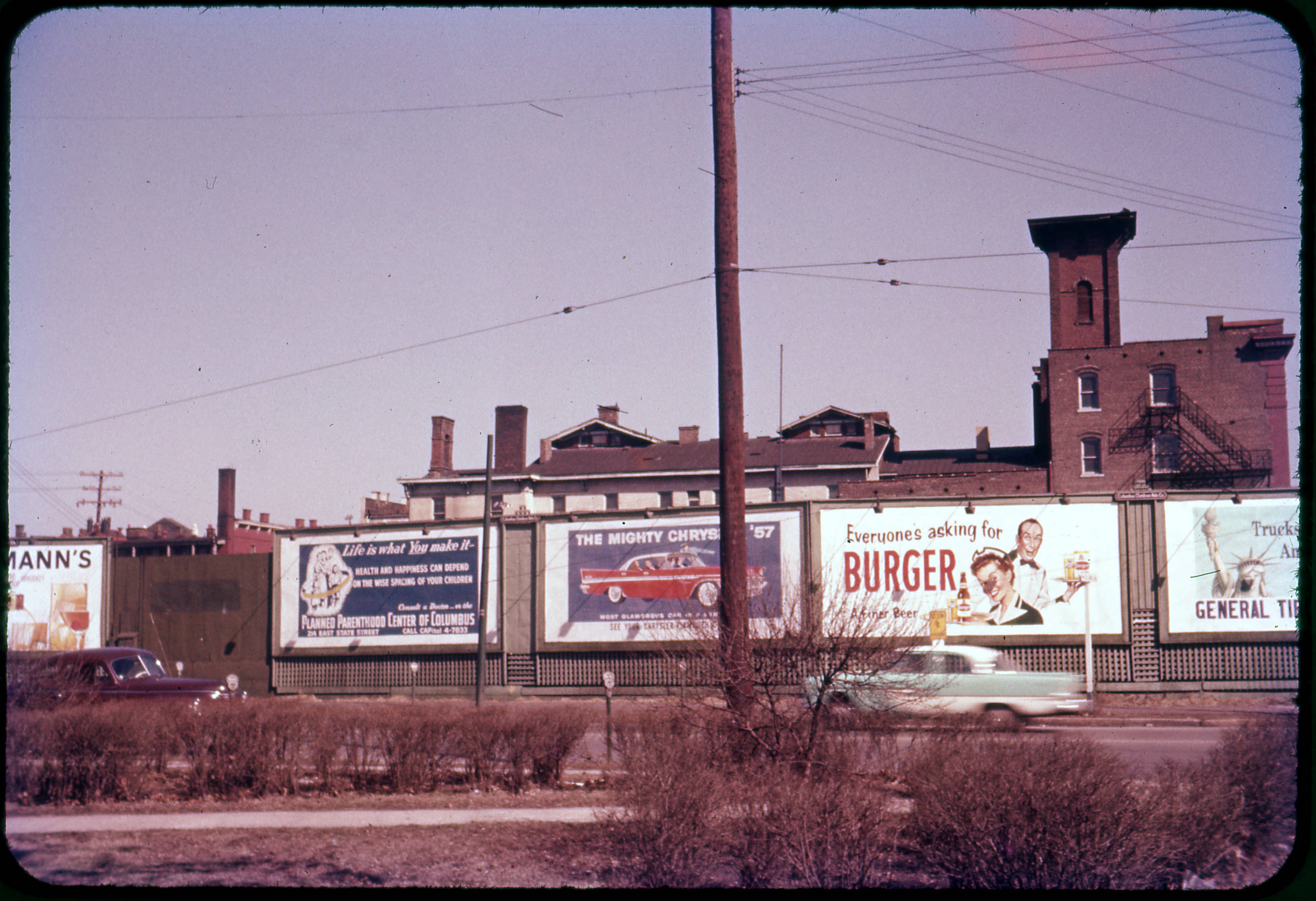
Remaining hotel structure by March 1957, facing east

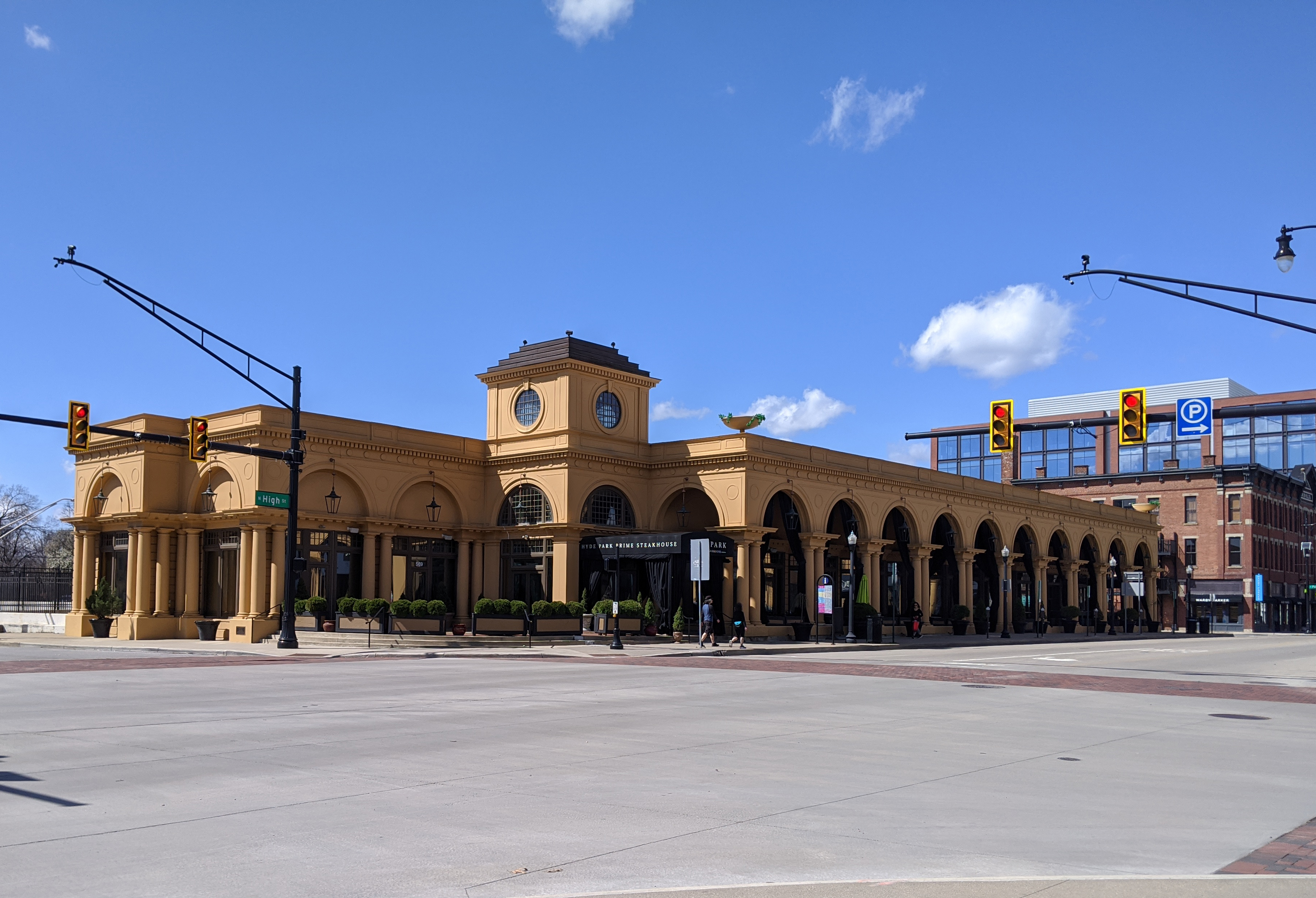
The Cap, a commercial building on the site today

The oldest portion of the hotel was a recitation hall and dormitory building constructed for Capital University in 1853, which had moved there from East Town Street. The move was prompted by Lincoln Goodale, president of the university board, donating the four acres of land in 1852. The cornerstone was laid on June 30, 1852, and it was completed in the fall of 1853. The new building was dedicated by numerous Lutheran church leaders and the later U.S. Secretary of State William H. Seward. After about 20 years of operations here, the school moved to the suburb of Bexley in 1873, and fully vacated the building in 1876.

Once the school left, the building had numerous expansions, to include restaurants, stores, offices, and taverns. The main portion became a hotel, with former dormitory rooms as hotel rooms. Ground was broken for the Park Hotel on August 17, 1876, with an expected completion time of autumn 1877. Construction also corresponded with improvements to High and Goodale streets, including a smooth roadway to Goodale Park.

On August 20, 1877, it was reported that the north wing of the hotel was completed.

In February 1878, a real estate holder gave a "presentation festival" at the still-unfinished hotel. He had announced gifts for those who purchased tickets, including 22 real estate gifts, as well as buggies, china tea sets, $1 gifts, and a gold watch and chain for a lady. The event was well-attended. On Independence Day in 1878, the building owner arranged fireworks, illuminated the building and park, and placed spotlights on the building's roof.

In November 1878, it was reported that the hotel would hold a grand opening on February 22, 1879, Washington's Birthday. This event was rescheduled for March 4, given the realization that a banquet held on Saturday into Sunday could keep away religious residents. About 2,000 people attended the hotel's opening event, and crowded the street all evening.

In its initial operation, the hotel was owned by Fred Michel and managed by Rush Field. By May 17, 1879, the hotel was placed in receivership, though it was stated that the hotel would not close. Michel arranged a banquet, later changed to a "grand military prize drill and brass band tournament", to raise funds, dispose of his real estate holdings, and adjust his and the hotel's financial matters. It was to be held on September 16–18, 1879. By late October, a premature statement was made that the hotel would close, though a correction indicated the owners would make changes yet keep it open. In November 1879, furniture and fixtures from the hotel were sold at auction. In 1880, Michel proposed renting the vacant hotel at a nominal rate to the government for temporary use, and he offered to donate the park space he owned west of the hotel for a new federal courthouse.

A fire in 1902 caused damages of at least $2,000 to the building at the time, and $1,500 on personal property. In December 1905, the hotel was largely vacated, with the gas turned off, after it was announced the hotel's new manager had abandoned his position. In June 1906, the Northern Hotel Company was incorporated and purchased the hotel, to be reopened on September 1, 1906 as the Northern Hotel, with renovations and an extension planned. A United Commercial Travelers (UCT) building was announced on the site between the hotel and Goodale Park in July 1906, to be designed by architects Marriott & Allen. The upper floors of the building were to be used by the hotel, while the lower floors would be used as lodge and club rooms. The buildings were also joined together by a passageway. The Northern Hotel Company's controlling members were largely UCT members, and the hotel would largely cater to these traveling men. The hotel officially reopened on October 6, 1906, after extensive renovations, and celebrated with two public receptions.

In November 1911, the hotel again closed and the Railway Y.M.C.A. signed a ten-year lease for the building and its furnishings. The Y.M.C.A. announced plans to renovate the building for its uses. In 1930, a receiver was asked to be appointed for the Y.M.C.A., given that there was an unpaid judgement held against it. In 1934, a nightclub opened in the hotel's former ballroom. In the following year, a Spiritualist church moved into the hotel's assembly room space.

By 1952, the hotel was in operation as the Goodale Hotel. Renovations in face of closure were urged by a safety director, after finding fire, health, and safety violations.

The hotel was torn down to make room for the Goodale Expressway; by this point the business was called the Goodale Hotel. The demolition contractor promised to look for the building's cornerstone and place it on display in the university's Bexley campus.

== See also ==
- Columbus Auditorium
- List of demolished buildings and structures in Columbus, Ohio
