= Malcolm Cochran =

American sculptor (born 1948)

- Born: November 20, 1948 (age 77); Pittsburgh, Pennsylvania
- Education: Wesleyan University; Cranbrook Academy of Art
- Known for: Sculpture
- Notable work: Field of Corn (1994); Goodale Park Fountain (2005-2013); Dutch Shoes (2012); Saying Good-bye to Grace (1984)

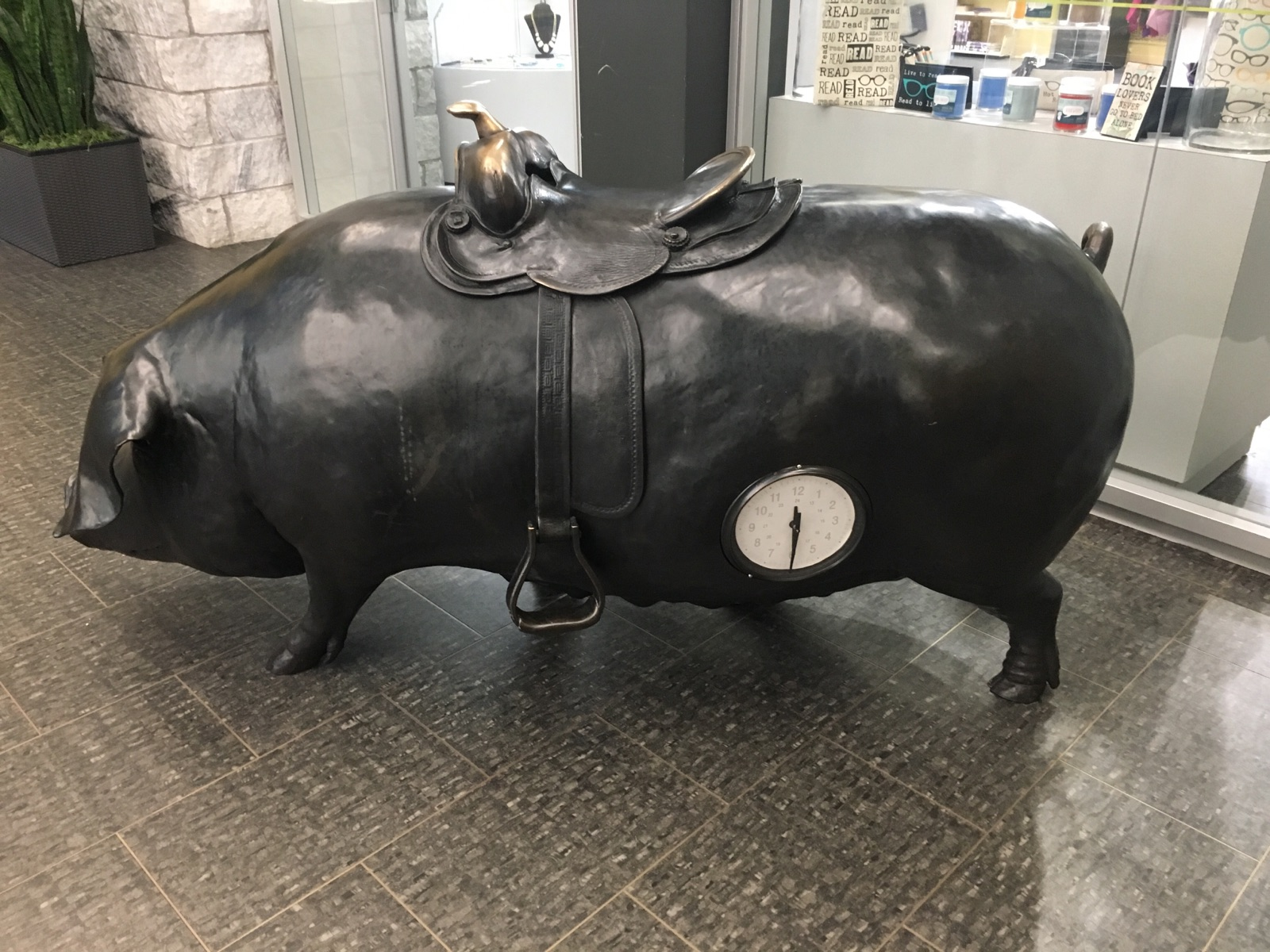
Pig Bank created by Malcolm Cochran located at the Cleveland Public Library, Louis Stokes Wing Auditorium.

Malcolm Cochran (born November 20, 1948) is an artist and former Ohio State University art professor from Columbus, Ohio. His works include Field of Corn, depicting rows of concrete corn at Frantz Park in Dublin, Ohio, inspired by Ohio's farming history. Field of Corn wasn't without controversy, however, as it garnered praiseworthy as well as critical letters to the Editor to the Columbus Dispatch. In 2006, Field of Corn was chosen as one of the nine quirkiest places to visit as part of Kimberly-Clark's Cottonelle web site Puppy Tracks promotion. It also appeared in a 2006 Weird Ohio book, made an appearance on former CNBC show Dennis Miller Live, and has been cited in educational journals and textbooks.

In New York City's Hudson River Park, Cochran created an 8' 6" X 30 wine bottle, a representation of a stateroom from a cruise ship influenced by the Queen Mary Ocean Liner. Completed in 2005, Private Passage is constructed out of steel with a green patinated zinc and bronze surface. The interior elements are stainless steel.

Cochran's Scrapyard Temple for Socrates was chosen at the 3rd Exhibition of "Artists Choose Artists," located in New York City's Socrates Sculpture Park. It had eight classical columns covered with tin cans, with an 80 ft. path of marble slabs between them. Malcolm's work was installed in 1989 and removed in 1990.

Also, Cochran created a bronze piggy bank located at the Cleveland Public Library, Louis Stokes Wing Auditorium. Originally, the piggy bank was placed in a window facing the Federal Reserve Bank of Cleveland. Cochran stated "he was inspired by the piggy bank as a symbol of fiscal responsibility."

At Harvard University's Arthur M. Sackler Museum, Malcolm's work was featured, along with nine other contemporary American artists, in the exhibition "Awards in the Visual Arts 9," that ran from November 24, 1990, through January 13, 1991.

His Cleveland Center for Contemporary Art exhibits have included The Difference Between Religion and a Relationship with Christ, which was displayed from February 27, 1993, through March 21, 1993. Cochran, an agnostic, was inspired by his daughter's Sunday school class, where the subject was discussed. Another exhibit ran from December 19, 1999, through February 6, 2000, which featured five large art installations, 10 large cast-iron dessert platters, including a Spanish Collar, an oversized birdcage, candy-colored children's bathtubs, and a floor covered with 240 clogs.

Spanish Collar and Dutch Shoes were part of Cochran's Dutch Journal work, an art project originally attended for the Netherlands. The 52 inches high by 15 feet wide Spanish Collar consisted of towels fastened around a center. Dutch Shoes had 240 pairs of shoes, which were originally made by a Dutch shoemaker from Cochran's eight prototype designs. The immaculate shoes were only characterized by their sizes and distortions.

Cochran's Goodale Park Fountain located in Columbus, Ohio was recognized as the most captivating art projects of 2013 by the Public Art Network Year in Review program. He designed it based on the park's history and the Sell's Brother "Circus House". The two elephants on top of the fountain are a salute to the history of Columbus' Sells Brothers Circus.

In 2016, Malcolm Cochran was the project coordinator for two distinctive parking lot attendants' booths in downtown Columbus.

Malcolm was awarded the International Sculpture Center's Outstanding Educator Award for 2017, with the nomination coming from a former student. Winners are selected based on their profession combining their personal creative practice and scholarly achievement. For 27 years, Cochran taught at Ohio State University, Department of Art in Foundation Studies and Sculpture, and retired in 2013. Getting an International Sculpture Award was never the incentive for Cochran's exceptional teaching practice, in which he stated, "I wanted to be a good teacher, but you can't walk into a classroom and think, 'Boy if I'm really good today, I might get an award."
