= Lincoln Goodale Monument =

Sculpture in Columbus, Ohio, U.S.

Lincoln Goodale
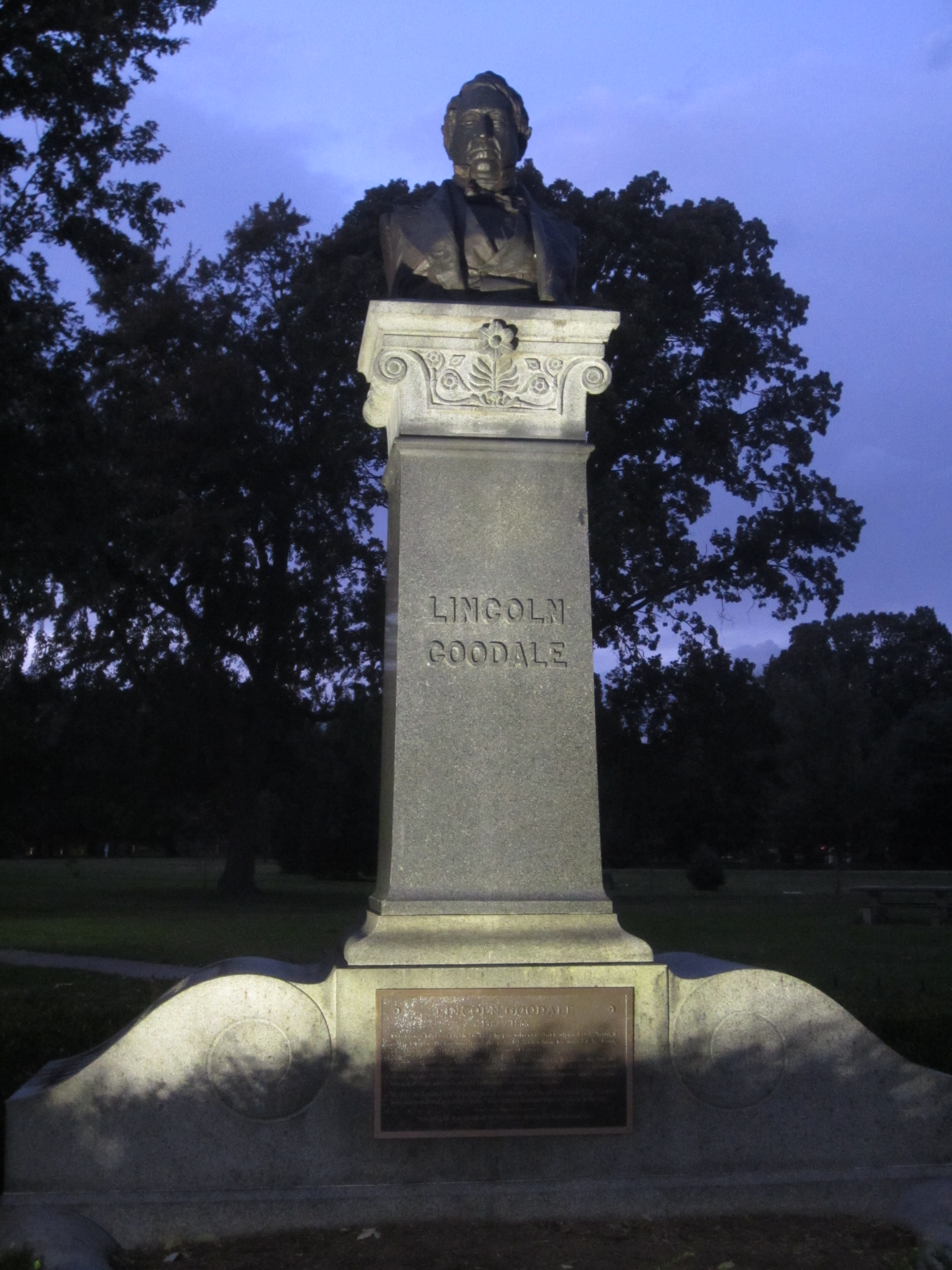
- The memorial in 2018
- Artist: John Quincy Adams Ward (sculpture); Richard Morris Hunt (base)
- Year: 1888
- Subject: Lincoln Goodale
- Location: Columbus, Ohio, United States
- 39°58′28.3″N 83°00′19.8″W

U.S. National Register of Historic Places
- Designated: June 4, 1980
- Part of: Near Northside Historic District
- Reference no.: 80003001

The Lincoln Goodale Monument (also known as Dr. Lincoln Goodale, the Goodale Monument, Lincoln Goodale, and Memorial to Lincoln Goodale, M.D.), is an 1888 bust depicting the physician of the same name, installed in Columbus, Ohio's Goodale Park, in the United States.

The work is a contributing part of the Near Northside Historic District, established in 1980.

== Description and history ==
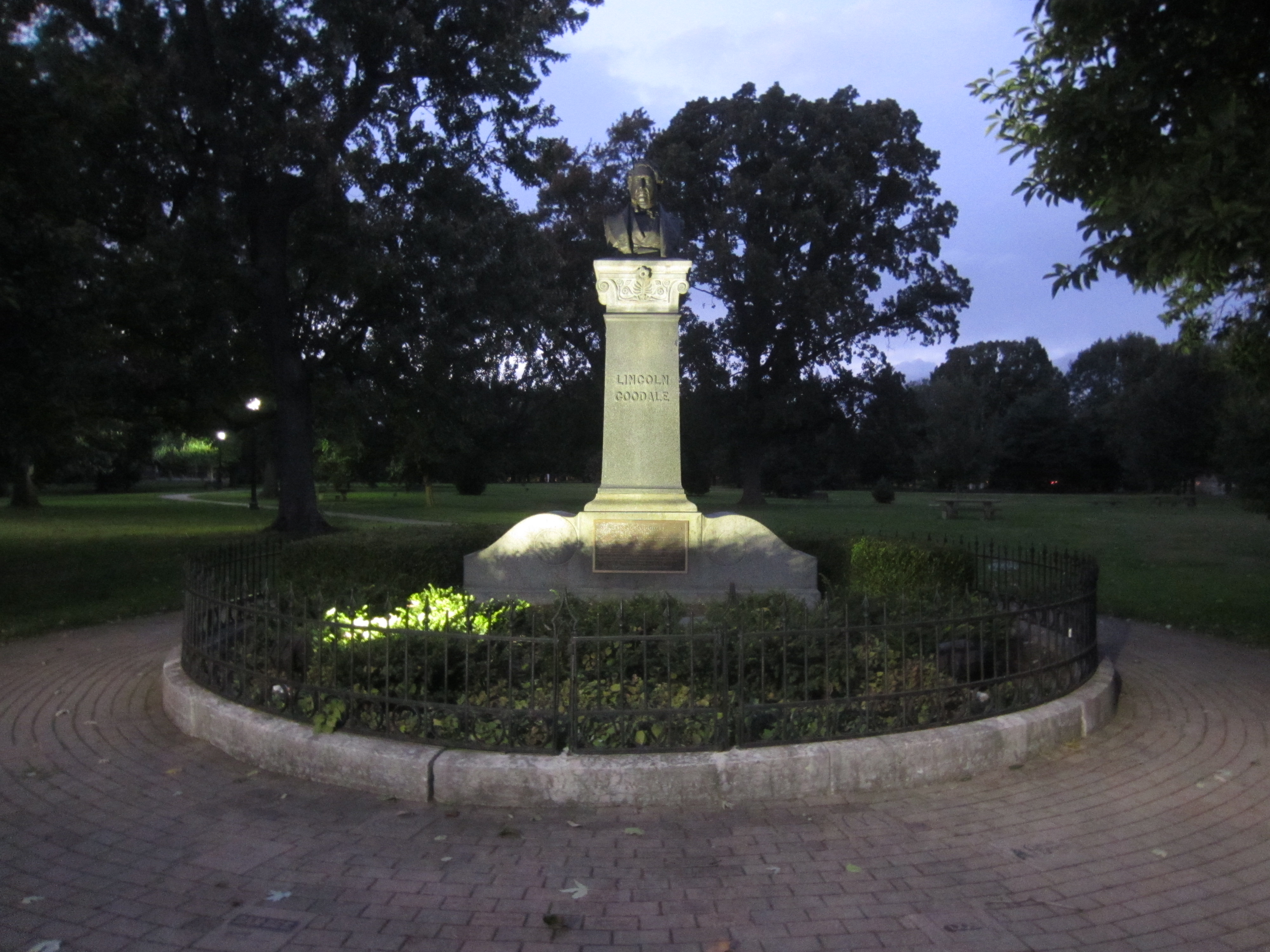
The memorial, 2018

The bust, sculpted by John Quincy Adams Ward, depicts Goodale wearing a suit and bow tie. It is made of bronze with green patina and measures approximately 3 feet (0.91 m) x 2 feet (0.61 m), 6 inches (15 cm) x 2 feet (0.61 m). The bust rests on a granite base measuring approximately 12 feet (3.7 m) x 10 feet (3.0 m) x 2 feet (0.61 m). The base was designed by Richard Morris Hunt.

There are several inscriptions. Two on the bust read "J.Q.A. WARD / Sculptor" and "CAST BY THE HENRY-BONNARD BRONZE CO. NEW YORK. 1888”. Another on the base reads: “LINCOLN / GOODALE”. A plaque on the base, donated on July 14, 1991, reads, “Lincoln Goodale 1782-1868 This bronze bust was created in 1888 by Ohio sculptor J.Q.A. Ward in memory of Dr. Lincoln Goodale, the area's first physician."

The memorial cost $5,470 and was commissioned and paid for by the city and executors of Goodale’s estate. It was designed in 1887 and dedicated on September 26, 1888. The artwork was surveyed by the Smithsonian Institution's "Save Outdoor Sculpture!" program in 1992.
