= Lincoln Goodale =

American doctor (1782–1868)

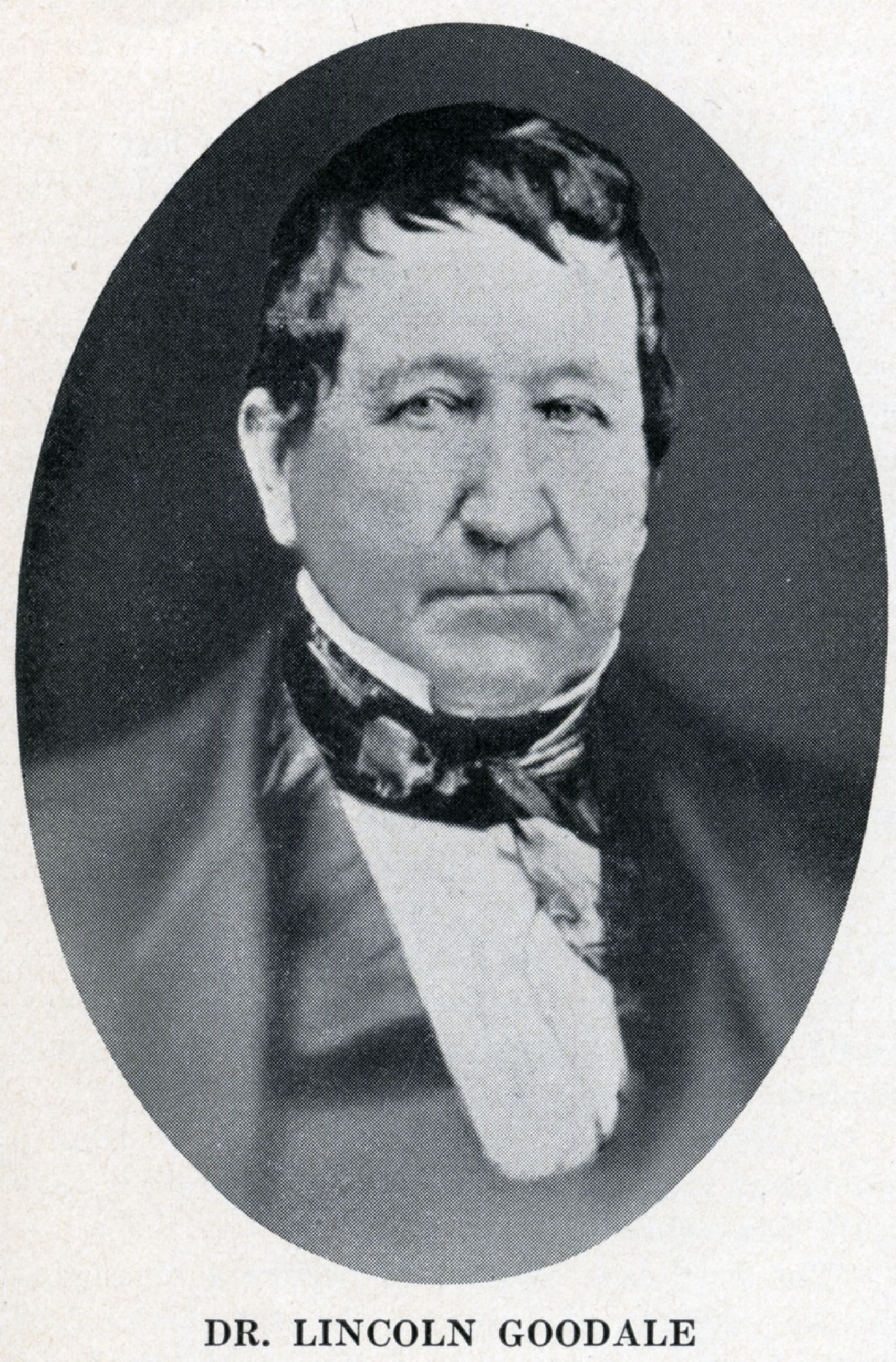
- Born: February 25, 1782; Worcester, Massachusetts, US
- Died: April 30, 1868 (aged 85); Columbus, Ohio, US
- Resting place: Green Lawn Cemetery
- Occupation: Doctor

Lincoln Goodale (February 25, 1782 – April 30, 1868) was the first medical doctor to live in Columbus, Ohio, United States. He was a great benefactor to the city and his legacy includes a large parcel of land that today is known as Goodale Park. His likeness in the form of a large bronze bust watches over the park.

== Biography ==
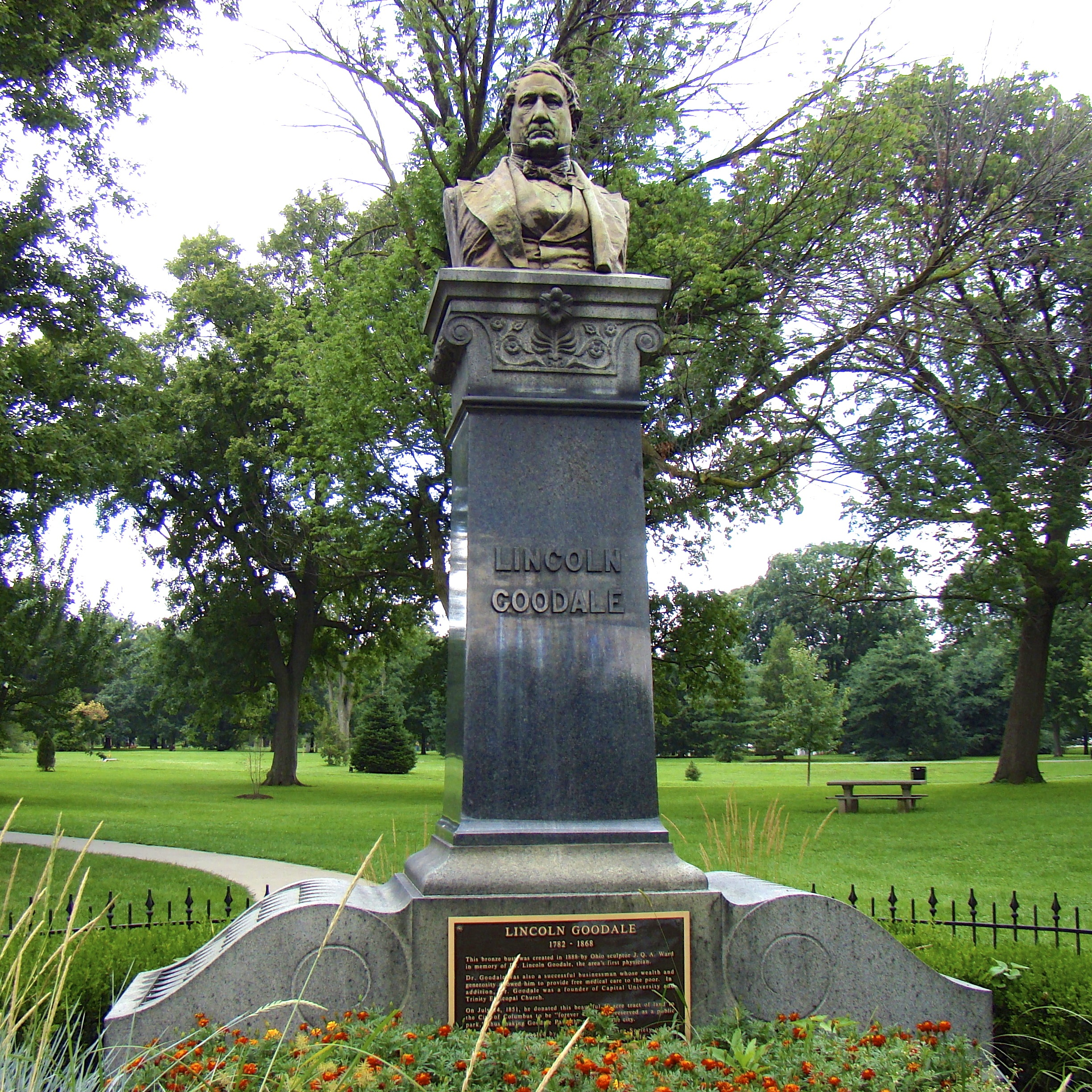
The Lincoln Goodale Monument in Goodale Park

Lincoln Goodale was born on February 25, 1782, in Worcester, Massachusetts and was a member of the first landing party in Marietta, Ohio. As a child, his father Major Nathan Goodale was killed by Native Americans during a ransom attempt and he was raised by his mother. He later received medical training from Dr. Leonard Jewett. He volunteered for the War of 1812, and served as an assistant surgeon in General Duncan MacArthur's regiment. During the war, he was held at Fort Malden in Canada.

After the War of 1812, he moved to the Franklinton neighborhood of Columbus. In Franklinton, he started his medical practice and established a general store, later using the profits to purchase land. In 1818, Goodale was grand treasurer of the Grand Lodge of Free and Accepted Masons. He later hosted Mason events in his hotel, the Goodale House.

In 1845, he joined a group to build the Franklin and Ohio railroad, intending to use his land purchases for the railroad to gain access to the city. In 1849, he became a trustee on the board for the Sterling Medical College.

On July 14, 1851, Goodale donated a 37-acre site to be used as a public park or pleasure resort which would become Goodale Park. When the park opened in 1852, it was the second largest municipal park in the country. He also donated land close to the park to Capital University, which later became part of the Park Hotel.

In 1866, he was honored by the Masons when they named their newest lodge after him.

== Death and funeral ==
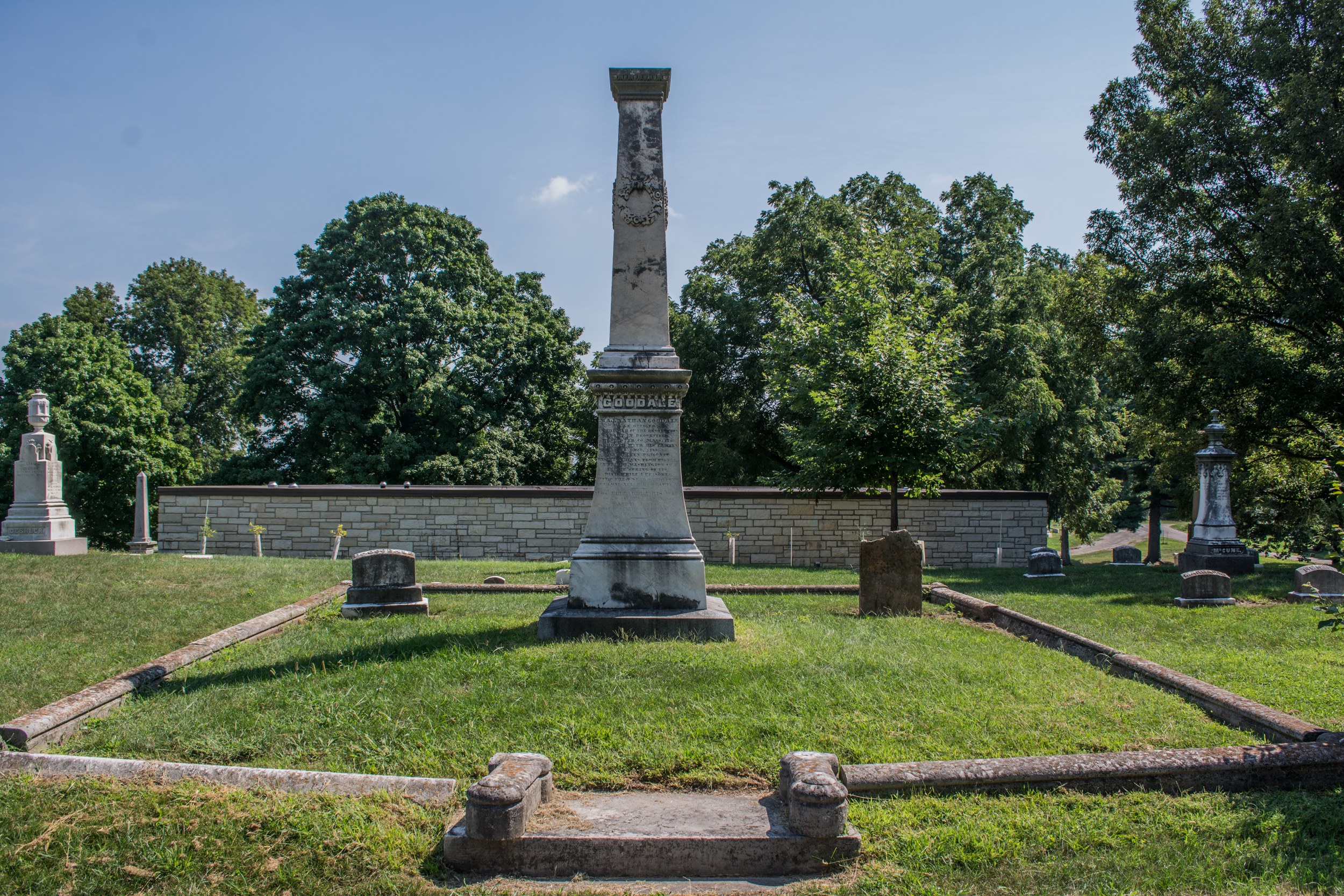
Grave (Green Lawn Cemetery)

At the time of his death, the condition of which was pneumonia, Goodale was one of the oldest citizens of Columbus and Ohio. After his death, the Ohio State Journal was quoted saying: "Rarely has any announcement been received in this city with such general expression of regret and sorrow. The news of the decease of the old man who had stood in the foremost rank of our citizens for half a century, who was so well known by boy, father, and grandfather, seemed but a few minutes in reaching every part of the city. Market men caught the word and carried it to the country, and the tale was told at breakfast at nearly every home in the city. Children, young men and old all claimed him as an associate; all knew him well."

On May 2, 1868, the date of his funeral, the Columbus City Council formed a meeting at 9 a.m. in order to determine the proper cause of death. The council then passed a public resolution recognizing his many contributions to the city and to the charities, as well as requiring the council chamber to be dressed in mourning for a period of 30 days. The city's mayor, officers and members of the council attended the funeral beginning at the Goodale family home where they joined friends, family, and the Franklin County Pioneers Association for a viewing. A funeral procession followed, leading the hearse to the First Presbyterian Church for the funeral at 10 a.m., after which, the procession continued to Green Lawn Cemetery in Columbus for interment, where he remains buried today.
