= Field of Corn =

Publicly funded art installation in Ohio

- Location: Dublin, Ohio; 40°05′06″N 83°07′24″W

Field of Corn (with Osage Orange Trees), colloquially known as Cornhenge, is a publicly funded art installation in the U.S. city of Dublin, Ohio. The installation consists of 109 concrete ears of corn positioned in rows and standing upright in a grassy field. At one end of the field are two rows of Osage-orange trees, one pre-existing and the other planted for the project. Sculpted by Malcolm Cochran, with landscaping by Stephen Drown and James Hiss, Field of Corn was commissioned by the Dublin Arts Council and completed in 1994.

The display site, named the Sam and Eulalia Frantz Park, was originally farmed by Sam Frantz, an inventor of several hybrid corn species, and was donated to the city in the late twentieth century. The art installation is partly a tribute to Sam Frantz and is also intended to remind visitors of Dublin's agricultural heritage. Along the west side of the park, near the Osage orange trees, are signs that describe the project and explain hybridization.

Three different molds were used to cast the concrete ears of corn, which stand about 6 feet (1.8 m) tall. The breed of corn represented is known as Corn Belt Dent Corn, a double-cross hybrid variety. The ears are rotated in several directions to make it appear as if each ear is unique. They were cast at a precast concrete manufacturer, Cook & Ingle Co., in Dalton, Georgia. Each ear weighs 1,500 lb (680 kg)

Field of Corn has become a popular piece of public art in the Central Ohio Community. The display received "Best of Columbus" honors by readers of Columbus Monthly magazine each year of its nomination since 2008, including four #1 awards as best public artwork in central Ohio.
