= ComFest =

Music and arts festival in Ohio, US

- The 2007 ComFest logo, designed by Jason Kroninger
- Status: active
- Genre: festivals
- Frequency: Annually
- Venue: Goodale Park
- Location: Columbus, Ohio
- Coordinates: 39°58′31″N 83°0′24″W
- Country: United States
- Years active: 53–54
- Inaugurated: 1972
- Website: www.comfest.com

ComFest (officially The Community Festival) is a free, non-corporate, music and arts annual festival currently held each June at Goodale Park in the Victorian Village area of Columbus, Ohio.

== Description ==
The festival bills itself as "The Party with a Purpose". To accomplish this goal, the festival relies on community members to work together in the planning and operation of the festival serving on committees and work teams including clean-up and recycling, safety and first aid, entertainment, street fair, and the "World Peace Rocks Forever Committee".

== History ==
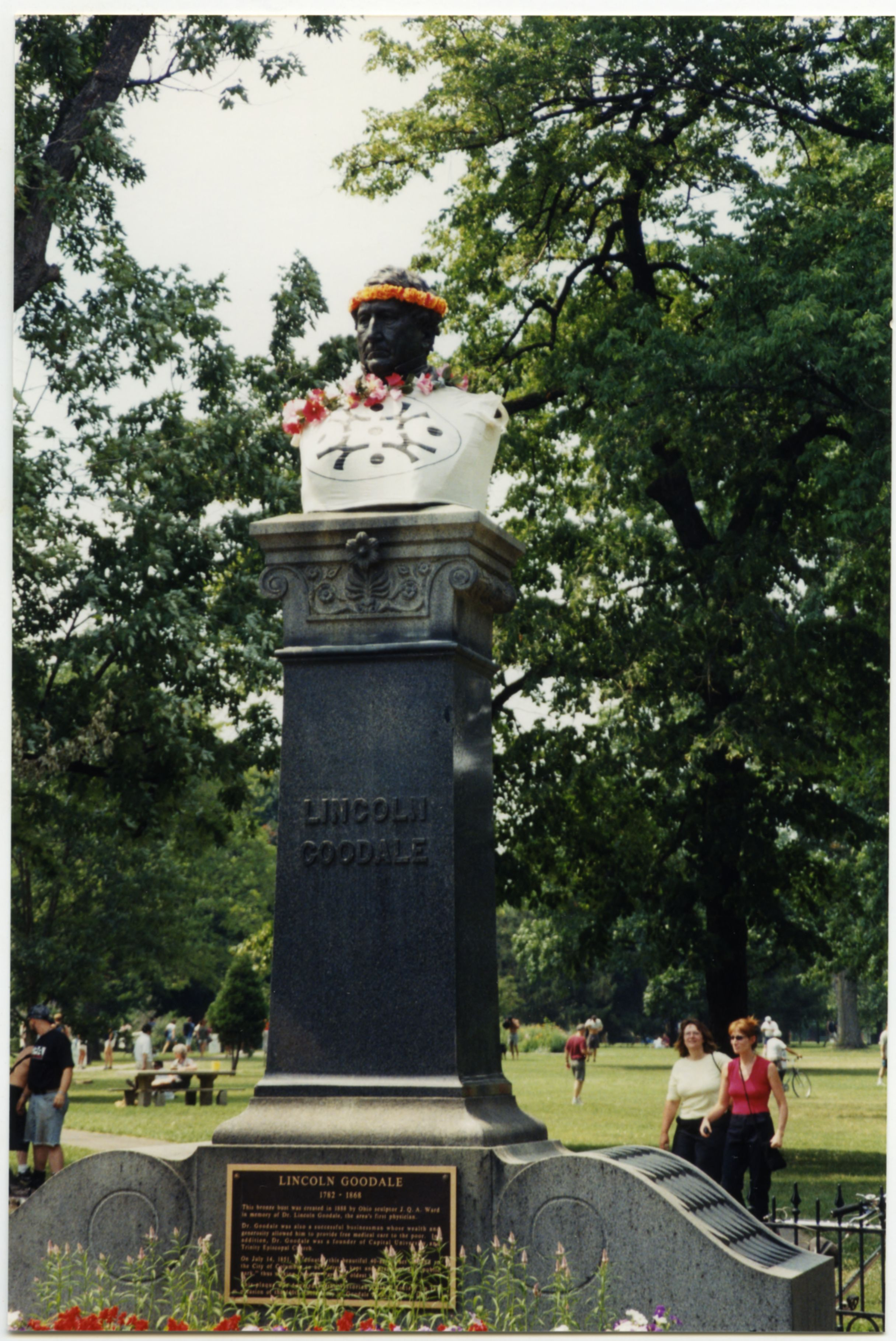
The Lincoln Goodale bust in Goodale Park adorned for ComFest and the holidays

The festival was first held in 1972 as a showcase for a collection of community organizations including the Columbus Free Press, Free Health Clinic, Food Co-op, Tenants Union, Crisis Hotline, and Recycling Center. The festival continues to provide a forum for alternative lifestyles and collective activity.

Beer from the Columbus Brewing Company is sold in large, colorful mugs to fund the cost of the festival itself and to raise money for community projects and grants. All tips from the beer booths go to homeless shelters.

The 45th ComFest was held June 23–25, 2017. Its theme was "The people united will never be defeated." The featured organization was Community Refugee & Immigration Services; the honored artist was fiddler and singer Megan Palmer.

The 48th ComFest will go virtual for the first time in 2020, as most live events were cancelled caused by the COVID-19 pandemic.

The 50th ComFest returned to Goodale Park June 24–26, 2022.

The 54th ComFest will be held June 26–28, 2026.
