= Goodale Park =

Park in Columbus, Ohio, U.S.

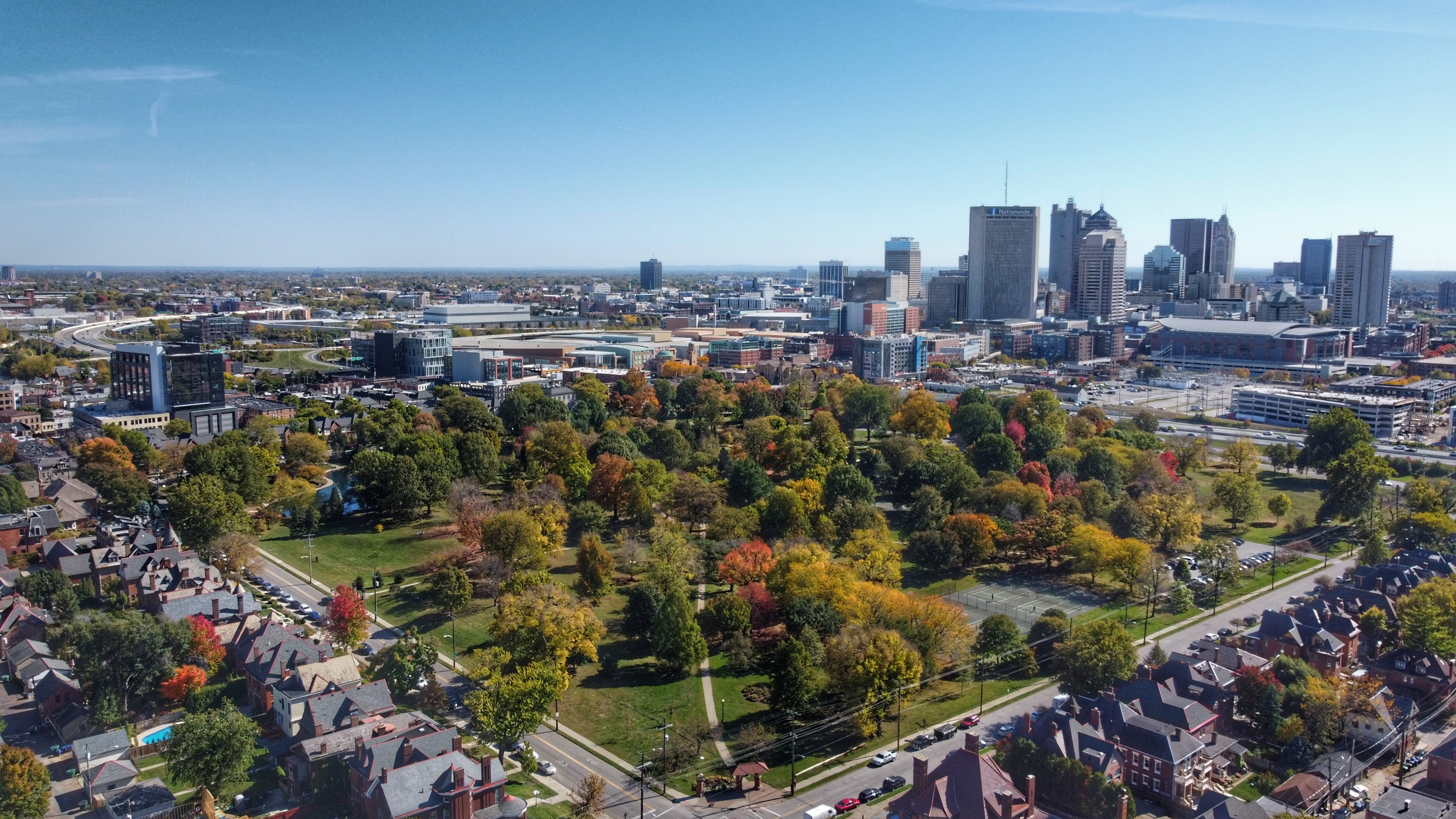
- Interactive map of Goodale Park
- Type: Public
- Location: Columbus, Ohio
- Coordinates: 39°58′31″N 83°00′24″W
- Area: 32.56 acres (13.18 ha)
- Elevation: 751 feet (229 m)
- Administrator: Columbus Recreation and Parks Department
- Public transit: 1, 2, 5, 8, Night Owl; CoGo
- Website: goodalepark.org

Goodale Park is a public park in the Victorian Village neighborhood of Columbus, Ohio. It was donated to the city in 1851 by Lincoln Goodale. For a few months during the Civil War, it was a staging area for Union troops known as Camp Jackson. ComFest, a large, free, multi-day, non-corporate, music and arts annual festival, is held in the park in June.

Located immediately north of downtown Columbus, the park is bordered by Buttles Avenue on the North, Park Street on the East, Goodale Street on the South, and Dennison Avenue on the West. Goodale Park features a pond with a fountain, a gazebo, four (4) tennis courts, three (3) pickleball courts, a basketball court, a children's playground, a shelter house, and more.

The park contributes to the Near Northside Historic District, on the National Register of Historic Places.

== History ==
=== Early history ===
The 37-acre site was donated by Dr. Lincoln Goodale on July 14, 1851, to be used as a public park or pleasure resort. He had originally purchased the property for railroads to gain access to the city. When the park opened in 1852 featuring a wooded grove of trees, it was the second largest municipal park in the country, the first at the time being Boston Common.

=== Camp Jackson during the Civil War ===
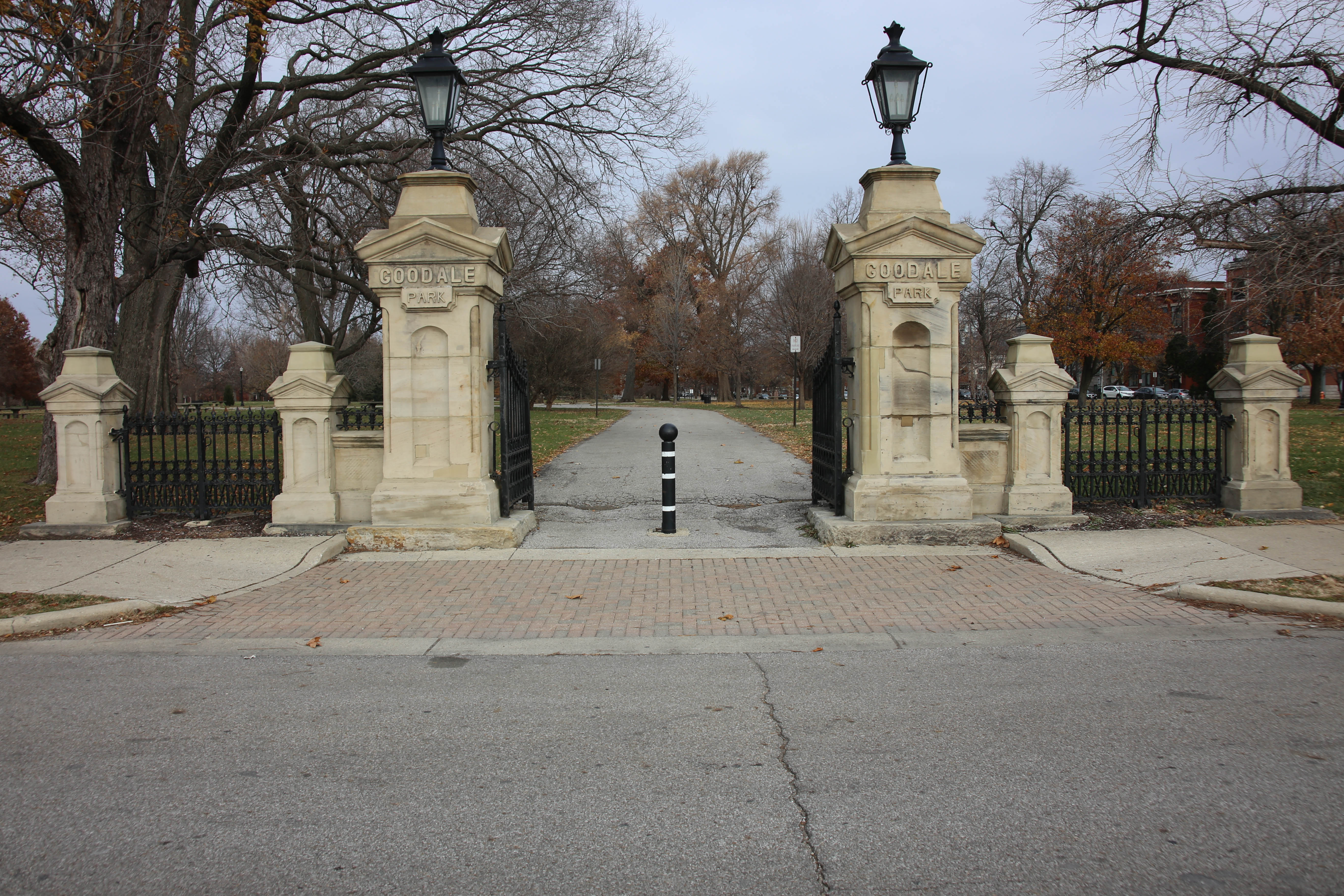
Gates dating to the 1860s

From April to June 1861, the park was used as a staging area for new recruits for the Union Army at the request of three city councilmen. The camp started in April when Governor William Dennison, at the urging of President Lincoln, called on Ohio communities to revive their militias and send them to Columbus.

"A high picket fence is erected around the camp, and the curious public mills around all day. Few visitors are allowed in. There are reports that the troops eat very well while in the camp."

The Governor's Guards, a corps of soldiers stationed at the camp, marched through Columbus on a Saturday morning to urge the local people to show their patriotism and enlist in the cause. A Captain Morrow was particularly successful: his company grew so large from new recruits that he started a second company, and was nearly able to fill that one as well. "Any young man interested in enlisting in this company, "B" of the 3rd Regiment, is told to call at Camp Jackson at an early hour."

In June, Camp Jackson's military operations are transferred to Camp Chase, 4 miles (6.4 km) west of Columbus, and Camp Jackson reverts to being a public park. During its peak, about 8,000 troops were stationed at the camp. Among the officers stationed at the camp were two future presidents: Rutherford B. Hayes and William McKinley.

=== Post-Civil War ===
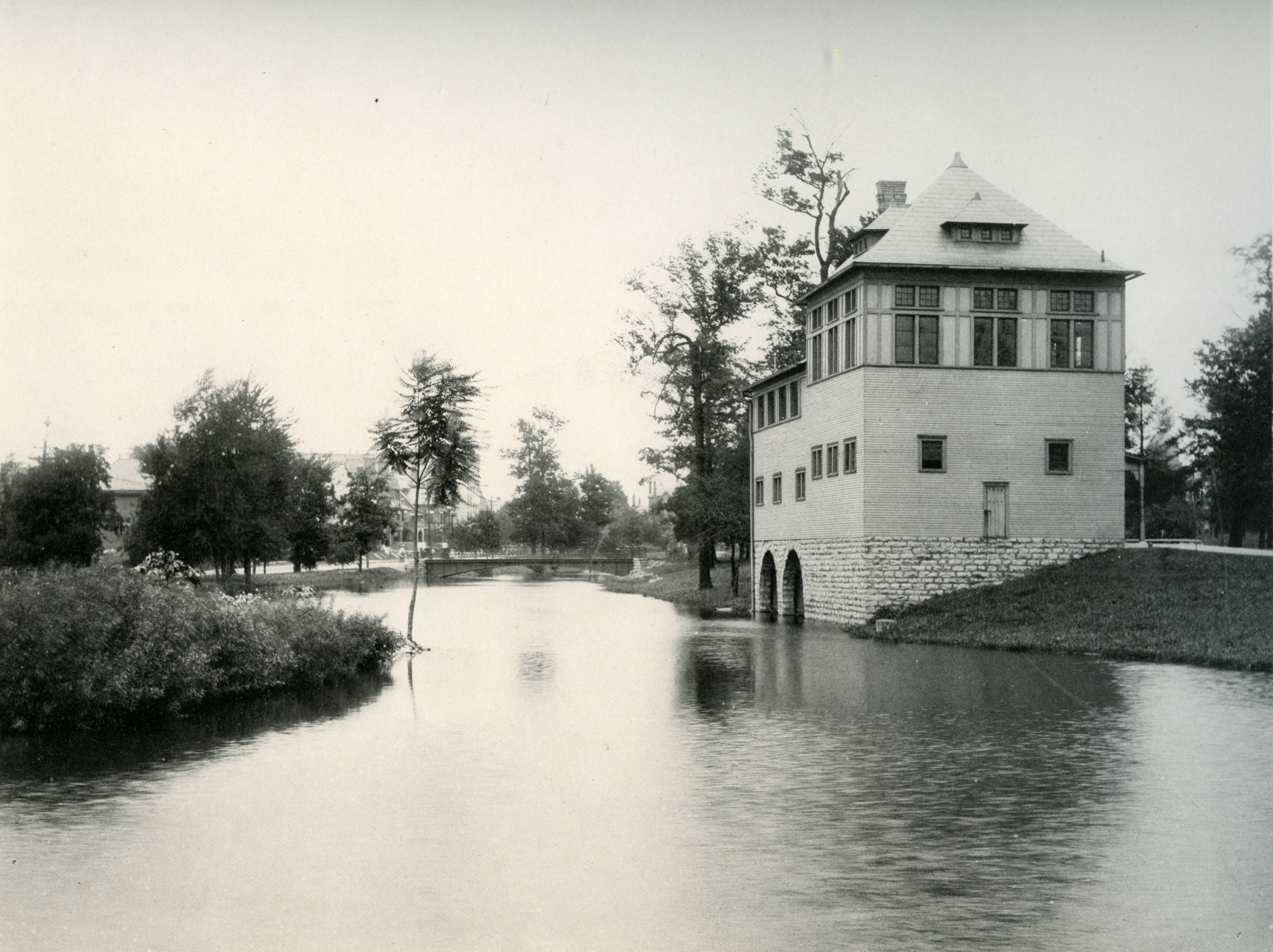
Lake and boathouse c. 1897

After the Civil War, the park was under construction until 1875 for the creation of a carriage drive, landscaping inspired by Andrew Jackson Downing, and a lake house. Starting in 1874 during construction, the park exhibited various animals to draw children and their guardians to the park. In 1888, a bronze bust, the Lincoln Goodale Monument, was erected in the park commemorating Dr. Goodale's gift to the city. The monument's pedestal was designed by Richard Morris Hunt, the same man who designed the pedestal for the Statue of Liberty.

From 1900 to the 1950s, the park faced multiple challenges for development, including a site for Memorial Hall, a Carnegie Library, a branch library, and a bus garage. In July 1910, the park once again hosted troops when the Ohio National Guard was called in to quell a streetcar strike when it looked to turn violent. The troops stayed for two weeks and after their departure, the worst violence of the strike erupted.

In the 1970s and 1980s, economic downturn negatively affected the park, making it unsafe and unmaintained. In the mid-1980s, the Columbus Recreation and Parks Department began installing train tracks in the park (from a former Columbus Zoo train) and neighbors reacted and began organizing to have a say in the park's direction. In 1987, the Friends of Goodale Park was officially formed to maintain and preserve the park. In 2004, they began the restoration of the Goodale Gates, erected during the park's time as Camp Jackson.

The Goodale Park fountain was designed by Malcolm Cochran and was completed in 2013. It integrates the park's history and the Sell's Brother Circus House at the corner of Dennison and Buttles Avenues. The two elephants on top of the fountain are a salute to the history of Columbus' Sells Brothers Circus.

== Park amenities ==
Park facilities include a pond with a fountain, a gazebo, four (4) tennis courts, three (3) pickleball courts, a basketball court, a kickball field, a children's playground, a shelter house, and more The shelter house and gazebo both have Victorian-style architecture. The park is home to two Champion Trees: a Chinese catalpa and Smoothleaf elm.

== Gallery ==
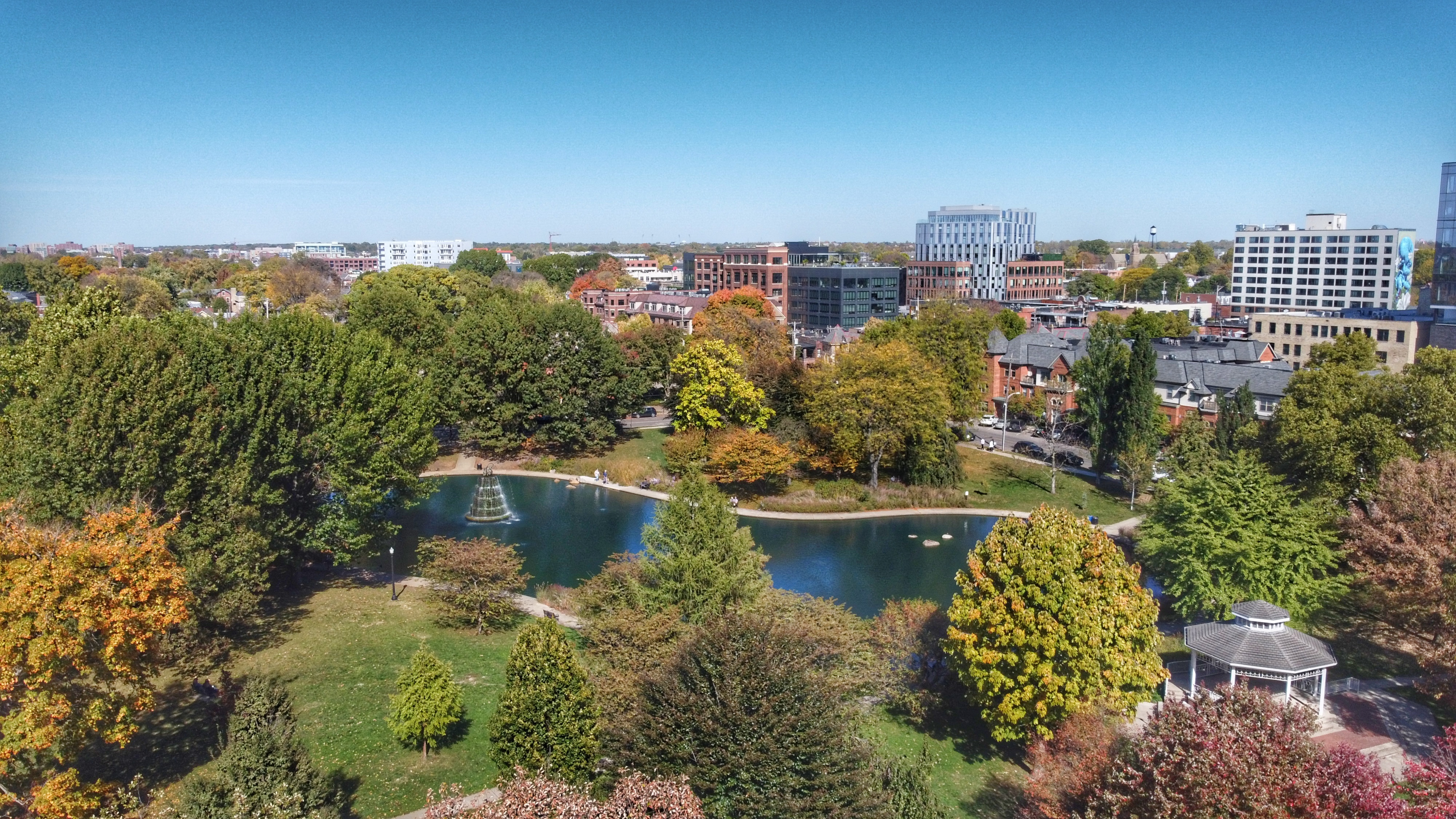
Pond and gazebo

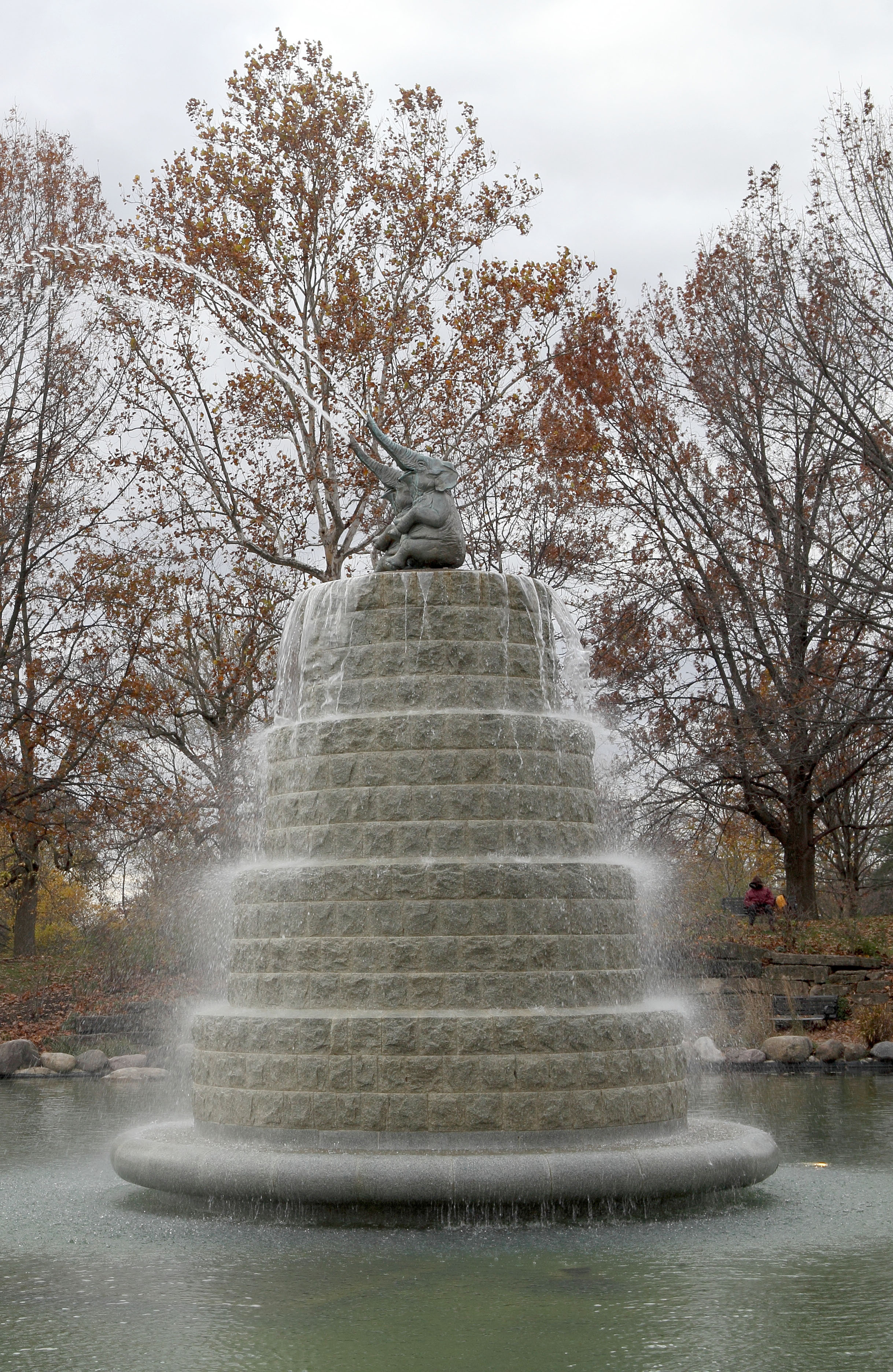
Goodale Park Fountain in the fall

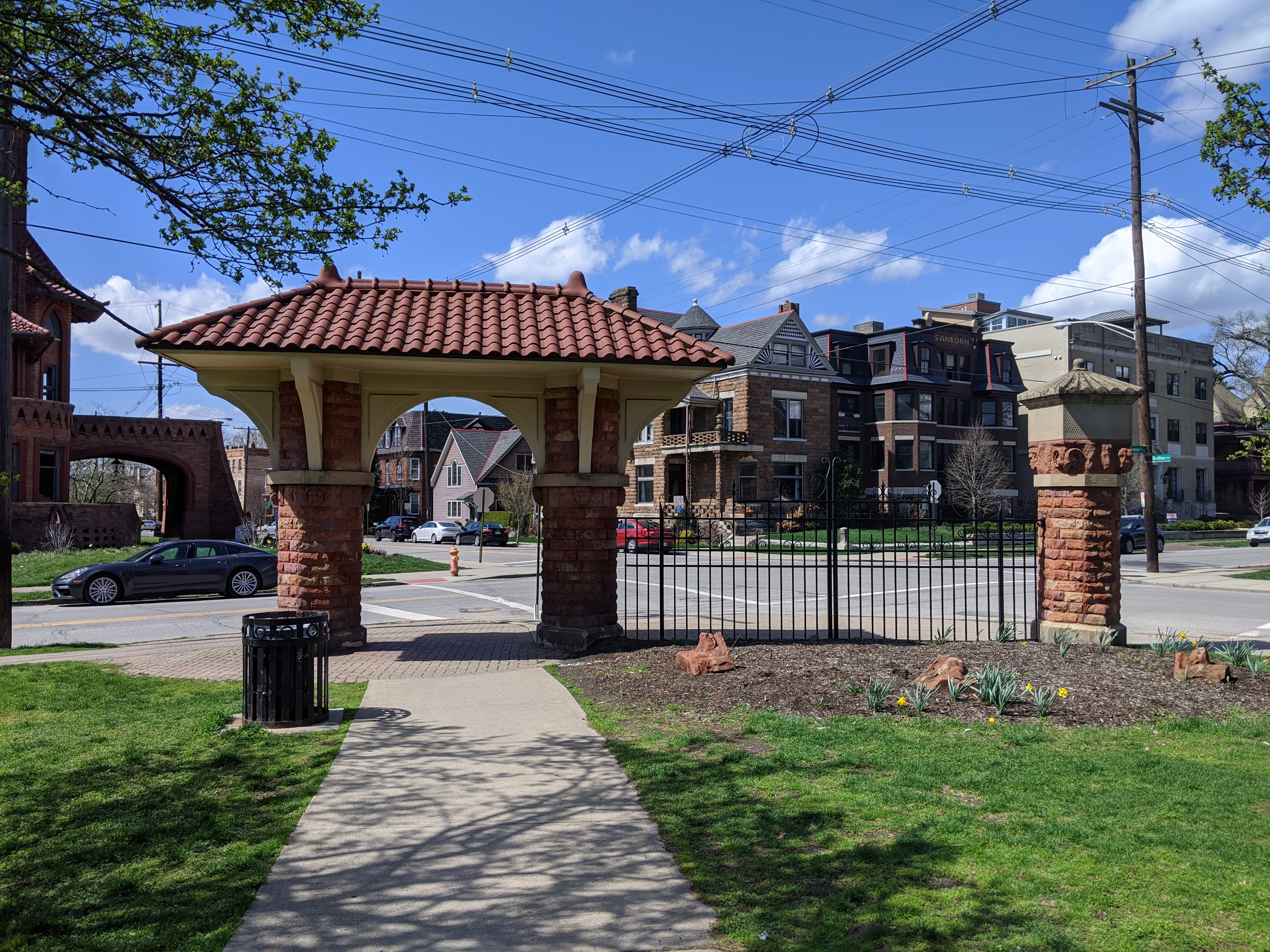
William H. Fish Gate, with the Fish House directly behind it and the Circus House arched driveway to the left

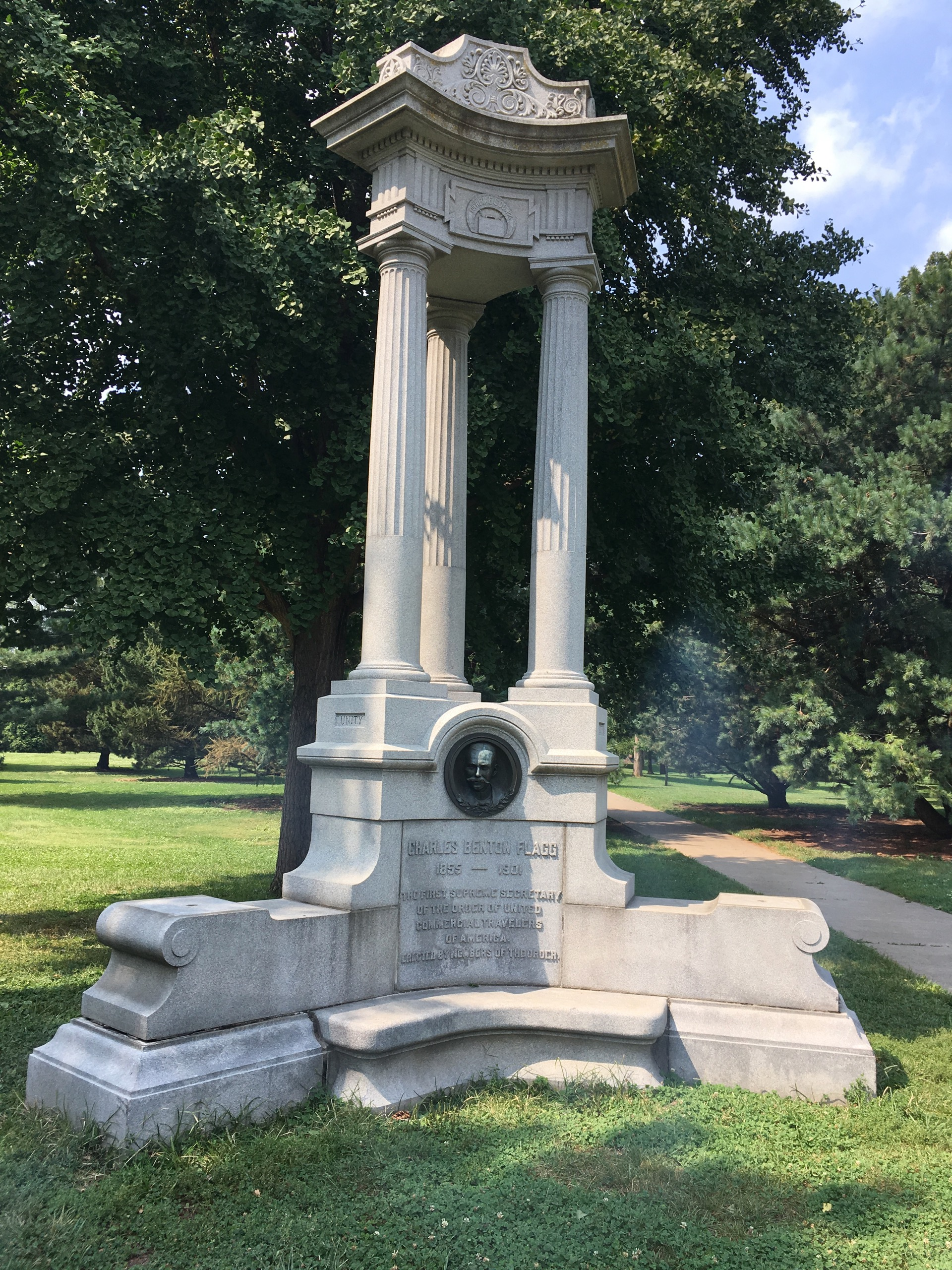
Charles Benton Flagg Memorial, on the east side of the park

== See also ==
- List of parks in Columbus, Ohio
