= Richard S. Whaley =

American politician and jurist (1874–1951)

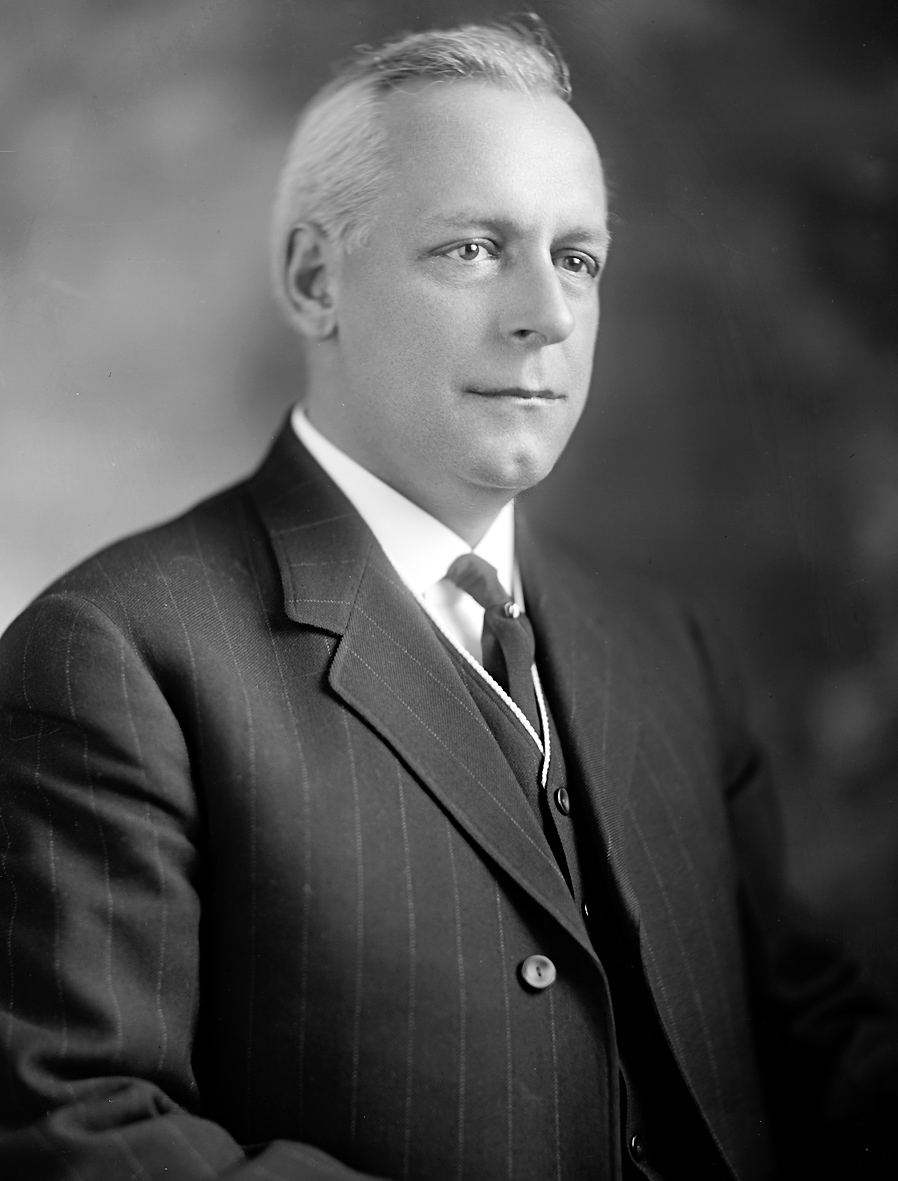

Senior Judge of the United States Court of Claims
- In office July 9, 1947 – November 8, 1951

Chief Justice of the Court of Claims
- In office June 27, 1939 – July 9, 1947
- Appointed by: Franklin D. Roosevelt
- Preceded by: Fenton Whitlock Booth
- Succeeded by: John Marvin Jones

Judge of the Court of Claims
- In office June 2, 1930 – June 27, 1939
- Appointed by: Herbert Hoover
- Preceded by: Samuel Jordan Graham
- Succeeded by: Samuel Estill Whitaker

Member of the U.S. House of Representatives from South Carolina's 1st district
- In office April 29, 1913 – March 3, 1921
- Preceded by: George Swinton Legaré
- Succeeded by: W. Turner Logan

41st Speaker of the South Carolina House of Representatives
- In office January 8, 1907 – February 19, 1910
- Governor: Duncan Clinch Heyward; Martin Frederick Ansel
- Preceded by: Mendel Lafayette Smith
- Succeeded by: Mendel Lafayette Smith

Member of the South Carolina House of Representatives from Charleston County
- In office February 14, 1913 – April 29, 1913
- In office January 8, 1901 – February 19, 1910

Personal details
- Born: Richard Smith Whaley; July 15, 1874 Charleston, South Carolina, U.S.
- Died: November 8, 1951 (aged 77) Charleston, South Carolina, U.S.
- Resting place: Magnolia Cemetery; Charleston, South Carolina
- Party: Democratic
- Education: University of Virginia School of Law (LL.B.)

Richard Smith Whaley (July 15, 1874 – November 8, 1951) was a United States representative from South Carolina and chief justice of the Court of Claims.

== Education and career ==
Born on July 15, 1874, in Charleston, South Carolina, Whaley attended the Episcopal High School in Alexandria, Virginia. He received a Bachelor of Laws in 1897 from the University of Virginia School of Law. He was admitted to the bar and entered private practice in Charleston from 1897 to 1913. He was a member of the South Carolina House of Representatives from 1900 to 1913, serving as Speaker from 1907 to 1910 and as Speaker Pro Tempore in 1913.

=== Football coach ===
In 1896, Whaley served as the first head coach of the University of South Carolina football team. During his one season with the Gamecocks, he compiled an overall record of one win and three losses (1–3).

== Congressional service ==
Whaley was presiding officer of the South Carolina Democratic state convention in 1910 and of the Democratic city convention in 1911. He was a delegate to the Democratic National Conventions in 1912 and 1920. He was elected as a Democrat to the United States House of Representatives of the 63rd United States Congress to fill the vacancy caused by the death of United States Representative George Swinton Legaré. He reelected to the 64th, 65th and 66th United States Congresses and served from April 29, 1913, to March 3, 1921. He was not a candidate for renomination in 1920.

== Later career ==
Whaley returned to private practice in Charleston from 1921 to 1923. He was Chairman of the District of Columbia Rent Commission from 1923 to 1925.

== Federal judicial service ==
Whaley was a Trial Judge of the Court of Claims from 1925 to 1930.

Whaley was nominated by President Herbert Hoover on May 23, 1930, to a Judge seat on the Court of Claims vacated by Judge Samuel Jordan Graham. He was confirmed by the United States Senate on June 2, 1930, and received his commission the same day. His service terminated on June 27, 1939, due to his elevation to Chief Justice of the same court.

Whaley was nominated by President Franklin D. Roosevelt on June 23, 1939, to the Chief Justice seat on the Court of Claims (United States Court of Claims from June 25, 1948) vacated by Chief Justice Fenton W. Booth. He was confirmed by the United States Senate on June 26, 1939, and received his commission on June 27, 1939. He assumed senior status on July 9, 1947. His service terminated on November 8, 1951, due to his death in Charleston. He was interred in Magnolia Cemetery in Charleston.

== Sources ==
- The United States Court of Claims : a history / pt. 1. The judges, 1855-1976 / by Marion T. Bennett / pt. 2. Origin, development, jurisdiction, 1855-1978 / W. Cowen, P. Nichols, M.T. Bennett. Washington, D.C.: Committee on the Bicentennial of Independence and the Constitution of the Judicial Conference of the United States. 1976.

U.S. House of Representatives
Preceded by George Swinton Legaré	Member of the U.S. House of Representatives from South Carolina's 1st congressional district 1913–1921	Succeeded by W. Turner Logan
Legal offices
Preceded by Samuel Jordan Graham	Judge of the Court of Claims; 1930–1939	Succeeded by Samuel Estill Whitaker
Preceded by Fenton Whitlock Booth	Chief Justice of the Court of Claims; 1939–1947	Succeeded by John Marvin Jones
