= Stanton J. Peelle =

American politician and jurist

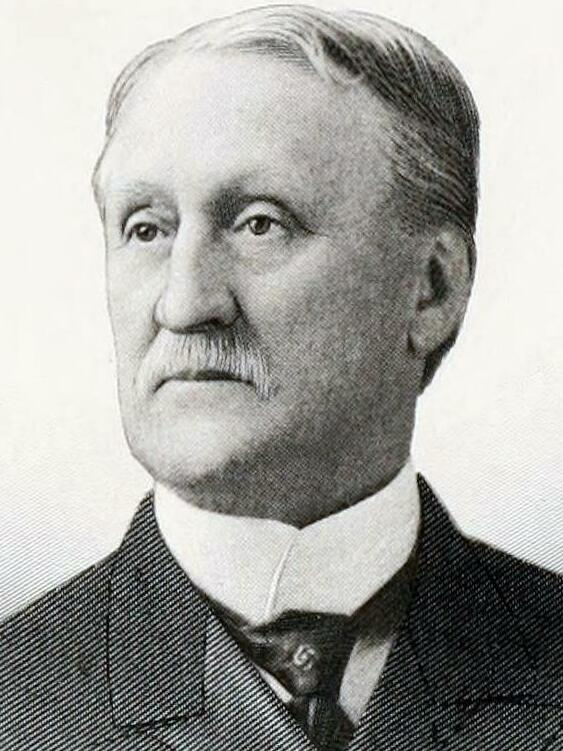

Chief Justice of the Court of Claims
- In office December 20, 1905 – February 11, 1913
- Appointed by: Theodore Roosevelt
- Preceded by: Charles C. Nott
- Succeeded by: Edward Kernan Campbell

Associate Judge of the Court of Claims
- In office March 28, 1892 – December 20, 1905
- Appointed by: Benjamin Harrison
- Preceded by: Glenni William Scofield
- Succeeded by: Samuel S. Barney

Member of the U.S. House of Representatives from Indiana's 7th district
- In office March 4, 1881 – May 22, 1884
- Preceded by: Gilbert De La Matyr
- Succeeded by: William E. English

Personal details
- Born: Stanton Judkins Peelle; February 11, 1843 Richmond, Indiana, U.S.
- Died: September 4, 1928 (aged 85) Washington, D.C., U.S.
- Resting place: Rock Creek Cemetery; Washington, D.C., U.S.
- Party: Republican
- Education: Winchester Seminary; Valparaiso University read law
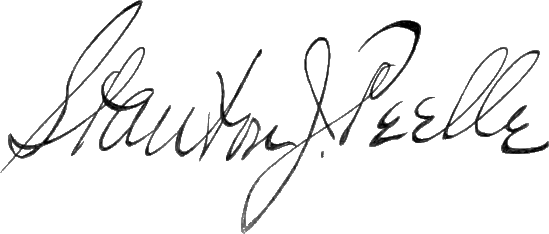
- Signature

Stanton Judkins Peelle (February 11, 1843 – September 4, 1928) was an American politician and judge who served as a United States representative from Indiana and as an associate judge and chief justice of the Court of Claims.

== Education and career ==
Born on February 11, 1843, in Richmond, Wayne County, Indiana, Peelle attended the common schools and Winchester Seminary in Indiana, then attended Northern Indiana Normal School (now Valparaiso University). He enlisted in Company G, Eighth Regiment, Indiana Volunteers on August 5, 1861, and served until near the close of the American Civil War, as a corporal and second lieutenant. He read law with William A. Peelle in Centerville, Indiana, in 1866. He entered private practice in Winchester, Indiana, from 1866 to 1869. He continued private practice in Indianapolis, Indiana, from 1869 to 1892. A notable partner at his Indianapolis firm was William L. Taylor, who would later become Indiana Attorney General. He was an assistant district attorney for Marion County, Indiana from 1872 to 1873. He was a member of the Indiana House of Representatives from 1878 to 1879.

== Congressional service ==
Peelle was elected as a Republican from Indiana's 7th congressional district to the United States House of Representatives of the 47th United States Congress, serving from March 4, 1881, to March 3, 1883. He presented credentials as a member-elect to the 48th United States Congress and served from March 4, 1883, to May 22, 1884, when he was succeeded by United States Representative William E. English, who contested his election.

He was a delegate to the 1892 Republican National Convention.

== Federal judicial service ==
Peelle was nominated by President Benjamin Harrison on March 24, 1892, to a judgeship on the Court of Claims (later the United States Court of Claims) vacated by Judge Glenni William Scofield. He was confirmed by the United States Senate on March 28, 1892, and received his commission the same day.

On December 19, 1905, President Theodore Roosevelt nominated Peelle to succeed Charles C. Nott as the court's Chief Justice. Peelle was confirmed by the Senate on December 20, 1905, and received his commission the same day. On January 2, 1906, he became Chief Justice.

He ultimately resigned his post and stepped down on February 11, 1913.

=== Other service ===
While serving as a federal judge in Washington, D.C., Peelle served as a law professor at George Washington University Law School from 1901 to 1911. He served as a member of the Board of Trustees of Howard University from 1906 to 1925. He was president of the Board of Trustees of Washington College of Law (then an independent law school) from 1910 to 1925.

== Death ==
Peelle died on September 4, 1928, in Washington, D.C. He was interred in the city's Rock Creek Cemetery.

== Sources ==
- United States Congress. "Stanton J. Peelle (id: P000185)". Biographical Directory of the United States Congress.
- "Peelle, Stanton Judkins - Federal Judicial Center". www.fjc.gov.
- The United States Court of Claims : a history / pt. 1. The judges, 1855-1976 / by Marion T. Bennett / pt. 2. Origin, development, jurisdiction, 1855-1978 / W. Cowen, P. Nichols, M.T. Bennett. Washington, D.C.: Committee on the Bicentennial of Independence and the Constitution of the Judicial Conference of the United States. 1976.
- This article incorporates public domain material from Biographical Directory of the United States Congress. Federal government of the United States.

U.S. House of Representatives
| Preceded by Gilbert De La Matyr | Member of the U.S. House of Representatives from Indiana's 7th congressional district 1881–1884 | Succeeded by William E. English |
Legal offices
| Preceded by Glenni William Scofield | Judge of the Court of Claims; 1892–1906 | Succeeded by Samuel S. Barney |
| Preceded by Charles C. Nott | Chief Justice of the Court of Claims; 1905–1913 | Succeeded by Edward Kernan Campbell |
