= Don Nelson Laramore =

American judge (1906–1989)

Senior Judge of the United States Court of Appeals for the Federal Circuit
- In office October 1, 1982 – August 9, 1989

Senior Judge of the United States Court of Claims
- In office January 17, 1972 – October 1, 1982

Judge of the United States Court of Claims
- In office March 17, 1954 – January 17, 1972
- Appointed by: Dwight D. Eisenhower
- Preceded by: George Evan Howell
- Succeeded by: Robert Lowe Kunzig

Personal details
- Born: Don Nelson Laramore; December 22, 1906 Starke County, Indiana, U.S.
- Died: August 9, 1989 (aged 82) Washington, D.C., U.S.
- Education: University of Chicago; Indiana Law School

Don Nelson Laramore (December 22, 1906 – August 9, 1989) was a judge of the United States Court of Claims and later a United States Circuit Judge of the United States Court of Appeals for the Federal Circuit.

== Education and career ==
Born on December 22, 1906, in Starke County, Indiana, Laramore attended the University of Chicago and the Indiana Law School (now the Indiana University Robert H. McKinney School of Law). He was an official court reporter for the Indiana Circuit Court for the Forty-Fourth Judicial Circuit from 1925 to 1936. He was an attorney for the claims department of the Nickel Plate Railroad, Pennsylvania Railroad and New York Central Railroad from 1936 to 1942. He was a judge of the Indiana Circuit Court for the Forty Fourth Judicial Circuit from 1942 to 1954.

== Federal judicial service ==
Laramore was nominated by President Dwight D. Eisenhower on February 15, 1954, to a seat on the United States Court of Claims vacated by Judge George Evan Howell. He was confirmed by the United States Senate on March 16, 1954, and received his commission on March 17, 1954. He assumed senior status on January 17, 1972. Laramore was reassigned by operation of law to the United States Court of Appeals for the Federal Circuit on October 1, 1982, pursuant to 96 Stat. 25. His service terminated on August 9, 1989, due to his death in Washington, D.C.

== Sources ==
- Bennett, Marion T. (1991). The United States Court of Appeals for the Federal Circuit: A History, 1982–1990. Washington, D.C.: United States Judicial Conference Committee on the Bicentennial of the Constitution of the United States. p. 83. LCCN 91601231.

Legal offices
Preceded by George Evan Howell	Judge of the United States Court of Claims; 1954–1972	Succeeded by Robert Lowe Kunzig
