= Benjamin Horsley Littleton =

American judge (1889–1966)

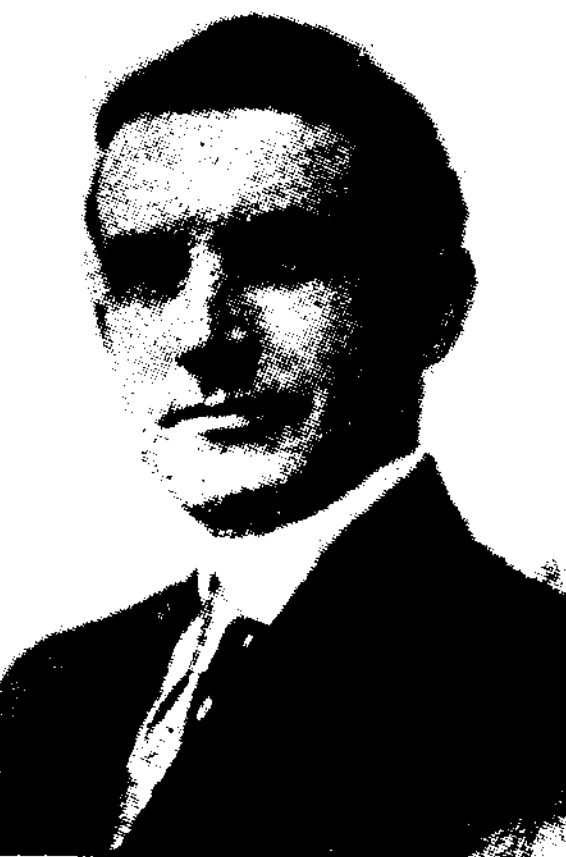
- Littleton in 1926

Senior Judge of the United States Court of Claims
- In office October 31, 1958 – July 6, 1966

Judge of the United States Court of Claims
- In office November 6, 1929 – October 31, 1958
- Appointed by: Herbert Hoover
- Preceded by: J. McKenzie Moss
- Succeeded by: James Randall Durfee

Personal details
- Born: Benjamin Horsley Littleton; August 27, 1889 Weatherford, Texas, U.S.
- Died: July 6, 1966 (aged 76) Washington, D.C., U.S.
- Education: Cumberland School of Law (LLB)

Benjamin Horsley Littleton (August 27, 1889 – July 6, 1966) was an American judge of the United States Board of Tax Appeals (later the United States Tax Court) from 1924 to 1929, and of the United States Court of Claims.

== Education and career ==
Born to a pioneer family in Weatherford, Texas, Littleton was raised to be a farmer, but developed an interest in the law and began reading law in pursuit of the profession. He graduated from a business college and received a Bachelor of Laws from Cumberland School of Law (then part of Cumberland University, now part of Samford University) in 1914. He was in private practice in Tennessee from 1914 to 1918, and was then an Assistant United States Attorney for the Middle District of Tennessee from 1918 to 1921, which position he held until appointed to the solicitor's office, October 26, 1921. He was a special attorney with the Office of the General Counsel of the Bureau of Internal Revenue (now the Internal Revenue Service) in the United States Department of the Treasury from 1921 to 1924.

== Federal judicial service ==
In 1924, President Calvin Coolidge appointed Littleton to the United States Board of Tax Appeals (now the United States Tax Court) . He was one of the original twelve members appointed to the Board, and one of a group of five appointed "from the Bureau of Internal Revenue". He remained on the board from 1924 to 1929, serving as chairman from 1927 to 1929.

President Herbert Hoover reappointed Littleton as chairman of the board in October 1929. but shortly thereafter, on October 17, 1929, nominated Littleton to a seat on the Court of Claims (United States Court of Claims from June 25, 1948) vacated by Judge J. McKenzie Moss. He was confirmed by the United States Senate on November 6, 1929, and received his commission the same day. He assumed senior status on October 31, 1958. His service terminated on July 6, 1966, due to his death in Washington, D.C.

== Sources ==
- "Littleton, Benjamin Horsley - Federal Judicial Center". www.fjc.gov.

Legal offices
Preceded by Newly established tribunal	Judge of the Board of Tax Appeals; 1924–1929	Succeeded by Logan Morris
Legal offices
Preceded by J. McKenzie Moss	Judge of the United States Court of Claims; 1929–1958	Succeeded by James Randall Durfee
