= Logan Morris =

Logan Morris may refer to:

- Logan Morris (footballer) (born 2005), Australian rules footballer for Brisbane
- Logan Morris (judge) (1889–1977), American judge
