= Samuel S. Barney =

American judge and Congressman (1846-1919)

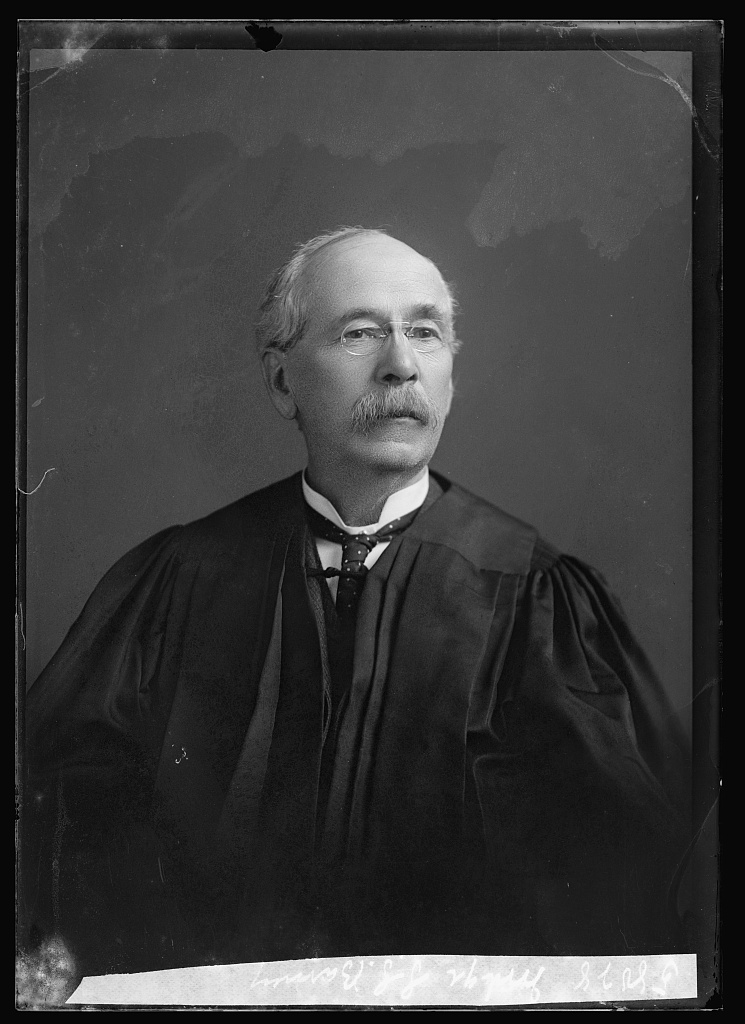

Judge of the Court of Claims
- In office December 20, 1905 – April 15, 1919
- Appointed by: Theodore Roosevelt
- Preceded by: Stanton J. Peelle
- Succeeded by: Samuel Jordan Graham

Member of the U.S. House of Representatives from Wisconsin's 5th district
- In office March 4, 1895 – March 3, 1903
- Preceded by: George H. Brickner
- Succeeded by: William H. Stafford

Personal details
- Born: Samuel Stebbins Barney; January 31, 1846 Hartford, Wisconsin Territory
- Died: December 31, 1919 (aged 73) Milwaukee, Wisconsin
- Resting place: Union Cemetery; West Bend, Wisconsin
- Party: Republican
- Education: Lombard College read law

Samuel Stebbins Barney (January 31, 1846 – December 31, 1919) was a United States representative from Wisconsin and a judge of the Court of Claims.

== Education and career ==
Born on January 31, 1846, in Hartford in the Wisconsin Territory, Barney attended the public schools, Lombard College in Galesburg, Illinois, then read law with Leander F. Frisby in West Bend, Wisconsin in 1873. He was a high school teacher in Hartford from 1869 to 1872. He was editor of the Washington County Republican from 1872 to 1873. He was admitted to the bar and entered private practice in West Bend from 1873 to 1906. He was the Superintendent of Schools for Washington County from 1876 to 1880. He was a delegate to the Republican National Convention in Chicago, Illinois in 1884.

== Congressional service ==
Barney was an unsuccessful candidate for election in 1884 to the 49th United States Congress. He was elected as a Republican from Wisconsin's 5th congressional district to the United States House of Representatives of the 54th United States Congress and to the three succeeding Congresses, serving from March 4, 1895, to March 3, 1903. He was not a candidate for renomination in 1902.

== Federal judicial service ==
Barney was nominated by President Theodore Roosevelt on December 19, 1905, to a seat on the Court of Claims (later the United States Court of Claims) vacated by Judge Stanton J. Peelle. He was confirmed by the United States Senate on December 20, 1905, and received his commission the same day. His service terminated on April 15, 1919, due to his retirement.

== Death ==
Barney died on December 31, 1919, in Milwaukee, Wisconsin. He was interred in Union Cemetery in West Bend.

== Sources ==
- United States Congress. "Samuel S. Barney (id: B000163)". Biographical Directory of the United States Congress.
- The United States Court of Claims : a history / pt. 1. The judges, 1855-1976 / by Marion T. Bennett / pt. 2. Origin, development, jurisdiction, 1855-1978 / W. Cowen, P. Nichols, M.T. Bennett. Washington, D.C. : Committee on the Bicentennial of Independence and the Constitution of the Judicial Conference of the United States, 1976 i.e. 1977-1978. 2 vols.

U.S. House of Representatives
Preceded by George H. Brickner	Member of the U.S. House of Representatives from Wisconsin's 5th congressional district 1895–1903	Succeeded by William H. Stafford
Legal offices
Preceded by Stanton J. Peelle	Judge of the Court of Claims; 1905–1919	Succeeded by Samuel Jordan Graham
