= Jack Eckerd =

American businessman (1913–2004)

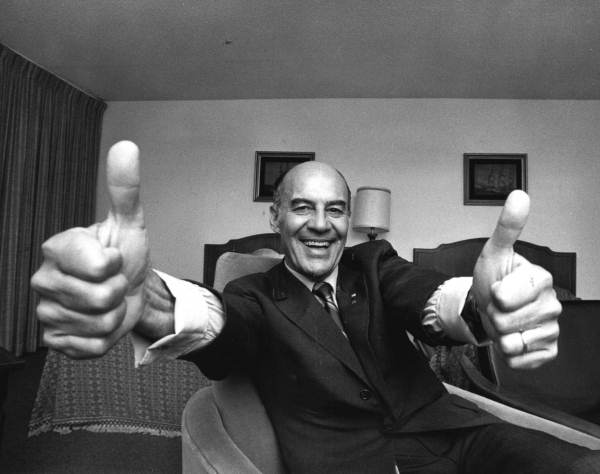
- Eckerd, c. 1970

Administrator of the General Services Administration
- In office November 21, 1975 – February 11, 1977
- President: Gerald Ford
- Preceded by: Arthur F. Sampson
- Succeeded by: Jay Solomon

Personal details
- Born: May 16, 1913 Wilmington, Delaware, U.S.
- Died: May 19, 2004 (aged 91) Clearwater, Florida, U.S.
- Party: Republican
- Spouse: Ruth Binnicker Swann (1957–2004; his death)
- Education: Culver Military Academy
- Occupation: Businessman
- Known for: Owner of Eckerd Drugs; 1978 Republican nominee for Governor of Florida

Jack Eckerd (May 16, 1913 – May 19, 2004) was an American businessman and the second generation owner of Eckerd chain of drugstores.

== Early life ==
Eckerd was born in Wilmington, Delaware, and graduated from Culver Military Academy and the Boeing School of Aeronautics. He was a pilot for the U.S. Army Air Forces during World War II, in which capacity he received three Air Medals and the Presidential Unit Citation. He was also involved in politics and served in both state and national governments for 30 years. In 1968, he developed the first residential adolescent treatment program for troubled boys, founded in Brooksville, Florida.

== Career ==
Starting in the 1950s, he transformed his family's retail drugstore business into one of the leading self-service drugstore chains in the United States, Eckerd Drugs. His personal finances were estimated in 1975 by Forbes magazine at $150 million.

The Eckerd chain, oldest of the major drugstore companies in the U.S., was founded by Jack's father, J. Milton Eckerd, in Erie, Pennsylvania, in 1898. After serving as a pilot in World War II, Jack Eckerd started a phenomenal expansion of the chain by buying three stores in Florida in 1952. The company went public as Jack Eckerd Corp. in 1961 and when Eckerd sold his shares in 1986, there were about 1,500 stores.

The chain was later sold to J.C. Penney, who built the number of stores to 2,600 before selling to rivals CVS and Jean Coutu. Stores in ten states from Florida west to Arizona became CVS; the stores from Georgia north to New York continued as Eckerd Corporation, run by Jean Coutu's US arm along with its New England–based Brooks chain.

In July 2007 Coutu's 1,549 Eckerd stores across the Mid-Atlantic and New England became part of the Rite Aid drugstore chain, finally ending more than a century of the Eckerd name in drug retailing.

== Family and death ==
Eckerd's family included seven children—two from a previous marriage, plus three adopted and two of his own after his marriage to Ruth Eckerd (1922 – July 18, 2006). He died of pneumonia in 2004, aged 91.

== Public service ==
In 1975 Eckerd was appointed administrator of the General Services Administration by U.S. President Gerald R. Ford, Jr. During his confirmation hearing, Eckerd said that President Ford instructed him (Eckerd) to "...run this agency as clean as a hound's tooth." Ford also named Eckerd to serve on the U.S.O. Board of Governors. President Ronald Reagan later named him to the Grace Commission's private sector panel on government cost control. In 1981 Governor Bob Graham named Eckerd chairman of Florida's Prison Rehabilitative Industries & Diversified Enterprises, Inc. (PRIDE), a unique private sector board that operates all Florida Prison industries.

== Political campaigns ==
In 1970, Eckerd entered the Republican gubernatorial primary to challenge incumbent Governor Claude R. Kirk, Jr. A third candidate, State Senator L. A. "Skip" Bafalis of Palm Beach, later a U.S. representative, also entered the primary. Eckerd warned that the renomination of Kirk would produce a Republican fiasco in the fall campaign. In a primary endorsement, the Miami Herald depicted Eckerd as "an efficient campaigner with the ability to bring people together constructively. ... [Eckerd has] a common touch, dedication to high principle, and organizing genius."

William C. Cramer, the Republican nominee for the U.S. Senate in 1970, was also at odds with Kirk but was attempting to preserve party unity at the same time. Though he voted in the primary for Eckerd, Cramer took no public position. Kirk received 172,888 primary ballots, but Bafalis's 48,378 votes were sufficient to require a runoff with Eckerd, who received 137,731. Kirk then prevailed in the runoff, 199,943 to Eckerd's 152,327, after he obtained Bafalis's reluctant endorsement.

Distraught that Kirk's antics had led to a fratricidal primary, Cramer said that he "customarily" avoided involvement in primaries outside of his own race. Kirk claimed that Cramer assisted Eckerd, whom Kirk assailed as "notorious for his ability to change the scope of the truth. He has an ego problem." In the campaign rhetoric, Kirk denounced Eckerd for having previously contributed to Democratic candidates, for allegedly running down a Cuban fisherman in a yacht race, and for spending lavishly from his personal fortune in the 1970 primary campaign. Though he defeated Eckerd, Kirk was then unseated, 57-43 percent, by the Democrat Reubin Askew, a state senator from Pensacola.

Eckerd said that though he had supported Kirk in 1966, he became disappointed and embarrassed with the governor: "I was offended by his public behavior and chagrined that he was a Republican." Despite Kirk's tactics, Eckerd said "time heals all wounds, and now I chuckle about it." He added that his primary runoff defeat in 1970 probably prolonged his life."

In 1974, Eckerd was the unsuccessful Republican nominee for the U.S. Senate against the Democrat Richard Stone. The conservative vote was divided that year with Dr. John Grady, nominee of George C. Wallace's former American Independent Party siphoning votes from Eckerd. Grady ran again in 1976 as the Republican nominee but lost to the Democratic incumbent Lawton Chiles of Lakeland, who had defeated Cramer in 1970.

In 1978, Eckerd defeated U.S. Representative Louis Frey, Jr., of Winter Park to win the Republican gubernatorial nomination, but he lost in the fall to the Democrat Bob Graham of Miami, later a U.S. senator. Kirk ran unsuccessfully for governor again that year, too, but as a Democrat after he failed to qualify as an Independent.

== Philanthropy ==
With the millions he made, Eckerd became a philanthropist.

- Ruth Eckerd Hall, a 2,100-seat regional performing arts venue for concerts, plays and civic events in Clearwater, Florida, was named for his wife Ruth Eckerd. It was designed by the Arizona-based Frank Lloyd Wright Foundation and opened in 1983.
- Florida Presbyterian College in St. Petersburg, Florida, changed its name to Eckerd College in 1972 following a $12.5 million contribution from Jack, who also served for a time as its interim president.
- In 1968, Jack and Ruth Eckerd founded Eckerd Youth Alternatives (known simply as "Eckerd Kids"), a private, not-for-profit organization dedicated to strengthening children, families and communities, using an Outdoor Therapeutic Program model that included opening the first OTP in the state of Florida for boys in 1968 and the first OTP for girls in the southeastern United States. The organization's success with outdoor therapeutic programming soon expanded beyond Florida to several states. Today, Eckerd serves more than 18,500 children and families annually through a continuum of over 30 behavioral health and child welfare services, ranging from early intervention & prevention to community-based interventions, out-of-home care, and workforce development. Affiliate Programs include Paxen Learning and CARING for Children.
- National Foundation for Youth, a philanthropic organization underwritten by Jack and Ruth Eckerd in 1994 to support programs benefiting troubled young people, was later merged into the work of Eckerd.

== Writing ==
In 1987, Jack wrote his autobiography with Paul Conn, Eckerd: Finding the Right Prescription. This was followed in 1990 by Enough is Enough, a booklet offering solutions to the nation's severe prison overcrowding crisis. In 1991 he co-authored Why America Doesn't Work with Charles Colson, analyzing the decline of the work ethic in America and offering solutions.

== Awards and honors ==
- Air Medal
- Presidential Unit Citation
- Floridian of the Year by the Orlando Sentinel
- Child Advocate of the Year
- Florida Enterprise Medal
- Mr. Clearwater by the Greater Chamber of Commerce
- LeRoy Collins Lifetime Achievement Award by Leadership Florida
- Golden Plate Award of the American Academy of Achievement, 1974

Party political offices
Preceded by Edward Gurney	Republican nominee for U.S. Senator from Florida (Class 3); 1974	Succeeded by Paula Hawkins
Preceded by Jerry Thomas	Republican nominee for Governor of Florida; 1978	Succeeded by Skip Bafalis
Government offices
Preceded by Arthur F. Sampson	Administrator of the General Services Administration; 1975–1977	Succeeded by Jay Solomon
