= James Randall Durfee =

American judge (1897–1977)

Senior Judge of the United States Court of Claims
- In office January 6, 1972 – October 29, 1977

Judge of the United States Court of Claims
- In office April 22, 1960 – January 6, 1972
- Appointed by: Dwight D. Eisenhower
- Preceded by: Benjamin Horsley Littleton
- Succeeded by: Shiro Kashiwa

Personal details
- Born: James Randall Durfee; November 3, 1897 Oshkosh, Wisconsin, U.S.
- Died: October 29, 1977 (aged 79) Bethesda, Maryland, U.S.
- Education: Marquette University (LLB)

James Randall Durfee (November 3, 1897 – October 29, 1977) was an American judge who was Chairman of the Civil Aeronautics Board and a judge of the United States Court of Claims.

== Education and career ==
Born on November 3, 1897, in Oshkosh, Wisconsin, Durfee received a Bachelor of Laws in 1926 from Marquette University Law School. He served in the United States Army during World War I from 1917 to 1919. He entered private practice in Antigo, Wisconsin from 1926 to 1951. He was district attorney for Langlade County, Wisconsin from 1928 to 1932. He was a Commissioner for the Wisconsin Circuit Court for the Tenth Judicial Circuit from 1934 to 1950. He was a member of the Public Service Commission of Wisconsin from 1951 to 1956, serving as chairman from 1953 to 1956. He was chairman of the Civil Aeronautics Board from 1956 to 1960.

== Federal judicial service ==
Durfee was nominated by President Dwight D. Eisenhower on January 11, 1960, to a seat on the United States Court of Claims vacated by Judge Benjamin Horsley Littleton. He was confirmed by the United States Senate on April 20, 1960, and received his commission on April 22, 1960. He assumed senior status on January 6, 1972. His service terminated on October 29, 1977, due to his death in Bethesda, Maryland.

== Sources ==
- "Durfee, James Randall - Federal Judicial Center". www.fjc.gov.

Legal offices
Preceded by Benjamin Horsley Littleton	Judge of the United States Court of Claims; 1960–1972	Succeeded by Shiro Kashiwa
