= Francis Marion Wright =

American judge

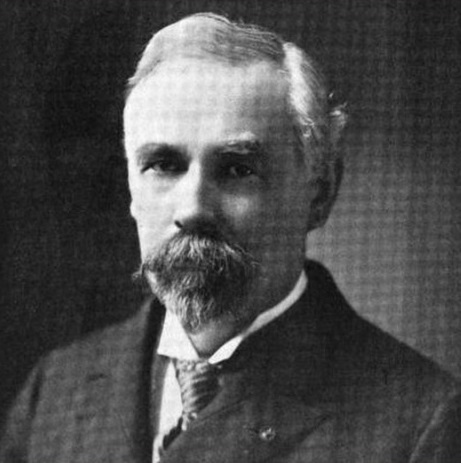
- From 1900's History of Illinois Republicanism

Judge of the United States District Court for the Eastern District of Illinois
- In office March 17, 1905 – July 15, 1917
- Appointed by: Theodore Roosevelt
- Preceded by: Seat established by 33 Stat. 992
- Succeeded by: George W. English

Judge of the United States Court of Claims
- In office January 13, 1903 – March 16, 1905
- Appointed by: Theodore Roosevelt
- Preceded by: John Davis
- Succeeded by: Fenton Whitlock Booth

Personal details
- Born: Francis Marion Wright; August 5, 1844 Adams County, Ohio, U.S.
- Died: July 15, 1917 (aged 72) Urbana, Illinois, U.S.
- Resting place: Mount Hope Cemetery and Mausoleum, Urbana, Illinois
- Party: Republican
- Spouse: Elizabeth West (m. 1868)
- Children: 5
- Education: University of Cincinnati College of Law (LL.B.)
- Profession: Attorney; Judge

Military service
- Allegiance: United States Union
- Branch/service: Union Army
- Years of service: 1861–1865
- Rank: Second Lieutenant
- Unit: 39th Ohio Infantry
- Battles/wars: American Civil War: Western Theater of the American Civil War; Atlanta campaign

Francis Marion Wright (August 5, 1844 – July 15, 1917) was a United States district judge of the United States District Court for the Eastern District of Illinois and previously was a judge of the Court of Claims.

== Early life ==
Born in Adams County, Ohio, Wright was the son of James and Elizabeth (Copple) Wright. He was educated in Bentonville, Ohio and at the Ohio Valley Academy in Decatur, Ohio, and his parents hoped he would study medicine and become a doctor.

== Military service ==
In 1861, Wright enlisted in the Union Army for the American Civil War, becoming a private in Company I, 39th Ohio Infantry. He advanced through the ranks of corporal, sergeant, and sergeant major before receiving his commission as a second lieutenant, and served in several battles in the Western Theater of the American Civil War, including the Atlanta campaign. Wright participated in more than 40 engagements, and was wounded at the Battle of Atlanta. He was discharged at the end of the war in 1865. After the war, Wright took part in the activities of several veterans' organizations, including the Military Order of the Loyal Legion of the United States and the Grand Army of the Republic.

== Post-Civil War ==
Following his discharge from the army, Wright determined to pursue a legal career rather than a medical one, and began to study law in the office of Dewitt Clinton Loudon, a Georgetown, Ohio attorney and fellow Union Army veteran. He then attended the Cincinnati Law School (now the University of Cincinnati College of Law), from which he received his LL.B. degree in 1867. He was admitted to the bar in 1867, and practiced in Georgetown until 1868, when he moved to Urbana, Illinois. Wright continued to practice law in Urbana, and also became involved in several local businesses, including the First National Bank of Urbana. Wright was one of the bank's original incorporators, and served for many years as its vice president and president.

A Republican, in 1891, Wright was elected judge of Illinois' Fourth Judicial Circuit. After a court reorganization, in 1897 Wright was reelected to the bench, this time as judge of the Sixth Circuit. After his 1897 reelection, the Illinois Supreme Court appointed Wright as a judge of the Illinois Court of Appeals, first from the Second Appellate District, and later from the Third. He served on the appeals court from 1897 until resigning in 1903 to become a federal judge.

== Federal judicial service ==
Wright was nominated by President Theodore Roosevelt on December 2, 1902, to the seat on the Court of Claims (later the United States Court of Claims) vacated by Judge John Davis. He was confirmed by the United States Senate on January 13, 1903, and received his commission the same day. His service terminated on March 16, 1905, due to his appointment to the Eastern District of Illinois.

On March 14, 1905 Wright was nominated by President Roosevelt as a judge of the United States District Court for the Eastern District of Illinois, filling a new seat authorized by 33 Stat. 992. He was confirmed by the Senate on March 17, 1905, and received his commission the same day. His service terminated on July 15, 1917, due to his death in Urbana. He was buried at Mount Hope Cemetery and Mausoleum in Urbana.

== Family ==
In 1868, Wright married Elizabeth West. They were the parents of five children, three of whom - Royal, Edith, and Lora - lived to adulthood.

Legal offices
Preceded by John Davis	Judge of the Court of Claims; 1903–1905	Succeeded by Fenton Whitlock Booth
Preceded by Seat established by 33 Stat. 992	Judge of the United States District Court for the Eastern District of Illinois; 1905–1917	Succeeded by George W. English
