= Robert Lowe Kunzig =

American judge (1918–1982)

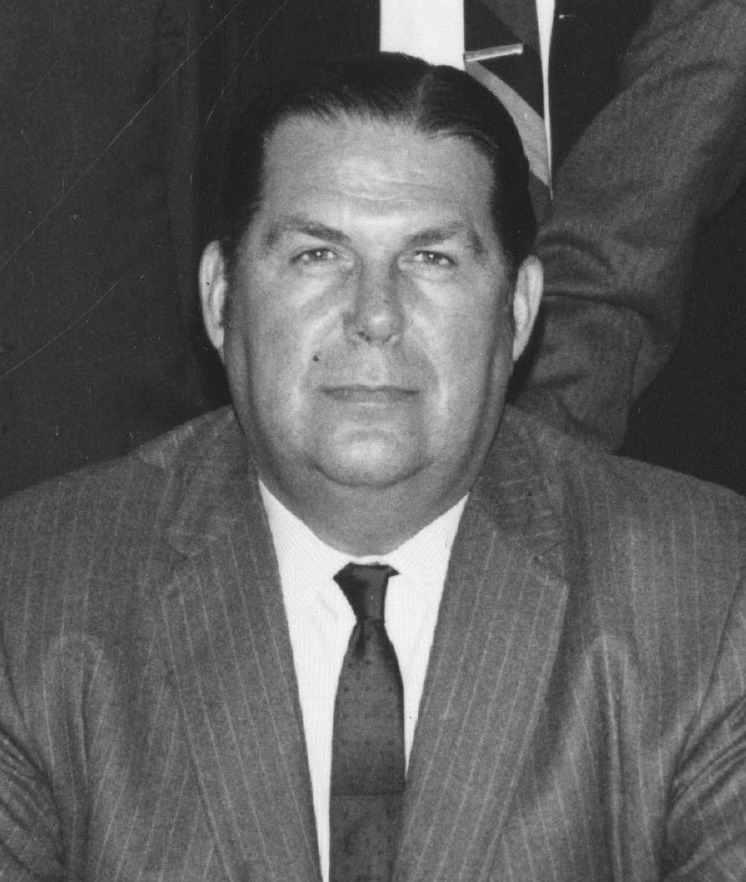
- Kunzig in 1969

Judge of the United States Court of Claims
- In office January 3, 1972 – February 21, 1982
- Appointed by: Richard Nixon
- Preceded by: Don Nelson Laramore
- Succeeded by: Jean Galloway Bissell

Administrator of the General Services Administration
- In office March 17, 1969 – January 14, 1972
- President: Richard Nixon
- Preceded by: Lawson B. Knott Jr.
- Succeeded by: Arthur F. Sampson

Personal details
- Born: October 31, 1918 Philadelphia, Pennsylvania, U.S.
- Died: February 21, 1982 (aged 63) Washington, D.C., U.S.
- Resting place: West Laurel Hill Cemetery, Bala Cynwyd, Pennsylvania, U.S.
- Spouse: Pamela Wilson Chappell
- Children: 2
- Parents: Robert Kunzig (father); Hilda Elsa (Lowe) Kunzig (mother)
- Education: University of Pennsylvania (AB, JD)

Robert Lowe Kunzig (October 31, 1918 – February 21, 1982) was an American attorney and judge. He served as a prosecutor during the Nuremberg Military Tribunals from 1946 to 1947 and successfully prosecuted Ilse Koch. He was counsel for the House Un-American Activities Committee from 1953 to 1955, executive director of the Civil Aeronautics Board from 1955 to 1958, a member of the Foreign Claims Settlement Commission from 1958 to 1961, and administrator of the General Services Administration from 1969 to 1972. He was nominated by President Richard Nixon as a judge on the United States Court of Claims and served from 1972 to 1982.

== Early life and education ==
He was born October 31, 1918, in Philadelphia, Pennsylvania, to Robert and Hilda Elsa (Lowe) Kunzig. His family was of German descent and he was fluent in German language. He graduated as valedictorian of his class at Frankford High School in 1935. He received an Artium Baccalaureus degree from the University of Pennsylvania in 1939, and a Juris Doctor from the University of Pennsylvania Law School in 1942. During college, he had a jazz band which performed on major ocean liners traveling between Europe and the United States. He was admitted to the Pennsylvania bar in 1942 and the Minnesota bar in 1961.

== Career ==
Kunzig served as a captain in the United States Army during World War II from 1942 to 1946. He served in a top secret War Department program to democratize Germany. He received the Army Commendation Medal with Oak leaf cluster for his service. He was a prosecutor during the Nuremberg Military Tribunals from 1946 to 1947 and successfully prosecuted Ilse Koch.

He was in private practice in Philadelphia from 1948 to 1969. He was deputy attorney general for the State of Pennsylvania from 1948 to 1953. He was chairman of the Philadelphia Young Republicans Club from 1948 to 1950 and the Pennsylvania Young Republicans Club from 1951 to 1953. He was counsel for the House Un-American Activities Committee of the United States House of Representatives from 1953 to 1955. Kunzig was legal adviser to the Chairman and Executive Director of the Civil Aeronautics Board in Washington, D.C. from 1955 to 1958. He was a member of the Foreign Claims Settlement Commission in Washington, D.C. from 1958 to 1961.

He moved to Minneapolis, Minnesota, and worked as a vice-president for a construction and lumber company. He ran unsuccessfully as the Republican nominee for State attorney general in Minnesota.

He was an administrative assistant for United States Senator Hugh Scott from 1963 to 1966. He was executive director of the General State Authority for the State of Pennsylvania from 1967 to 1968. He was Administrator of the General Services Administration from 1969 to 1972.

Kunzig managed the United States Senate campaign of United States Senator Hugh Scott in 1964, the campaign of Arlen Specter for District Attorney of Philadelphia in 1965 and the campaign of Raymond P. Shafer for Governor of Pennsylvania in 1966.

He was nominated by President Richard Nixon on November 18, 1971, to a seat on the United States Court of Claims vacated by Judge Don Nelson Laramore. He was confirmed by the United States Senate on December 2, 1971, and received his commission on January 3, 1972.

He was a member of the Union League of Philadelphia and the Metropolitan Club in Washington, D.C., and the president of the Mask and Wig Club.

He died February 21, 1982, in Washington, D.C., and was interred at West Laurel Hill Cemetery in Bala Cynwyd, Pennsylvania.

== Personal life ==
He married Pamela Wilson Chappell on December 6, 1951, and together they had two children. They were divorced in 1966.

Party political offices
Preceded by Gaylord A. Saetre	Republican nominee for Attorney General of Minnesota; 1962	Succeeded by Douglas M. Head
Government offices
Preceded by Lawson B. Knott Jr.	Administrator of the General Services Administration; 1969–1972	Succeeded by Arthur F. Sampson
Legal offices
Preceded by Don Nelson Laramore	Judge of the United States Court of Claims; 1972–1982	Succeeded by Jean Galloway Bissell
