= Samuel Estill Whitaker =

American judge (1886–1967)

Senior Judge of the United States Court of Claims
- In office July 19, 1964 – March 26, 1967

Judge of the United States Court of Claims
- In office July 13, 1939 – July 19, 1964
- Appointed by: Franklin D. Roosevelt
- Preceded by: Richard S. Whaley
- Succeeded by: Linton McGee Collins

Personal details
- Born: Samuel Estill Whitaker; September 25, 1886 Winchester, Tennessee
- Died: March 26, 1967 (aged 80) Washington, D.C.
- Education: University of Chattanooga (LL.B.)

Samuel Estill Whitaker (September 25, 1886 – March 26, 1967) was a Tennessee attorney and later a judge of the United States Court of Claims.

== Education and career ==
Born on September 25, 1886, in Winchester, Tennessee, Whitaker received a Bachelor of Laws from the University of Chattanooga (now the University of Tennessee at Chattanooga) in 1909. He was in private practice in Chattanooga, Tennessee from 1909 to 1914, when he joined the United States Army at the outset of World War I. He served as a captain in Field Artillery until 1919. He was an attorney for the Bureau of Internal Revenue (now the Internal Revenue Service) from 1919 to 1920. He returned to private practice in Chattanooga from 1921 to 1937. He was city attorney of Chattanooga from 1923 to 1924. He was the Mayor of Riverview, (Note: Now part of Chattanooga.) Tennessee from 1925 to 1929. He was a special assistant to the Attorney General of the United States in the United States Department of Justice from 1933 to 1937. He was an assistant attorney general for the Civil Division of the United States Department of Justice in 1939.

== Federal judicial service ==
Whitaker was nominated by President Franklin D. Roosevelt on June 23, 1939, to a Judge seat on the Court of Claims (United States Court of Claims from June 25, 1948) vacated by Judge Richard S. Whaley. He was confirmed by the United States Senate on July 11, 1939, and his received commission on July 13, 1939. Whitaker was initially appointed as a Judge under Article I, but the court was raised to Article III status by operation of law on July 28, 1953, and Whitaker thereafter served as an Article III Judge. He assumed senior status on July 19, 1964. His service terminated on March 26, 1967, due to his death in Washington, D.C.

== Sources ==
- "Whitaker, Samuel Estill - Federal Judicial Center". www.fjc.gov.

Legal offices
| Preceded by Richard S. Whaley | Judge of the United States Court of Claims; 1939–1964 | Succeeded by Linton McGee Collins |
