= Lawson B. Knott Jr. =

American administrator

6th Administrator of the General Services Administration
- In office December 1, 1964 – February 28, 1969
- President: Lyndon B. Johnson; Richard Nixon
- Preceded by: Bernard L. Boutin
- Succeeded by: Robert Lowe Kunzig

Personal details
- Born: April 6, 1912 Wendell, North Carolina, U.S.
- Died: May 23, 1998 (aged 86) Arlington County, Virginia, U.S.
- Party: Democratic

Lawson B. Knott Jr. (April 6, 1912 – May 23, 1998) was an American administrator who served as Administrator of the General Services Administration from 1964 to 1969.

He died of respiratory failure on May 23, 1998, in Arlington County, Virginia at age 86.
