= Edward Kernan Campbell =

American judge (1858–1938)

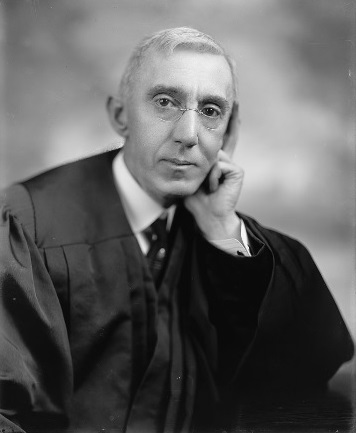
- Harris & Ewing photo, circa 1920.

Senior Judge of the Court of Claims
- In office April 22, 1928 – December 7, 1938

Chief Justice of the Court of Claims
- In office May 22, 1913 – April 22, 1928
- Appointed by: Woodrow Wilson
- Preceded by: Stanton J. Peelle
- Succeeded by: Fenton Whitlock Booth

Personal details
- Born: Edward Kernan Campbell; April 17, 1858 Abingdon, Virginia, U.S.
- Died: December 7, 1938 (aged 80) Washington, D.C., U.S.
- Education: University of Virginia; Emory and Henry College

Edward Kernan Campbell (April 17, 1858 – December 7, 1938) was chief judge of the Court of Claims.

== Education and career ==
Born on April 17, 1858, in Abingdon, Virginia, Campbell attended the University of Virginia and Emory and Henry College. He entered private practice in Abingdon from 1883 to 1884. He continued private practice in Birmingham, Alabama from 1884 to 1913.

== Federal judicial service ==
Campbell was nominated by President Woodrow Wilson on May 1, 1913, to the Chief Justice seat on the Court of Claims (later the United States Court of Claims) vacated by Chief Justice Stanton J. Peelle. He was confirmed by the United States Senate on May 22, 1913, and received his commission the same day. He assumed senior status on April 22, 1928. His service terminated on December 7, 1938, due to his death in Washington, D.C.

=== Other service ===
Campbell served as a special master for the United States District Court for the Southern District of New York in 1931.

== Sources ==
- "Campbell, Edward Kernan - Federal Judicial Center". www.fjc.gov.

Legal offices
Preceded by Stanton J. Peelle	Chief Justice of the Court of Claims; 1913–1928	Succeeded by Fenton Whitlock Booth
