= George Parker Scarburgh =

American judge (1807–1879)

Judge of the Court of Claims
- In office May 8, 1855 – April 20, 1861
- Appointed by: Franklin Pierce
- Preceded by: Seat established by 10 Stat. 612
- Succeeded by: Joseph Casey

Personal details
- Born: George Parker Scarburgh; February 11, 1807 Accomack County, Virginia, U.S.
- Died: December 21, 1879 (aged 72) Norfolk, Virginia, U.S.
- Education: read law

George Parker Scarburgh (February 11, 1807 – December 21, 1879) was a judge of the Court of Claims.

== Education and career ==
Born on February 11, 1807, in Accomack County, Virginia, Scarburgh read law with Thomas R. Joynes in 1827. He entered private practice in Accomack County from 1828 to 1844. He was a judge of the Virginia Circuit Superior Court of Law and Chancery for the Third Judicial Circuit from 1844 to 1852. He was a professor of law at the College of William & Mary from 1852 to 1855.

== Federal judicial service ==
Scarburgh received a recess appointment from President Franklin Pierce on May 8, 1855, to the Court of Claims (later the United States Court of Claims), to a new seat authorized by 10 Stat. 612. He was nominated to the same position by President Pierce on January 22, 1856. He was confirmed by the United States Senate on February 11, 1856, and received his commission the same day. His service terminated on April 20, 1861, due to his resignation.

== Later career and death ==
Scarburgh served as a commissioner for the Confederate Court of Claims from 1861 to 1862. He resumed private practice in Halifax County, Virginia, from 1863 to 1865, and in Norfolk, Virginia, from 1865 to 1877. He was a judge of the Norfolk Corporation Court from 1877 to 1879. He died on December 21, 1879, in Norfolk.

== Sources ==
- "Scarburgh, George Parker - Federal Judicial Center". www.fjc.gov.

Legal offices
| Preceded by Seat established by 10 Stat. 612 | Judge of the Court of Claims; 1855–1861 | Succeeded by Joseph Casey |
