= George Evan Howell =

American politician and jurist

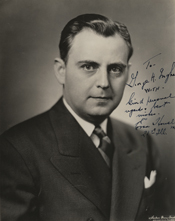

Judge of the United States Court of Claims
- In office July 30, 1947 – September 30, 1953
- Appointed by: Harry S. Truman
- Preceded by: John Marvin Jones
- Succeeded by: Don Nelson Laramore

Member of the U.S. House of Representatives from Illinois's 21st district
- In office January 3, 1941 – October 5, 1947
- Preceded by: Frank W. Fries
- Succeeded by: Peter F. Mack Jr.

Personal details
- Born: George Evan Howell; September 21, 1905 Marion, Illinois, U.S.
- Died: January 18, 1980 (aged 74) Clearwater, Florida, U.S.
- Resting place: Arlington National Cemetery; Arlington County, Virginia
- Party: Republican
- Education: University of Illinois, Urbana-Champaign (B.S.); University of Illinois College of Law (LL.B.)

George Evan Howell (September 21, 1905 – January 18, 1980) was a United States representative from Illinois and judge of the United States Court of Claims.

== Education and career ==
Born in Marion, Illinois, Howell attended the public schools at Villa Grove, Illinois. He graduated with a Bachelor of Science degree from the University of Illinois College of Commerce and Business Administration at the University of Illinois at Urbana–Champaign in 1927, where he was a member of Tau Kappa Epsilon fraternity, and from the University of Illinois College of Law with a Bachelor of Laws in 1930. He taught school at Harvard High School in McHenry County, Illinois, in 1927 and 1928. He served as member of the faculty of the College of Commerce at the University of Illinois at Urbana–Champaign from 1928 to 1930 while working his way through law school. He was admitted to the bar in 1930 and commenced practice in Springfield, Illinois. He became a member of the Officers Reserve Corps in 1933. He served as a Referee in Bankruptcy for the United States District Court for the Southern District of Illinois from 1937 to 1941.

== Congressional service ==
Howell was elected as a Republican to the 77th United States Congress and to the three succeeding Congresses and served from January 3, 1941, until his resignation on October 6, 1947.

== Federal judicial service ==
Howell was nominated by President Harry S. Truman on July 18, 1947, to a seat on the United States Court of Claims vacated by Judge John Marvin Jones. He was confirmed by the United States Senate on July 23, 1947, and received his commission on July 30, 1947. Howell was initially appointed as a Judge under Article I, but the court was raised to Article III status by operation of law on July 28, 1953, and Howell thereafter served as an Article III Judge. His service terminated on September 30, 1953, due to his resignation.

== Post judicial service and death ==
Following his resignation from the federal bench, Howell served as Chairman of the Illinois State Toll Highway Commission from 1953 to 1955. After this he resumed the private practice of law in Washington, D.C. until 1975. After his retirement, he resided in Largo, Florida, until his death in Clearwater, Florida on January 18, 1980, whereupon he was cremated and his remains were entombed in a niche in the Columbarium at the Arlington National Cemetery in Arlington County, Virginia.

== Sources ==
- United States Congress. "George Evan Howell (id: H000863)". Biographical Directory of the United States Congress.

U.S. House of Representatives
Preceded by Frank W. Fries	Member of the U.S. House of Representatives from Illinois's 21st congressional district 1941–1947	Succeeded by Peter F. Mack Jr.
Legal offices
Preceded by John Marvin Jones	Judge of the United States Court of Claims; 1947–1953	Succeeded by Don Nelson Laramore
