= Linton McGee Collins =

American judge (1902–1972)

Judge of the United States Court of Claims
- In office September 18, 1964 – April 12, 1972
- Appointed by: Lyndon B. Johnson
- Preceded by: Samuel Estill Whitaker
- Succeeded by: Marion T. Bennett

Personal details
- Born: Linton McGee Collins; June 21, 1902 Reidsville, Georgia
- Died: April 12, 1972 (aged 69) Washington, D.C.
- Education: Mercer University (A.B., M.A.)

Linton McGee Collins (June 21, 1902 – April 12, 1972) was a judge of the United States Court of Claims.

== Education and career ==
Born on June 21, 1902, in Reidsville, Georgia, Collins received an Artium Baccalaureus degree in 1921 from Mercer University and a Master of Arts in 1922 from the same institution. He was a teacher at Lanier High School (now Central High School) in Macon, Georgia from 1922 to 1924, and a teacher at Columbia High School in Columbia, South Carolina from 1924 to 1925. He entered private practice in Tampa, Florida from 1925 to 1926 and practiced in Miami, Florida from 1926 to 1933.

He was a professor at the University of Miami from 1930 to 1932. He was the Personnel Director and Division Administrator of the National Recovery Administration from 1933 to 1935. He served with the United States Department of Justice from 1935 to 1944, serving as first assistant to the Deputy Attorney General in 1935, and as special assistant to the Attorney General of the United States from 1935 to 1944. He returned to private practice in Washington, D.C. from 1944 to 1964.

== Federal judicial service ==
Collins was nominated by President Lyndon B. Johnson on September 8, 1964, to a seat on the United States Court of Claims vacated by Judge Samuel Estill Whitaker. He was confirmed by the United States Senate on September 17, 1964, and received his commission on September 18, 1964. His service terminated on April 12, 1972, due to his death in Washington, D.C.

== Sources ==
- Federal Judicial Center entry on Linton McGee Collins

Legal offices
Preceded by Samuel Estill Whitaker	Judge of the United States Court of Claims; 1964–1972	Succeeded by Marion T. Bennett
