= Fenton Whitlock Booth =

American politician (1869–1947)

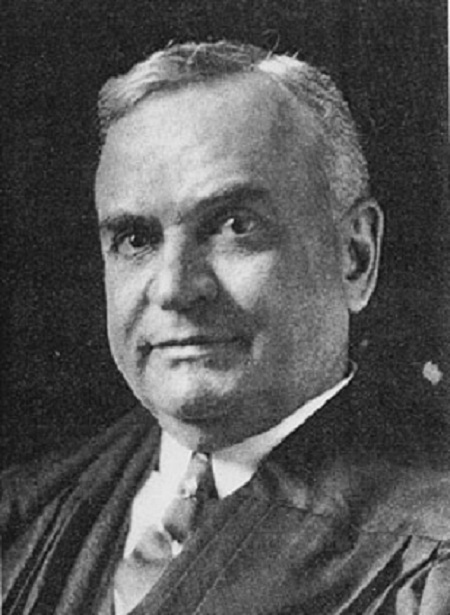

Senior Judge of the Court of Claims
- In office June 15, 1939 – July 26, 1947

Chief Justice of the Court of Claims
- In office April 18, 1928 – June 15, 1939
- Appointed by: Calvin Coolidge
- Preceded by: Edward Kernan Campbell
- Succeeded by: Richard S. Whaley

Judge of the Court of Claims
- In office March 17, 1905 – April 23, 1928
- Appointed by: Theodore Roosevelt
- Preceded by: Francis Marion Wright
- Succeeded by: Nicholas J. Sinnott

Personal details
- Born: Fenton Whitlock Booth; May 12, 1869 Marshall, Illinois, U.S.
- Died: July 26, 1947 (aged 78) Indianapolis, Indiana, U.S.
- Relatives: Newton Booth
- Education: DePauw University; University of Michigan Law School (LL.B.)

Fenton Whitlock Booth (May 12, 1869 – July 26, 1947) was a member of the Illinois House of Representatives and later chief justice of the Court of Claims.

== Education and career ==
Born on May 12, 1869, in Marshall, Clark County, Illinois, Booth attended DePauw University, where he was a member of Delta Upsilon, and received a Bachelor of Laws in 1892 from the University of Michigan Law School. He entered private practice in Marshall from 1892 to 1905. He was a member of the Illinois House of Representatives from 1896 to 1898. He was a delegate to the 1904 Republican National Convention. He was dean of Howard University Law School from 1922 to 1930. He was a professor at the National University Law School (now George Washington University Law School) from 1931 to 1938. He was a professor at Southeastern University in Washington, D.C. He refused to accept remuneration for any of his academic service. He was Chairman of Board #10 of the Office of Price Administration in Indianapolis, Indiana.

== Federal judicial service ==
Booth was nominated by President Theodore Roosevelt on March 14, 1905, to a seat on the Court of Claims (later the United States Court of Claims) vacated by Judge Francis Marion Wright. He was confirmed by the United States Senate on March 17, 1905, and received his commission the same day. His service terminated on April 23, 1928, due to his elevation to be Chief Justice of the same court.

Booth was nominated by President Calvin Coolidge on April 18, 1928, to the Chief Justice seat on the Court of Claims vacated by Chief Justice Edward Kernan Campbell. He was confirmed by the Senate on April 18, 1928, and received his commission the same day. He assumed senior status on June 15, 1939. His service terminated on July 26, 1947, due to his death in Indianapolis.

== Personal ==
Booth was the nephew of California political figure Newton Booth. He was married to Anna Harlan on May 17, 1893. Anna Harlan Booth died on 20 March 1895 (age 24). They had a daughter, Margaret, born March 29, 1894. He married Mabel Dana on December 17, 1896 They had 3 daughters, Virginia - born Oct. 4 1898, Marian - April 9, 1900, Louise - 1901.

== Sources ==
- "Booth, Fenton Whitlock - Federal Judicial Center". www.fjc.gov.

Legal offices
| Preceded by Francis Marion Wright | Judge of the Court of Claims; 1905–1928 | Succeeded by Nicholas J. Sinnott |
| Preceded by Edward Kernan Campbell | Chief Justice of the Court of Claims; 1928–1939 | Succeeded by Richard S. Whaley |
