= Arthur F. Sampson =

American administrator

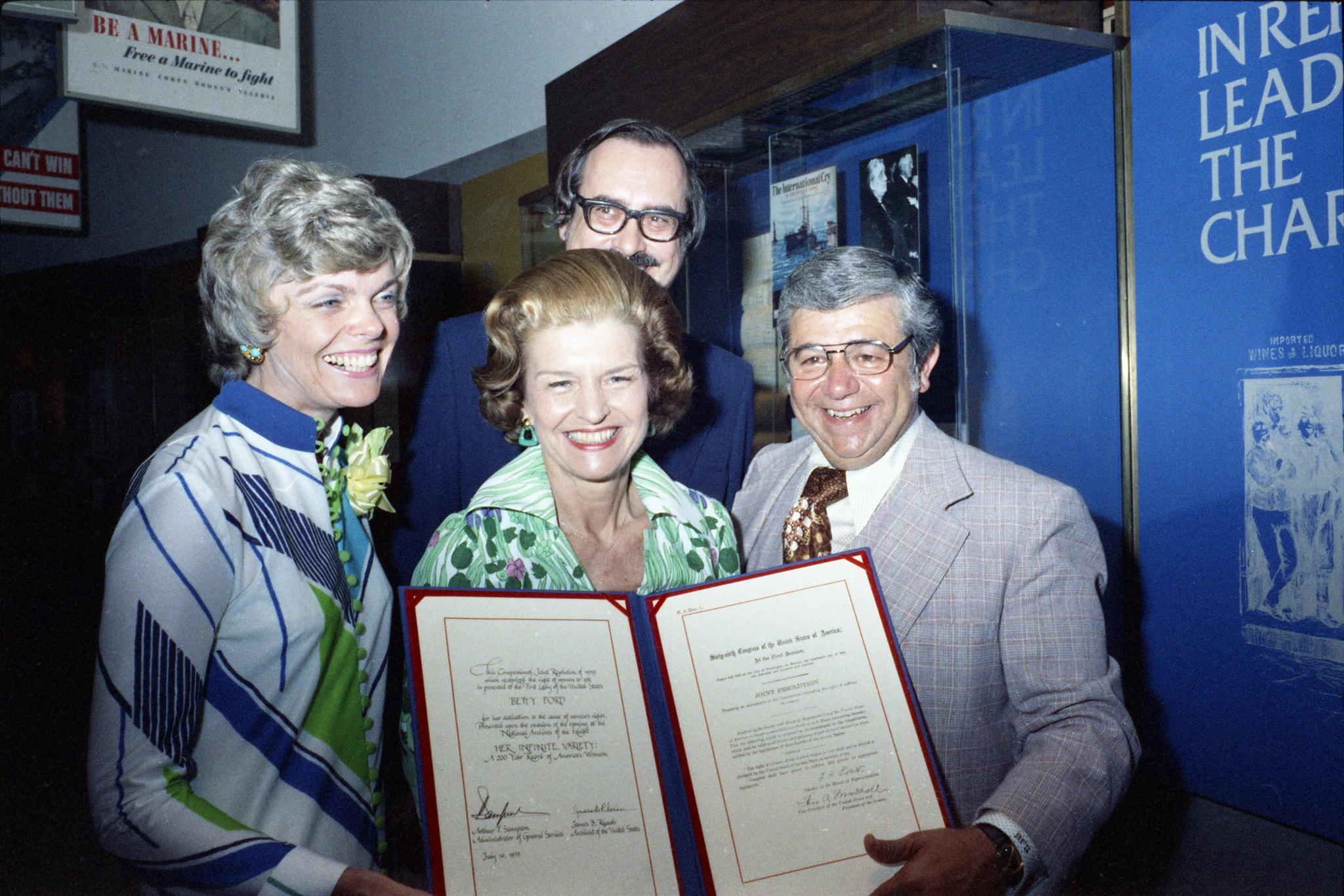
- Arthur F. Sampson with first lady Betty Ford, Jill Ruckelshaus and James B. Rhoads

8th Administrator of the General Services Administration
- In office June 2, 1972 – October 15, 1975
- President: Richard Nixon; Gerald Ford
- Preceded by: Robert Lowe Kunzig
- Succeeded by: Jack Eckerd

Personal details
- Born: October 8, 1926; Warren, Rhode Island
- Died: March 13, 1988 (aged 61); Rockville, Maryland
- Political party: Republican

Arthur F. Sampson (October 8, 1926 – March 13, 1988) was an American administrator who served as Administrator of the General Services Administration from 1972 to 1975.

He died of cardiac arrest on March 13, 1988, in Rockville, Maryland at age 61.
