= List of federal judges appointed by Theodore Roosevelt =

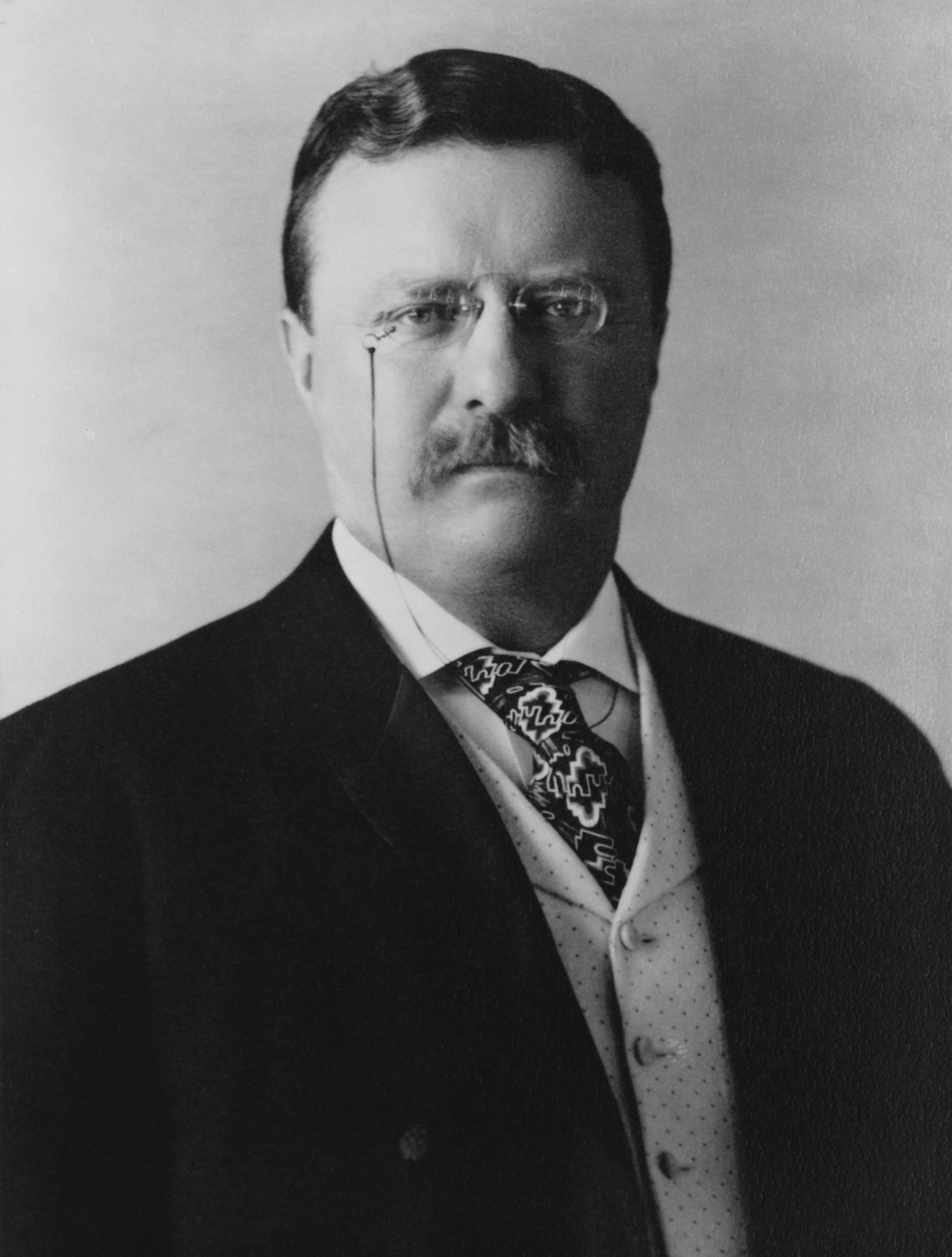
President Theodore Roosevelt.

Following is a list of all Article III United States federal judges appointed by President Theodore Roosevelt during his presidency. In total Roosevelt appointed 80 Article III federal judges, a record for his day surpassing the 46 appointed by Ulysses S. Grant. These included 3 Justices to the Supreme Court of the United States, 19 judges to the United States Courts of Appeals, and 58 judges to the United States district courts.

Five of Roosevelt's appointees - George Bethune Adams, Thomas H. Anderson, and Robert W. Archbald, Andrew McConnell January Cochran, and Benjamin Franklin Keller, were originally placed on their respective courts as recess appointments by President William McKinley. Following the assassination which resulted in McKinley's death on September 14, 1901, Roosevelt chose to formally nominate those judges for confirmation by the United States Senate, and all were confirmed.

Additionally, 9 Article I appointments are listed, including 5 judges to the United States Court of Claims and 4 members to the Board of General Appraisers (later the United States Customs Court).

From the establishment of the United States courts of appeals on June 16, 1891, until the abolition of the United States circuit courts on December 31, 1911, all United States Circuit Judges where jointly appointed to both the United States court of appeal and the United States circuit court for their respective circuit. Starting January 1, 1912, United States Circuit Judges served only on the United States court of appeal for their respective circuit.

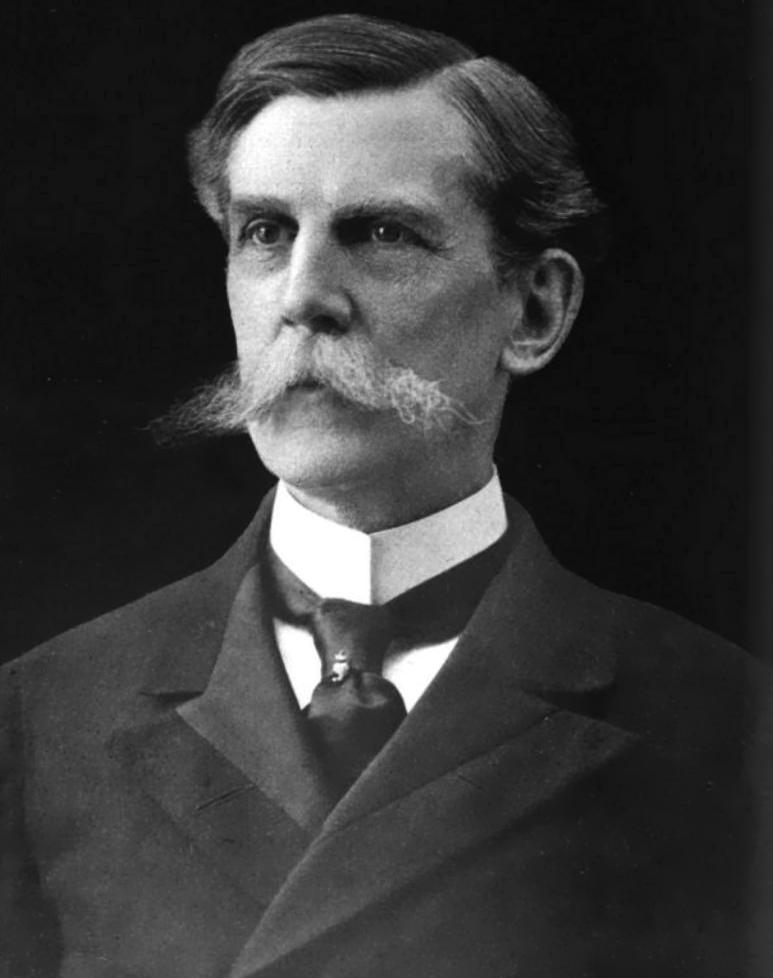
Oliver Wendell Holmes Jr. as he appeared when Roosevelt appointed him to the United States Supreme Court.

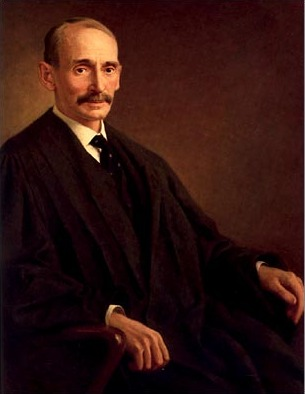
William R. Day, another of Roosevelt's Supreme Court appointees.

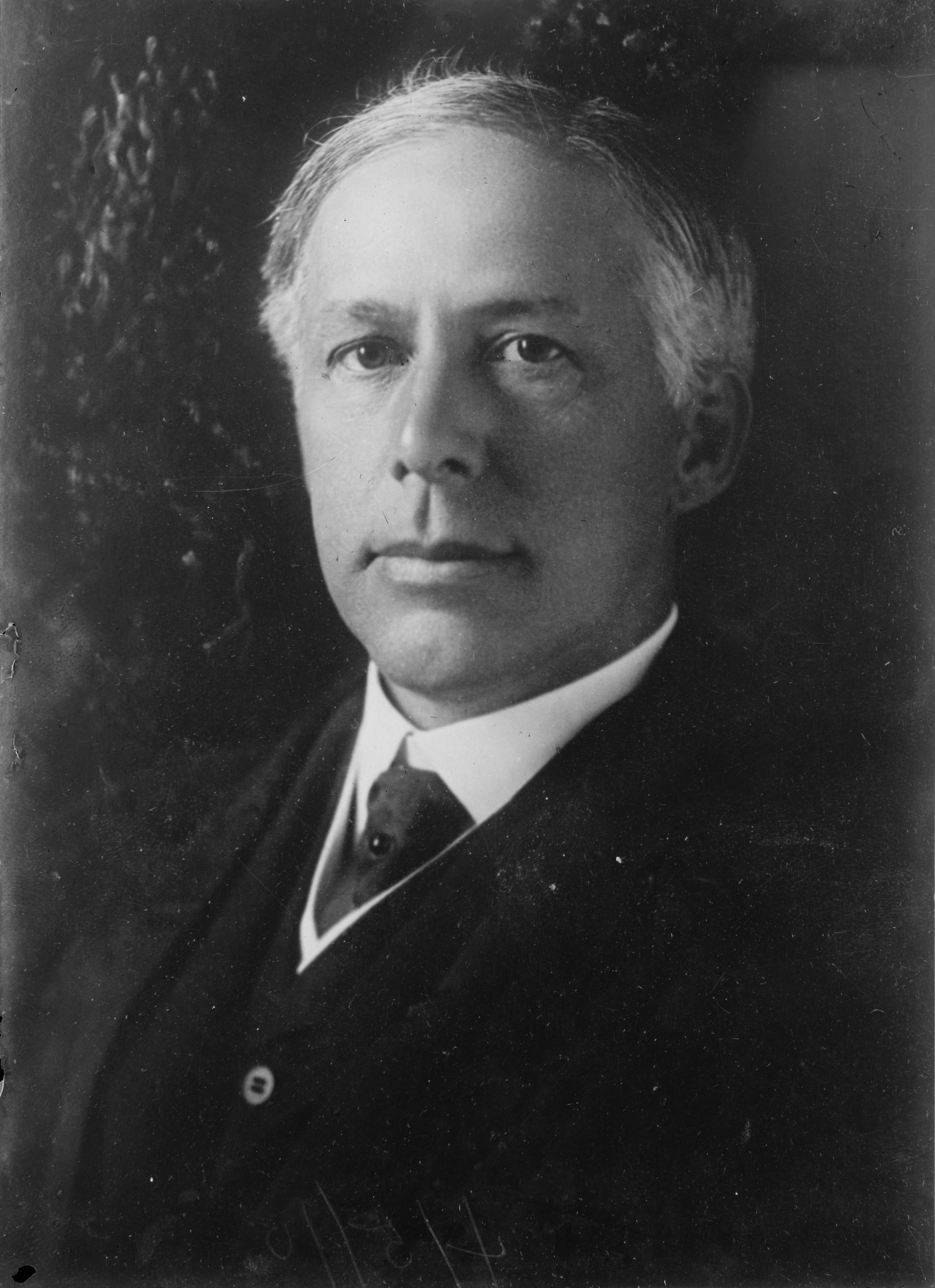
Willis Van Devanter, appointed by Roosevelt to the Eighth Circuit, would later serve on the Supreme Court.

== United States Supreme Court justices ==
#	Justice	Seat	State	Former justice	Nomination date	Confirmation date	Began active service	Ended active service
1	Oliver Wendell Holmes Jr.	2	Massachusetts	Horace Gray	December 2, 1902	December 4, 1902	December 4, 1902	January 12, 1932
2	William R. Day	10	Ohio	George Shiras Jr.	February 19, 1903	February 23, 1903	February 23, 1903	November 13, 1922
3	William Henry Moody	4	Massachusetts	Henry Billings Brown	December 3, 1906	December 12, 1906	December 12, 1906	November 20, 1910

== Courts of appeals and circuit courts ==
The United States circuit courts were abolished on January 1, 1912, the final day of service being December 31, 1911. The United States circuit court in the District of Columbia was abolished in 1863. Therefore, those individuals who served in the D.C. Circuit served only on the Court of Appeals and had no Circuit Court service.

#	Judge	Circuit	Nomination date	Confirmation date	Began active service	Ended active service	Ended senior status
1	Francis E. Baker	Seventh	December 11, 1901	January 21, 1902	January 21, 1902	March 15, 1924	–
2	William Kneeland Townsend	Second	January 15, 1902	January 21, 1902	January 21, 1902	June 2, 1907	–
3	Alfred Conkling Coxe Sr.	Second	May 29, 1902	June 3, 1902	June 3, 1902	July 31, 1917	–
4	Willis Van Devanter	Eighth	February 4, 1903	February 18, 1903	February 18, 1903	December 16, 1910	Elevated
5	John K. Richards	Sixth	February 19, 1903	February 23, 1903	February 23, 1903	March 1, 1909	–
6	William Cather Hook	Eighth	November 10, 1903	November 17, 1903	November 17, 1903	August 11, 1921	–
7	Jeter Connelly Pritchard	Fourth	April 27, 1904	April 27, 1904	April 27, 1904	April 10, 1921	–
8	Charles Holland Duell	D.C.	December 16, 1904	January 5, 1905	January 5, 1905	August 31, 1906	–
9	Seth Shepard	D.C.	December 16, 1904	January 5, 1905	January 5, 1905	September 30, 1917	–
10	Francis Cabot Lowell	First	February 15, 1905	February 23, 1905	February 23, 1905	March 6, 1911	–
11	William Henry Seaman	Seventh	February 25, 1905	March 1, 1905	March 1, 1905	March 8, 1915	–
12	Christian Cecil Kohlsaat	Seventh	March 18, 1905	March 18, 1905	March 18, 1905	May 11, 1918	–
13	Elmer B. Adams	Eighth	December 5, 1905	December 12, 1905	May 20, 1905	October 24, 1916	–
14	Louis E. McComas	D.C.	December 5, 1905	December 6, 1905	June 26, 1905	November 10, 1907	–
15	Joseph Buffington	Third	December 3, 1906	December 11, 1906	September 25, 1906	June 1, 1938	October 21, 1947
16	Charles Henry Robb	D.C.	December 3, 1906	December 11, 1906	October 5, 1906	November 15, 1937	June 10, 1939
17	Henry Galbraith Ward	Second	December 3, 1907	December 17, 1907	May 18, 1907	June 30, 1921	October 31, 1924
18	Walter Chadwick Noyes	Second	December 3, 1907	December 10, 1907	September 18, 1907	July 1, 1913	–
19	Josiah Alexander Van Orsdel	D.C.	December 3, 1907	December 12, 1907	November 14, 1907	August 7, 1937	–

== District courts ==
#	Judge	Court (Note: See List of United States district and territorial courts)	Nomination date	Confirmation date	Began active service	Ended active service	Ended senior status
1	Robert W. Archbald	M.D. Pa.	December 5, 1901	December 17, 1901	March 29, 1901	February 1, 1911	Elevated
2	Thomas H. Anderson	D.D.C.	December 5, 1901	February 4, 1902	April 23, 1901	October 1, 1916	–
3	Andrew McConnell January Cochran	E.D. Ky.	December 5, 1901	December 17, 1901	April 24, 1901	June 12, 1934	–
4	Benjamin Franklin Keller	S.D. W. Va.	December 5, 1901	December 17, 1901	June 18, 1901	August 8, 1921	–
5	George B. Adams	S.D.N.Y.	December 5, 1901	December 17, 1901	August 30, 1901	October 9, 1911	–
6	Thomas G. Jones	M.D. Ala. N.D. Ala.	December 5, 1901	December 17, 1901	October 7, 1901	April 28, 1914	–
7	Henry C. McDowell Jr.	W.D. Va.	December 5, 1901	December 18, 1901	November 12, 1901	September 1, 1931	October 8, 1933
8	James Perry Platt	D. Conn.	February 18, 1902	February 28, 1902	February 28, 1902	January 26, 1913	–
9	Waller Thomas Burns	S.D. Tex.	April 12, 1902	April 24, 1902	April 22, 1902	November 17, 1917	–
10	Clarence Hale	D. Me.	May 13, 1902	May 19, 1902	May 19, 1902	January 1, 1922	April 9, 1934
11	George W. Ray	N.D.N.Y	December 2, 1902	December 8, 1902	September 12, 1902	January 10, 1925	–
12	Albert B. Anderson	D. Ind.	December 8, 1902	December 8, 1902	December 8, 1902	January 13, 1925	Elevated
13	Ashley Mulgrave Gould	D.D.C.	December 2, 1902	December 8, 1902	December 8, 1902	May 20, 1921	–
14	George Chandler Holt	S.D.N.Y.	March 2, 1903	March 3, 1903	March 3, 1903	January 16, 1914	–
15	Page Morris	D. Minn.	February 19, 1903 (Note: Renominated on March 5, 1903.)	March 9, 1903	March 9, 1903	June 30, 1923	December 16, 1924
16	Harry M. Clabaugh	D.D.C.	November 10, 1903	November 16, 1903	April 1, 1903	March 6, 1914	–
17	Jeter Connelly Pritchard	D.D.C.	November 10, 1903	November 16, 1903	November 16, 1903	June 1, 1904	Elevated
18	Daniel Thew Wright	D.D.C.	November 10, 1903	November 17, 1903	November 17, 1903	November 15, 1914	–
19	John Calvin Pollock	D. Kan.	November 25, 1903	December 1, 1903	December 1, 1903	January 24, 1937	–
20	Henry Thomas Reed	N.D. Iowa	March 5, 1904	March 7, 1904	March 7, 1904	November 30, 1921	February 22, 1924
21	James Buchanan Holland	E.D. Pa.	April 14, 1904	April 19, 1904	April 19, 1904	April 24, 1914	–
22	William Henry Hunt	D. Mont.	April 14, 1904	April 19, 1904	April 19, 1904	March 30, 1910	Elevated
23	William M. Lanning	D.N.J.	December 6, 1904	December 13, 1904	June 1, 1904	May 24, 1909	Elevated
24	Wendell Phillips Stafford	D.D.C.	December 6, 1904	December 13, 1904	June 1, 1904	May 4, 1931	–
25	Arthur Loomis Sanborn	W.D. Wis.	January 6, 1905	January 9, 1905	January 9, 1905	October 18, 1920	–
26	Robert Walker Tayler	N.D. Ohio	January 6, 1905	January 10, 1905	January 10, 1905	November 25, 1910	–
27	John E. McCall	W.D. Tenn.	January 9, 1905	January 17, 1905	January 17, 1905	August 8, 1920	–
28	Frederic Dodge	D. Mass.	February 15, 1905	February 23, 1905	February 23, 1905	September 10, 1912	Elevated
29	Joseph V. Quarles	E.D. Wis.	February 25, 1905 (Note: Renominated on March 6, 1905.)	March 6, 1905	March 6, 1905	October 7, 1911	–
30	Alston G. Dayton	N.D. W. Va.	March 7, 1905	March 14, 1905	March 14, 1905	July 30, 1920	–
31	Edward Whitson	E.D. Wash.	March 10, 1905	March 14, 1905	March 14, 1905	October 15, 1910	–
32	Joseph Cross	D.N.J.	March 13, 1905	March 17, 1905	March 17, 1905	October 29, 1913	–
33	Francis Marion Wright	E.D. Ill.	March 14, 1905	March 17, 1905	March 17, 1905	July 15, 1917	–
34	Solomon H. Bethea	N.D. Ill.	March 18, 1905	March 18, 1905	March 18, 1905	August 3, 1909	–
35	Kenesaw Mountain Landis	N.D. Ill.	March 18, 1905	March 18, 1905	March 18, 1905	February 28, 1922	–
36	Gustavus A. Finkelnburg	E.D. Mo.	December 5, 1905	December 12, 1905	May 20, 1905	March 31, 1907	–
37	Charles E. Wolverton	D. Ore.	December 5, 1905	January 10, 1906	November 20, 1905	September 21, 1926	–
38	Robert E. Lewis	D. Colo.	April 9, 1906	April 10, 1906	April 10, 1906	December 1, 1921	Elevated
39	Charles Merrill Hough	S.D.N.Y.	June 20, 1906	June 27, 1906	June 27, 1906	September 5, 1916	Elevated
40	Nathaniel Ewing	W.D. Pa.	December 3, 1906	December 11, 1906	September 25, 1906	January 31, 1908	–
41	James Loren Martin	D. Vt.	December 3, 1906	December 11, 1906	October 20, 1906	January 14, 1915	–
42	Loyal Edwin Knappen	W.D. Mich.	December 3, 1906	December 10, 1906	December 10, 1906	February 8, 1910	Elevated
43	Thomas Chatfield	E.D.N.Y.	December 10, 1906 (Note: Nomination withdrawn on December 17, 1906. Renominated on December 13, 1906.)	January 9, 1907	January 9, 1907	December 24, 1922	–
44	Edward Silsby Farrington	D. Nev.	December 19, 1906	January 10, 1907	January 10, 1907	April 30, 1928	August 31, 1929
45	Eugene Davis Saunders	E.D. La.	February 11, 1907	February 20, 1907	February 20, 1907	February 8, 1909	–
46	David Patterson Dyer	E.D. Mo.	February 27, 1907	March 1, 1907	March 1, 1907	November 3, 1919	April 29, 1924
47	Thomas Charles Munger	D. Neb.	February 27, 1907	March 1, 1907	March 1, 1907	July 31, 1941	November 29, 1941
48	John Elbert Sater	S.D. Ohio	December 3, 1907	–	March 18, 1907	May 30, 1908	–
48.1	John Elbert Sater	S.D. Ohio	December 8, 1908	March 1, 1909	May 30, 1908	November 18, 1924	–
49	Frank Sigel Dietrich	D. Idaho	December 3, 1907	December 17, 1907	March 19, 1907	January 18, 1927	Elevated
50	William Cary Van Fleet	N.D. Cal.	December 3, 1907	December 17, 1907	April 2, 1907	September 3, 1923	–
51	Oscar Richard Hundley	N.D. Ala.	December 3, 1907	–	April 9, 1907	May 30, 1908	–
51.1	Oscar Richard Hundley	N.D. Ala.	December 8, 1908	–	May 30, 1908	March 3, 1909	–
52	William Bostwick Sheppard	N.D. Fla.	December 3, 1907	May 20, 1908	September 4, 1907	April 21, 1934	–
53	Ralph E. Campbell	E.D. Okla.	December 3, 1907	January 13, 1908	November 11, 1907	August 31, 1918	–
54	John Hazelton Cotteral	W.D. Okla.	December 3, 1907	January 13, 1908	November 11, 1907	May 23, 1928	Elevated
55	James Scott Young	W.D. Pa.	January 14, 1908	January 22, 1908	January 22, 1908	February 25, 1914	–
56	Edward Terry Sanford	E.D. Tenn. M.D. Tenn.	May 14, 1908	May 18, 1908	May 18, 1908	February 5, 1923	Elevated
57	Milton D. Purdy	D. Minn.	April 23, 1908 (Note: Renominated on December 8, 1908.)	–	July 6, 1908	March 3, 1909	–
58	Rufus Edward Foster	E.D. La.	January 22, 1909	February 2, 1909	February 2, 1909	January 13, 1925	Elevated

== Specialty courts (Article I) ==
=== United States Court of Claims ===
#	Judge	Nomination date	Confirmation date	Began active service	Ended active service
1	Francis Marion Wright	December 2, 1902	January 13, 1903	January 13, 1903	March 16, 1905
2	Fenton Whitlock Booth	March 14, 1905	March 17, 1905	March 17, 1905	April 23, 1928
3	George W. Atkinson	December 5, 1905	January 16, 1906	April 15, 1905	April 16, 1916
4	Samuel S. Barney	December 19, 1905	December 20, 1905	December 20, 1905	April 15, 1919
5	Stanton J. Peelle	December 19, 1905	December 20, 1905	December 20, 1905	February 11, 1913

=== Board of General Appraisers ===
#	Judge	Nomination date	Confirmation date	Began active service	Ended active service
1	Byron Sylvester Waite	June 13, 1902	June 19, 1902	June 25, 1902	November 1, 1930
2	Charles P. McClelland	November 10, 1903	December 7, 1903	August 21, 1903	September 30, 1939
3	Eugene Gano Hay	November 10, 1903	November 24, 1903	September 21, 1903	November 30, 1923
4	Roy Chamberlain	December 8, 1908	January 11, 1909	June 3, 1908	March 3, 1913

== Notes ==
Renominations

== Sources ==
- Federal Judicial Center
