= Nicholas J. Sinnott =

American politician

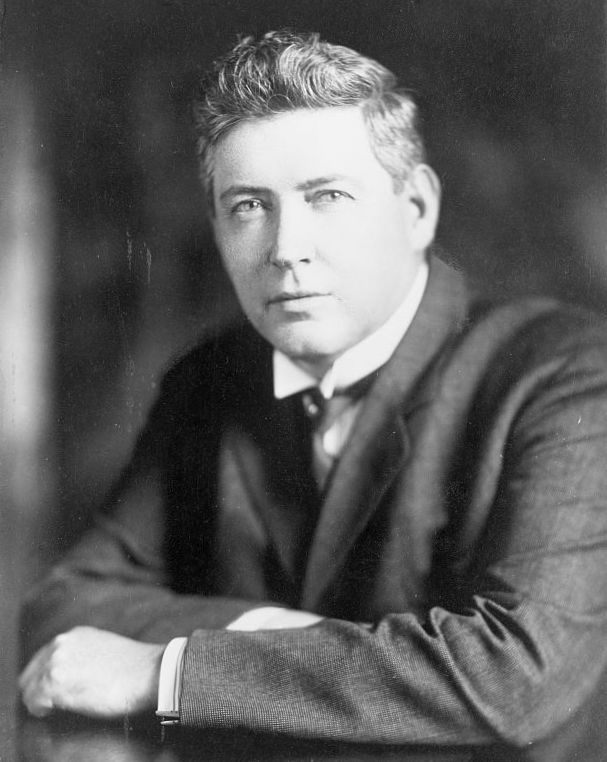

Judge of the Court of Claims
- In office April 20, 1928 – July 20, 1929
- Appointed by: Calvin Coolidge
- Preceded by: Fenton Whitlock Booth
- Succeeded by: Thomas Sutler Williams

Member of the U.S. House of Representatives from Oregon's 2nd district
- In office March 4, 1913 – May 31, 1928
- Preceded by: Walter Lafferty
- Succeeded by: Robert R. Butler

Member of the Oregon State Senate
- In office 1909–1913
- Preceded by: C. W. Hodson
- Succeeded by: Robert R. Butler
- Constituency: Wasco County, Oregon

Personal details
- Born: Nicholas John Sinnott; December 6, 1870 The Dalles, Oregon, U.S.
- Died: July 20, 1929 (aged 58) Washington, D.C., U.S.
- Resting place: St. Peters Cemetery; The Dalles, Oregon
- Party: Republican
- Education: University of Notre Dame (A.B.) read law

Nicholas John Sinnott (December 6, 1870 – July 20, 1929) was an American lawyer and a United States representative from Oregon from 1913 to 1928. President Calvin Coolidge made him a federal judge on the Court of Claims, serving from 1928 to 1929.

== Education and career ==
Sinnott was born on December 6, 1870, in The Dalles, Wasco County, Oregon. His father was Colonel N. B. Sinnott and his mother was Mary Brass Sinnott. He attended public schools and the Wasco Independent Academy at The Dalles. He received an Artium Baccalaureus degree in 1892 from the University of Notre Dame and read law with Alfred S. Bennett in 1895. He was admitted to the bar and entered private practice in The Dalles from 1885 to 1912. He served as a Republican member of the Oregon State Senate from Wasco County from 1909 to 1913, being elected in 1909 and 1911.

== Congressional career ==
Sinnott was elected as a Republican to the United States House of Representatives of the 63rd United States Congress and to the seven succeeding Congresses and served from March 4, 1913, until his resignation effective May 31, 1928. He was Chairman of the United States House Committee on Public Lands for the 66th through 70th United States Congresses and of the United States House Committee on Patents for the 70th United States Congress. While in the House he worked to create and enlarge water reclamation projects in Eastern Oregon.

== Federal judicial career ==
Sinnott was nominated by President Calvin Coolidge on April 18, 1928, to a seat on the Court of Claims (later the United States Court of Claims) vacated by Judge Fenton Whitlock Booth. He was confirmed by the United States Senate on April 20, 1928, and received his commission the same day. His service terminated on July 20, 1929, due to his death in Washington, D.C. He was interred in St. Peters Cemetery in The Dalles.

== Personal ==
In 1901, Sinnott married Dora Purcell; they had six children.

== Museum ==
The Sinnott Memorial Observation Station and museum at Crater Lake National Park was dedicated in Sinnott's honor on July 16, 1931.

== See also ==
- List of United States representatives from Oregon

== Sources ==
- United States Congress. "Nicholas J. Sinnott (id: S000450)". Biographical Directory of the United States Congress.
- "Sinnott, Nicholas John - Federal Judicial Center". www.fjc.gov.

U.S. House of Representatives
Preceded by Walter Lafferty	Member of the U.S. House of Representatives from Oregon's 2nd congressional district 1913–1928	Succeeded by Robert R. Butler
Legal offices
Preceded by Fenton Whitlock Booth	Judge of the Court of Claims; 1928–1929	Succeeded by Thomas Sutler Williams
