= Robert R. Butler =

American politician

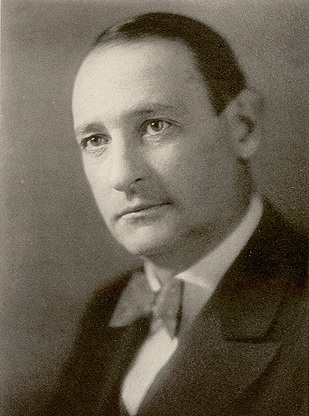

Member of the U.S. House of Representatives from Oregon's 2nd district
- In office November 6, 1928 – January 7, 1933
- Preceded by: Nicholas J. Sinnott
- Succeeded by: Walter M. Pierce

Member of the Oregon Senate
- In office 1913–1917; 1925–1929

Personal details
- Born: Robert Reyburn Butler; September 24, 1881 Butler, Tennessee, U.S.
- Died: January 7, 1933 (aged 51) Washington, D.C., U.S.
- Resting place: Odd Fellows Cemetery in The Dalles
- Party: Republican
- Occupation: attorney

Robert Reyburn Butler (September 24, 1881 – January 7, 1933) was an American lawyer, politician, and jurist who served as a U.S. representative from Oregon from 1928 to 1933.. He also served in the Oregon State Senate and as a state circuit court judge in Oregon.

== Early life ==
Butler was born in Butler, Tennessee, where he attended the public schools and then Holly Springs College. He was the son of Rebecca C. Grayson and William P. Butler, and a grandson of Congressman Roderick R. Butler. He graduated from Cumberland School of Law in Lebanon, Tennessee, in 1903. He was admitted to the bar and commenced practice in Mountain City, Tennessee. In 1906, Butler moved to Condon, Oregon, and resumed the practice of law. In 1911, Butler was married, with the marriage producing a single daughter.

== Political career ==
In Oregon he served as mayor of Condon, before being appointed as circuit judge for the eleventh judicial district of Oregon and served from February 1909 until his retirement in January 1911. He held court for Sherman, Wheeler, and Gilliam counties in Eastern Oregon. In 1911, he moved to The Dalles, Oregon, and resumed the practice of law.

He served as member of the Oregon State Senate twice, from 1913 to 1917, and again from 1925 to 1929.

In 1928, Nicholas J. Sinnott resigned his position representing Oregon's 2nd congressional district in the United States House of Representatives. Butler, a Republican, defeated Walter M. Pierce in a special election to complete the remaining two months of Sinnott's term, and on the same day, was elected to the full term for the next Congress. Butler was re-elected to a second term in 1930, defeating Democrat Robert E. Bradford.

In 1932, Butler faced his 1928 opponent Walter Pierce, but this time, Pierce won.

== Death and burial ==
Shortly after the election, Butler fell ill with pneumonia and on January 7, 1933, died of heart failure in a Washington, D.C. hospital. He was interred in the Odd Fellows Cemetery in The Dalles.

== See also ==
- List of members of the United States Congress who died in office (1900–1949)

U.S. House of Representatives
Preceded by Nicholas J. Sinnott	Member of the U.S. House of Representatives from Oregon's 2nd congressional district November 6, 1928 – January 7, 1933	Succeeded by Walter M. Pierce
