= John Davis (United States Court of Claims judge) =

American judge (1851–1902)

Judge of the Court of Claims
- In office January 20, 1885 – May 5, 1902
- Appointed by: Chester A. Arthur
- Preceded by: William Adams Richardson
- Succeeded by: Francis Marion Wright

Personal details
- Born: John Davis; September 16, 1851 Newton, Massachusetts, U.S.
- Died: May 5, 1902 (aged 50) Washington, D.C., U.S.
- Relatives: John Davis; Bancroft Davis
- Education: University of Paris; Heidelberg University; Humboldt University of Berlin read law

John Davis (September 16, 1851 – May 5, 1902) was a judge of the Court of Claims.

== Education and career ==
Born on September 16, 1851, in Newton, Massachusetts, Davis attended the University of Paris in France, Heidelberg University in the German Empire, Frederick William University (now Humboldt University of Berlin) in the German Empire, then read law in 1874. He was a clerk with the United States Department of State from 1870 to 1872. He was a private secretary for United States Agent Bancroft Davis of the Joint High Commission in Geneva, Switzerland in 1872. He was a private secretary for United States Secretary of State Hamilton Fish from 1872 to 1873. He was a clerk for the Court of Commissioners of Alabama Claims in 1874. He entered private practice in New York City, New York and Washington, D.C. from 1874 to 1881. He was an assistant counsel of the United States for the French-American Claims Commission from 1881 to 1882. He was first assistant and acting secretary of state from 1882 to 1885.

== Federal judicial service ==
Davis was nominated by President Chester A. Arthur on January 15, 1885, to a seat on the Court of Claims (later the United States Court of Claims) vacated by Judge William Adams Richardson. He was confirmed by the United States Senate on January 20, 1885, and received his commission the same day. His service terminated on May 5, 1902, due to his death in Washington, D.C.

=== Notable case ===
Davis wrote the opinion in Gray v. United States, the lead case settling claims dating from the Quasi-War between the United States and France.

== Family ==
Davis was the grandson of John Davis, Massachusetts governor, Congressman and Senator, and nephew of Bancroft Davis, a Court of Claims judge.

== Sources ==
- "Davis, John - Federal Judicial Center". www.fjc.gov.

Legal offices
Preceded by William Adams Richardson	Judge of the Court of Claims; 1885–1902	Succeeded by Francis Marion Wright
