= United States Court of Claims =

Defunct federal court

The Court of Claims was a federal court in the United States that heard lawsuits involving monetary claims against the U.S. government. It was established in 1855 and renamed the United States Court of Claims in 1948. In 1982, the U.S. Congress abolished the court and transferred its jurisdiction to the newly created U.S. Claims Court, now known as the U.S. Court of Federal Claims, and the newly created U.S. Court of Appeals for the Federal Circuit.

Before the Court of Claims was established, monetary claims against the federal government were normally submitted through petitions to Congress. By the time of the Court's creation, the workload had become unwieldy so Congress gave the Court jurisdiction to hear all monetary claims based upon a law, a regulation, or a federal government contract. The Court was required to report its findings to Congress and to prepare bills for payments to claimants whose petitions were approved by the Court. Since only Congress was constitutionally empowered to make appropriations, Congress still had to approve the bills and reports, but it usually did so pro forma.

The Court originally had three judges, who were given lifetime appointments. The judges were authorized to appoint commissioners to take depositions and issue subpoenas. The federal government was represented in the Court by a solicitor appointed by the President.

== Establishment of Court ==
Prior to the establishment of the Court, members of Congress believed that it would be a violation of sovereign immunity and the separation of powers to empower an institution to provide monetary awards from the Treasury. However, over time, the workload related to the assessment of monetary claims became heavier, leading members of Congress to change its interpretation of the Constitution and seek to establish an institution to alleviate the workload.

The Court of Claims was established in 1855 to adjudicate certain claims brought against the United States government by veterans of the Mexican–American War. Initially, the court met at the Willard Hotel, from May to June 1855, when it moved to the US Capitol. There, the court met in the Supreme Court's chamber in the basement of the Capitol until it was given its space to use.

In 1861, Abraham Lincoln in his Annual Message to Congress asked that the court be given the power to issue final judgments. Congress granted the power with the Act of March 3, 1863, and it explicitly allowed the judgments to be appealed to the Supreme Court. However, it also modified the law governing the Court so that its reports and bills were sent to the Department of the Treasury rather than directly to Congress. The moneys to cover these costs were then made a part of the appropriation for the Treasury Department.

The conflict inherent between the two provisions was made manifest when in 1864, the decision in Gordon v. United States was appealed to the Supreme Court. The Supreme Court denied that it had jurisdiction because the decisions of the Court of Claims, hence any appeals, were subject to review by an executive department. Less than a year later, Congress passed a law removing review of the Court of Claims from the Treasury Department.

== Tucker Act ==
In 1887, Congress passed the Tucker Act (24 Stat. 505), which further restricted the claims that could be submitted directly to Congress and required the claims instead to be submitted to the Court of Claims. It broadened the court's jurisdiction so that "claims founded upon the Constitution" could be heard. In particular, this meant that monetary claims based on takings under the eminent domain clause of the Fifth Amendment could be brought before the Court of Claims. The Tucker Act also opened the Court to tax refund suits.

Depredations against American shipping committed by the French during the Quasi-War of 1793 to 1800 led to claims against France that were relinquished by the terms of the Treaty of 1800. Since the claims against France were no longer valid, claimants continually petitioned Congress for the relief that had been waived by the treaty. Only on January 20, 1885, a law was passed, 23 Stat. 283, to provide for consideration of the matter before the Court of Claims. The lead case, Gray v. United States, 21 Ct. Cl. 340, written by Judge John Davis, includes a complete discussion of the historical and political circumstances that led to the hostilities between the United States and France and their resolution by treaty. The cases, termed "French Spoliation Claims", continued in the court until 1915.

In 1925, Congress changed the structure of the Court of Claims by authorizing the Court to appoint seven commissioners who were empowered to hear evidence in judicial proceedings and report on findings of fact. The judges of the Court of Claims would then serve as a board of review for the commissioners.

In 1932, Congress reduced the salary of the judges of the Court of Claims as part of the Legislative Appropriation Act of 1932. Thomas Sutler Williams was one of the judges of the Court, and he sued the federal government by claiming that his salary could not be cut because the Constitution had specified that judicial salaries could not be reduced. The Supreme Court ruled on Williams v. United States in 1933, deciding that the Court of Claims was an Article I or legislative court and so Congress had the authority to reduce the salaries of the judges of the Court of Claims.

Beginning in 1948, Congress directed that when directed by the court, the commissioner could make recommendations for conclusions of law (62 Stat. 976). Chief Judge Wilson Cowen made that mandatory under the court rules in 1964.

== Elevation to Article III status ==
On July 28, 1953, Congress passed a law to convert the Court of Claims into an Article III court and to raise the number of commissioners to 15. In spite of the Congressional statement of the Court's status, when Judge J. Warren Madden was sitting by designation with the United States Court of Appeals for the Second Circuit, one of the parties asked for the decision to be thrown out on the basis that Madden was not a valid judge in that court. On appeal, the Supreme Court, in Glidden Co. v. Zdanok, held that the Court of Claims was a proper Article III court, and its judges could sit by designation and assignment on other courts. Ironically, the judges could no longer sit on Congressional reference cases because of this change since an independent court could not act in an advisory role to Congress. The solution, enacted by Congress in 1966, was to have the trial judges hear the cases, upon assignment by the chief judge of the trial division.

Two more judges were added to the court in 1966, bringing the total to seven.

Congress terminated the Indian Claims Commission in 1978 and required that any pending cases to be transferred to the Court of Claims. Of the 170 cases so transferred, many were complicated longstanding accounting claims that had been before the Commission for years. One of the most famous of these cases was United States v. Sioux Nation of Indians, which ultimately reached the Supreme Court. Aside from its large judgment awarded to the Sioux, the case also featured interesting questions about judicial power and the ability of Congress to waive the Federal government's legal defense of res judicata to allow a claim to be judicially determined.

== Abolition ==
In 1982, Congress abolished the court, transferring its trial level jurisdiction to the new United States Claims Court, now known as the United States Court of Federal Claims, and its appellate jurisdiction to the equally-new United States Court of Appeals for the Federal Circuit. By then, the Court had expanded to have seven judges; they were transferred to the Federal Circuit.

== Former judges ==
#	Judge	State	Born–died	Active service	Chief Judge	Senior status	Appointed by	Reason for termination
1	Isaac Blackford	IN	1786–1859	1855–1859	1858–1859	–	Pierce	death
2	John Gilchrist	NH	1809–1858	1855–1858	1855–1858	–	Pierce	death
3	George Parker Scarburgh	VA	1807–1879	1855–1861 (Note: Recess appointment; formally nominated on January 22, 1856, confirmed by the United States Senate on February 11, 1856, and received commission the same day)	–	–	Pierce	resignation
4	Edward G. Loring	MA	1802–1890	1858–1877	1859–1863	–	Buchanan	resignation
5	James Hughes	IN	1823–1873	1860–1864	–	–	Buchanan	resignation
6	Joseph Casey	PA	1814–1879	1861–1870 (Note: Recess appointment; formally nominated on July 9, 1861, confirmed by the Senate on July 22, 1861, and received commission the same day)	1863–1870	–	Lincoln; Lincoln (as chief justice)	resignation
7	David Wilmot	PA	1814–1868	1863–1868	–	–	Lincoln	death
8	Ebenezer Peck	IL	1805–1881	1863–1878	–	–	Lincoln	resignation
9	Charles C. Nott	NY	1827–1916	1865–1905	1896–1905	–	Lincoln; Cleveland (as chief justice)	resignation
10	Samuel Milligan	TN	1814–1874	1868–1974	–	–	A. Johnson	death
11	Charles D. Drake	MO	1811–1892	1870–1885	1870–1885	–	Grant (as chief justice)	resignation
12	William Adams Richardson	MA	1821–1896	1874–1896	1885–1896	–	Grant; Arthur (as chief justice)	death
13	Bancroft Davis	NY	1822–1907	1877–1881; 1882–1883	–	–	Hayes; Arthur	resignation resignation
14	William H. Hunt	LA	1823–1884	1878–1881	–	–	Hayes	resignation
15	Glenni William Scofield	PA	1817–1891	1881–1891	–	–	Garfield	resignation
16	Lawrence Weldon	IL	1829–1905	1883–1905 (Note: Recess appointment; formally nominated on December 12, 1883, confirmed by the Senate on December 18, 1883, and received commission the same day)	–	–	Arthur	death
17	John Davis	DC	1851–1902	1885–1902	–	–	Arthur	death
18	Stanton J. Peelle	IN	1843–1928	1892–1913	1905–1913	–	Harrison; T. Roosevelt (as chief justice)	resignation
19	Charles Bowen Howry	MS	1844–1928	1896–1915 (Note: Recess appointment; formally nominated on December 8, 1896, confirmed by the Senate on January 28, 1897, and received commission the same day)	–	–	Cleveland	resignation
20	Francis Marion Wright	IL	1844–1917	1903–1905	–	–	T. Roosevelt	reappointment
21	Fenton Whitlock Booth	IL	1869–1947	1905–1939	1928–1939	1939–1947	T. Roosevelt; Coolidge (as chief justice)	death
22	George W. Atkinson	WV	1845–1925	1905–1916 (Note: Recess appointment; formally nominated on December 5, 1905, confirmed by the Senate on January 16, 1906, and received commission the same day)	–	–	T. Roosevelt	resignation
23	Samuel S. Barney	WI	1846–1919	1905–1919	–	–	T. Roosevelt	retirement
24	Edward Kernan Campbell	AL	1858–1938	1913–1928	1913–1928	1928–1938	Wilson (as chief justice)	death
25	George Eddy Downey	IN	1860–1926	1915–1926 (Note: Recess appointment; formally nominated on January 7, 1916, confirmed by the Senate on January 17, 1916, and received commission the same day)	–	–	Wilson	death
26	James Hay	VA	1856–1931	1916–1927	–	1927–1931	Wilson	death
27	Samuel Jordan Graham	PA	1859–1951	1919–1930	–	1930–1951	Wilson	death
28	J. McKenzie Moss	KY	1868–1929	1926–1929	–	–	Coolidge	death
29	William R. Green	IA	1856–1947	1928–1940	–	1940–1947	Coolidge	death
30	Nicholas J. Sinnott	OR	1870–1929	1928–1929	–	–	Coolidge	death
31	Thomas Sutler Williams	IL	1872–1940	1929–1940	–	–	Hoover	death
32	Benjamin Horsley Littleton	TN	1889–1966	1929–1958	–	1958–1966	Hoover	death
33	Richard S. Whaley	SC	1874–1951	1930–1947	1939–1947	1947–1951	Hoover; F. Roosevelt (as chief justice)	death
34	Samuel Estill Whitaker	TN	1886–1967	1939–1964	–	1964–1967	F. Roosevelt	death
35	John Marvin Jones	TX	1882–1976	1940–1964	1947–1964	1964–1976	F. Roosevelt; Truman (as chief justice)	death
36	J. Warren Madden	PA	1890–1972	1941–1961	–	1961–1972	Truman	death
37	George Evan Howell	IL	1905–1980	1947–1953	–	–	Truman	resignation
38	Don Nelson Laramore	IN	1906–1989	1954–1972	–	1972–1982	Eisenhower	reassignment
39	James Randall Durfee	WI	1897–1977	1960–1972	–	1972–1977	Eisenhower	death
40	Oscar Hirsh Davis	NY	1914–1988	1962–1982	–	–	Kennedy	reassignment
41	Arnold Wilson Cowen	MD	1905–1907	1964–1977	1964–1977	1977–1982	L. Johnson (as chief judge)	reassignment
43	Linton McGee Collins	DC	1902–1972	1964–1972	–	–	L. Johnson	death
42	Philip Nichols Jr.	MA	1907–1990	1966–1982	–	–	L. Johnson	reassignment
44	Byron George Skelton	TX	1905–2004	1966–1977	–	1977–1982	L. Johnson	reassignment
45	Shiro Kashiwa	HI	1912–1998	1972–1982	–	–	Nixon	reassignment
46	Robert Lowe Kunzig	PA	1918–1982	1972–1982	–	–	Nixon	death
47	Marion T. Bennett	MD	1914–2000	1972–1982	–	–	Nixon	reassignment
48	Daniel Mortimer Friedman	DC	1916–2011	1978–1982	1978–1982	–	Carter (as chief judge)	reassignment
49	Edward Samuel Smith	MD	1919–2001	1978–1982	–	–	Carter	reassignment

== Succession of seats ==
Seat 1
Established as Judge of the Court of Claims on February 24, 1855, by 10 Stat. 612
Blackford	IN	1855–1859
Hughes	IN	1860–1864
Nott	NY	1865–1896
Howry	MS	1896–1915
Downey	IN	1915–1926
Moss	KY	1926–1929
Littleton	TN	1929–1948
Redesignated as Associate Judge of the United States Court of Claims on September 1, 1948, by 62 Stat. 898
Littleton	TN	1948–1958
Durfee	WI	1960–1972
Kashiwa	HI	1972–1982
Reassigned to United States Court of Appeals for the Federal Circuit on October 1, 1982, by 96 Stat. 25

Seat 2
Established as Judge of the Court of Claims on February 24, 1855, by 10 Stat. 612
Gilchrist	NH	1855–1858
Loring	MA	1858–1877
B. Davis	NY	1877–1881; 1882–1883
Weldon	IL	1883–1905
Atkinson	WV	1905–1916
Hay	VA	1916–1927
Green	IA	1928–1940
Madden	PA	1941–1948
Redesignated as Associate Judge of the United States Court of Claims on September 1, 1948, by 62 Stat. 898
Madden	PA	1948–1961
O. Davis	NY	1962–1982
Reassigned to United States Court of Appeals for the Federal Circuit on October 1, 1982, by 96 Stat. 25

Seat 3
Established as Judge of the Court of Claims on February 24, 1855, by 10 Stat. 612
Scarburgh	VA	1855–1861
Casey	PA	1861–1863
Redesignated as Chief Justice of the Court of Claims on March 3, 1863, by 12 Stat. 765
Casey	PA	1863–1870
Drake	MO	1870–1885
Richardson	MA	1885–1896
Nott	NY	1896–1905
Peelle	IN	1905–1913
Campbell	AL	1913–1928
Booth	IL	1928–1939
Whaley	SC	1939–1947
Jones	TX	1947–1948
Redesignated as Chief Judge of the United States Court of Claims on September 1, 1948, by 62 Stat. 898
Jones	TX	1948–1964
Cowen	MD	1964–1977
Friedman	DC	1978–1982
Reassigned to United States Court of Appeals for the Federal Circuit on October 1, 1982, by 96 Stat. 25

Seat 4
Established as Judge of the Court of Claims on March 3, 1863, by 12 Stat. 765
Wilmot	PA	1863–1868
Milligan	TN	1868–1874
Richardson	MA	1874–1885
J. Davis	DC	1885–1902
Wright	IL	1903–1905
Booth	IL	1905–1928
Sinnott	OR	1928–1929
Williams	IL	1929–1940
Jones	TX	1940–1947
Howell	IL	1947–1948
Redesignated as Associate Judge of the United States Court of Claims on September 1, 1948, by 62 Stat. 898
Howell	IL	1948–1953
Laramore	IN	1954–1972
Kunzig	PA	1972–1982
Reassigned to United States Court of Appeals for the Federal Circuit on October 1, 1982, by 96 Stat. 25

Seat 5
Established as Judge of the Court of Claims on March 3, 1863, by 12 Stat. 765
Peck	IL	1863–1878
Hunt	LA	1878–1881
Scofield	PA	1881–1891
Peelle	IN	1892–1906
Barney	WI	1905–1919
Graham	PA	1919–1930
Whaley	SC	1930–1939
Whitaker	TN	1939–1948
Redesignated as Associate Judge of the United States Court of Claims on September 1, 1948, by 62 Stat. 898
Whitaker	TN	1948–1964
Collins	DC	1964–1972
Bennett	MD	1972–1982
Reassigned to United States Court of Appeals for the Federal Circuit on October 1, 1982, by 96 Stat. 25

Seat 6
Established as Associate Judge of the United States Court of Claims on May 11, 1966, by 80 Stat. 139
Nichols Jr.	MA	1966–1982
Reassigned to United States Court of Appeals for the Federal Circuit on October 1, 1982, by 96 Stat. 25

Seat 7
Established as Associate Judge of the United States Court of Claims on May 11, 1966, by 80 Stat. 139
Skelton	TX	1966–1977
Smith	MD	1978–1982
Reassigned to United States Court of Appeals for the Federal Circuit on October 1, 1982, by 96 Stat. 25
