= Peter F. Mack Jr. =

American politician (1916–1986)

Peter Francis Mack Jr.
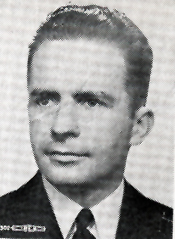

Member of the U.S. House of Representatives from Illinois's 21st district
- In office January 3, 1949 – January 3, 1963
- Preceded by: George E. Howell
- Succeeded by: Paul Findley (redistricting)

Personal details
- Born: November 1, 1916 Carlinville, Illinois, U.S.
- Died: July 4, 1986 (aged 69) Rockville, Maryland, U.S.
- Resting place: Arlington National Cemetery
- Party: Democratic

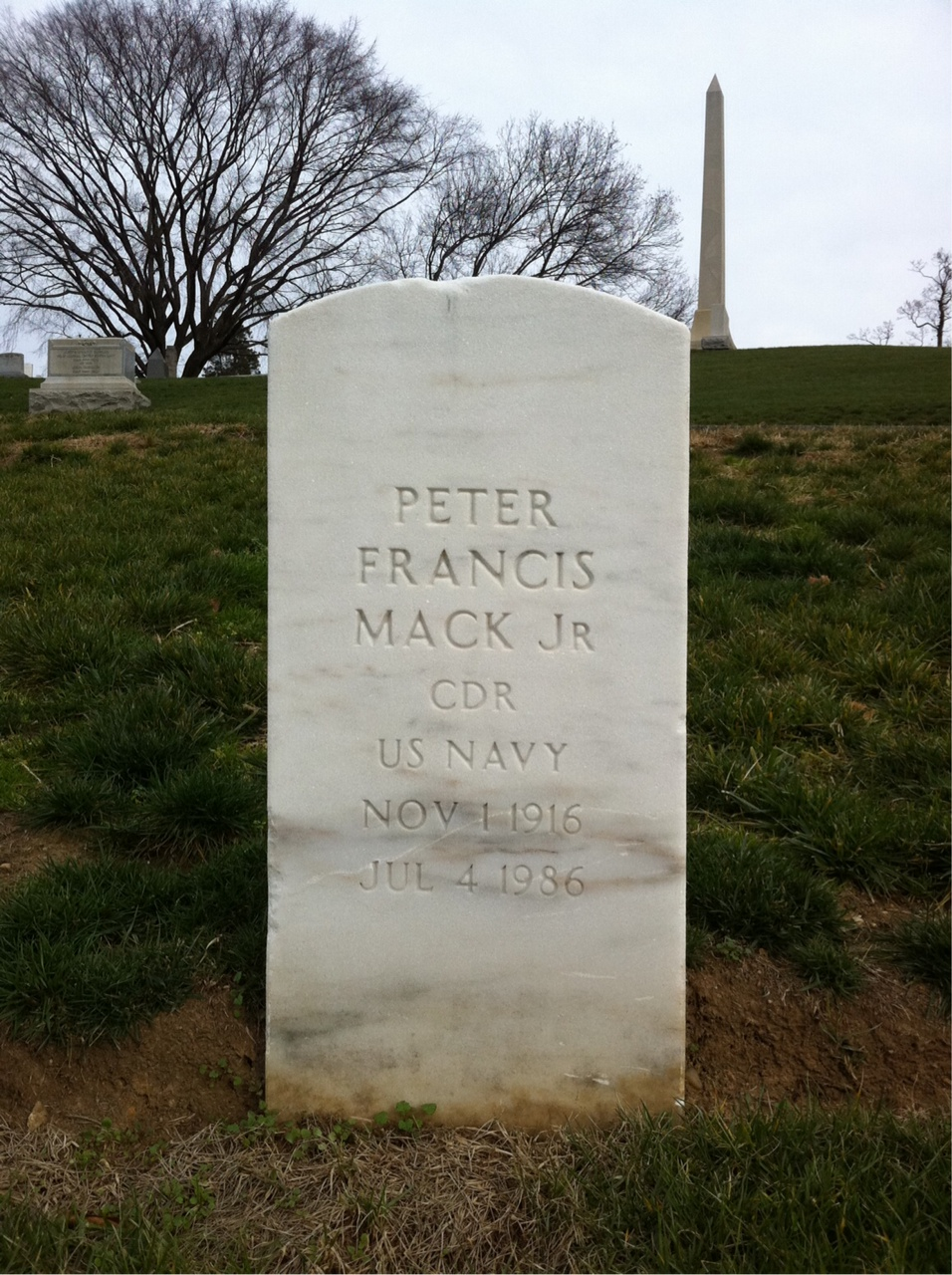
Grave at Arlington National Cemetery

Peter Francis Mack Jr. (November 1, 1916 – July 4, 1986) was a U.S. Representative from Illinois.

== Early life ==
Born in Carlinville, Illinois, Mack attended the public schools. At a young age he worked in coal mines in the area and in his family's business--the local Ford auto dealership. He attended Blackburn College in Carlinville and St. Louis (Missouri) University. Mack took special courses in aviation at Springfield Junior College and St. Louis University. He was engaged in his family's automotive sales and service business in Carlinville, Illinois. He was also a licensed commercial pilot. He enlisted in United States Navy in 1942 and served four years in naval air force and later served as a Naval Reserve officer with rank of commander. He was nicknamed Illinois's "Flying Congressman" after piloting the single-engine Beechcraft Bonanza "Friendship Flame" on a circumnavigational solo flight in 1951 on a good will tour. He had flown 33,000 miles, visited 35 countries and 45 cities, logging 210 hours in the air.

== Congressional career ==
Mack was elected as a Democrat to the Eighty-first and to the six succeeding Congresses (January 3, 1949 – January 3, 1963). In the 1961 decennial reapportionment, Mack was drawn into Illinois's 20th congressional district with Republican Congressman Paul Findley. While Mack was widely viewed as the favorite, Findley defeated Mack in the 1962 general election. Mack was also an unsuccessful candidate for election in 1974 and in 1976 to the Ninety-fourth and Ninety-fifth Congresses.

While in Congress, Mack was a member of the House Commerce Committee and served as chairman of its Commerce and Finance Subcommittee. In 1958, after a series of lurid magazine articles and Hollywood films denouncing the switchblade knife as an accessory of youth gang culture, Mack sponsored legislation to make automatic-opening or switchblade knives illegal to purchase, sell, or import in interstate commerce, which was enacted into law as the Switchblade Knife Act of 1958. Mack and other congressmen supporting the legislation believed that by stopping the importation and interstate sales of automatic knives (effectively halting sales of new switchblades), the law would reduce youth gang violence by blocking access to what had become a symbolic weapon. However, while switchblade imports and sales to lawful owners soon ended, later legislative research demonstrated that youth gang violence rates had in fact rapidly increased, as gang members turned to firearms instead of knives.

== Later career ==
Mack served as assistant to the president of Southern Railway from 1963 to 1975, and owned and operated the Peter Mack Company, a real estate and investment firm. In 1976, Mack attempted a political comeback running against Findley. Findley defeated Mack with 63.6% of the vote to Mack's 36.4% of the vote. He was a resident of Potomac, Maryland, until his death in Rockville, Maryland on July 4, 1986. Mack was interred in Arlington National Cemetery.

== Notes ==
U.S. House of Representatives
Preceded by George E. Howell	Member of the U.S. House of Representatives from Illinois's 21st congressional district 1949–1963	Succeeded by Kenneth J. Gray
