= James Gamble (politician) =

American politician (1809–1883)

Member of the U.S. House of Representatives from Pennsylvania
- In office March 4, 1851 – March 3, 1855
- Preceded by: Joseph Casey
- Succeeded by: John Jamison Pearce
- Constituency: 13th district (1851–1853); 15th district (1853–1855)

Member of the Pennsylvania House of Representatives
- In office 1841-1842

Personal details
- Born: January 28, 1809 Jersey Shore, Pennsylvania, U.S.
- Died: February 22, 1883 (aged 74) Williamsport, Pennsylvania, U.S.
- Resting place: Wildwood Cemetery
- Party: Democratic

James Gamble (January 28, 1809 – February 22, 1883) was an American lawyer and politician who served as a Democratic member of the U.S. House of Representatives from Pennsylvania. He served two consecutive terms representing two different districts from 1851 to 1855.

== Biography ==
James Gamble was born in Jersey Shore, Pennsylvania. He attended the common schools and Jersey Shore Academy. He studied law, was admitted to the bar in December 1833 and commenced practice in Jersey Shore.

=== Early career ===
He was treasurer of Lycoming County, Pennsylvania from 1834 to 1836. He resumed the practice of law in Jersey Shore, and served as a member of the Pennsylvania House of Representatives in 1841 and 1842.

=== Congress ===
Gamble was elected as a Democrat to the Thirty-second and Thirty-third Congresses.

=== Later career ===
He served as president judge of Clearfield County, Pennsylvania, in 1859 and 1860, and president judge of the court of common pleas of Lycoming County from 1868 to 1878.

== Death and burial ==
He died in Williamsport, Pennsylvania, in 1883. His remains were interred in Wildwood Cemetery.

== Sources ==
- United States Congress. "James Gamble (id: G000029)". Biographical Directory of the United States Congress.
- The Political Graveyard

U.S. House of Representatives
Preceded by Joseph Casey	Member of the U.S. House of Representatives from Pennsylvania's 13th congressional district 1851–1853	Succeeded by Asa Packer
Preceded by William H. Kurtz	Member of the U.S. House of Representatives from Pennsylvania's 15th congressional district 1853–1855	Succeeded by John J. Pearce
