= Samuel Jordan Graham =

American judge (1859–1951)

Samuel Jordhan Graham
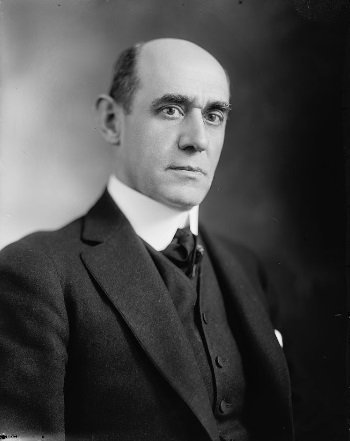
- Harris & Ewing photo, circa 1919.

Senior Judge of the Court of Claims
- In office May 1, 1930 – January 20, 1951

Judge of the Court of Claims
- In office July 28, 1919 – May 1, 1930
- Appointed by: Woodrow Wilson
- Preceded by: Samuel S. Barney
- Succeeded by: Richard S. Whaley

Personal details
- Born: Samuel Jordan Graham; July 27, 1859 Lexington, Virginia, US
- Died: January 20, 1951 (aged 91) Roanoke, Virginia, US
- Education: Washington and Lee University; Washington and Lee University School of Law

Samuel Jordan Graham (July 27, 1859 – January 20, 1951) was a judge of the Court of Claims.

== Education and career ==
Born in Lexington, Virginia, Graham attended Washington and Lee University and graduated from Washington and Lee University School of Law in 1881. Graham was in private practice in Lexington from 1881 to 1890, and in Pittsburgh, Pennsylvania, from 1890 to 1913. He was a United States Assistant Attorney General from 1913 to 1919.

== Federal judicial service ==
Graham was nominated by President Woodrow Wilson on July 10, 1919, to a seat on the Court of Claims (later the United States Court of Claims) vacated by Judge Samuel S. Barney. He was confirmed by the United States Senate on July 28, 1919, and received his commission the same day. He assumed senior status on May 1, 1930. His service terminated on January 20, 1951, due to his death in Roanoke, Virginia.

== Sources ==
- "Graham, Samuel Jordan - Federal Judicial Center". www.fjc.gov.

Legal offices
Preceded by Samuel S. Barney	Judge of the Court of Claims; 1919–1930	Succeeded by Richard S. Whaley
