= John Jamison Pearce =

American politician (1826–1912)

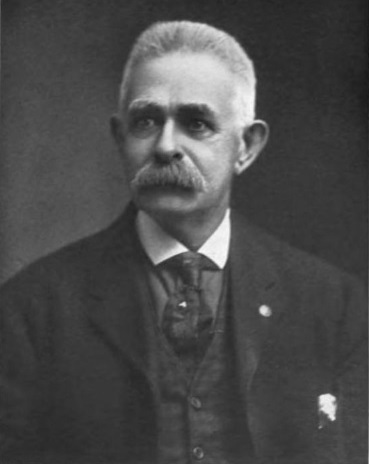
From Volume II (1910) of History of the Western Reserve

John Jamison Pearce (February 28, 1826 – May 26, 1912) was a Republican member of the U.S. House of Representatives from Pennsylvania.

John J. Pearce was born in Wilkes-Barre, Pennsylvania. He completed preparatory studies and was ordained a minister in the Methodist Episcopal Church when eighteen years of age. He joined the Baltimore Conference and served as pastor at Warriors Mark, Jersey Shore, and Lock Haven, Pennsylvania.

Pearce was elected as a Whig candidate to the Thirty-fourth Congress. He declined to be a candidate for reelection in 1856. He served as a pastor in various localities until he retired to Lock Haven in 1888. He moved to Conneaut, Ohio, where he died in 1912. Interment in Highland Cemetery in Lock Haven, Pennsylvania.

== Sources ==
- United States Congress. "John Jamison Pearce (id: P000162)". Biographical Directory of the United States Congress.
- The Political Graveyard

U.S. House of Representatives
Preceded by James Gamble	Member of the U.S. House of Representatives from Pennsylvania's 15th congressional district 1855–1857	Succeeded by Allison White
