= Logan Morris (judge) =

American judge (1889–1977)

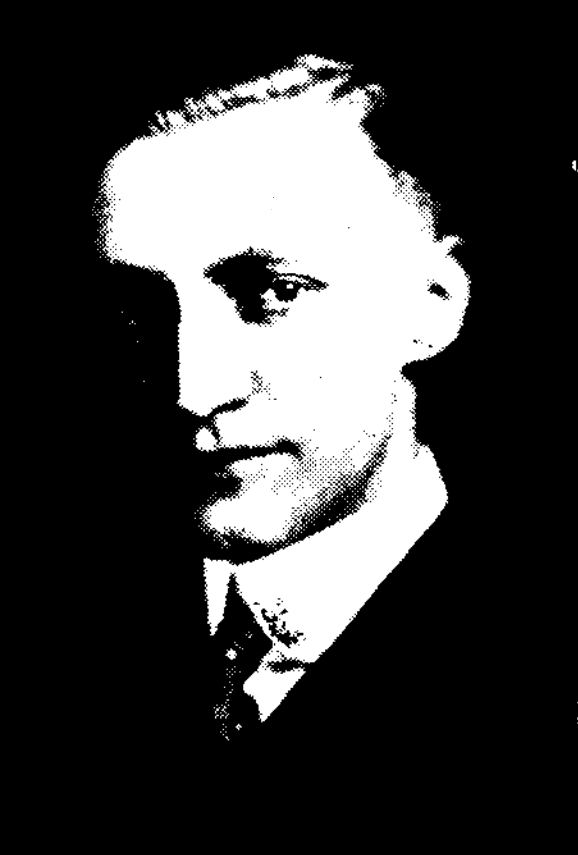
Logan Morris in 1926

Logan Meyer Morris (October 25, 1889 – October 20, 1977) was a judge of the United States Board of Tax Appeals (later the United States Tax Court) from 1925 to 1937.

Born in Logan, Utah, Morris received a bachelor's degree from the University of Utah in 1910. He was a Mormon missionary in Switzerland and Germany from 1911 to 1913, and then served as secretary to Senator Reed Smoot, moving to Washington, D.C., for that purpose in 1914, and receiving his law degree from the George Washington University in 1917. He served as an officer in the United States Army in World War I. Returning from the war, he was a clerk for the United States Senate Committee on Public Lands, and an attorney for various government agencies.

In 1921, President Warren G. Harding appointed Morris as a special attorney for the Bureau of Internal Revenue, and in 1925, President Calvin Coolidge appointed Morris to the newly formed Board of Tax Appeals. Morris served in that body for 12 years, including a four-year term as chief judge. Morris resigned from the Board of Tax Appeals in 1937 to enter private practice, and was succeeded by Clarence V. Opper.

Morris retired from the practice of law in 1963, and died 14 years later, at Washington Hospital Center, at the age of 88.
