= Marion T. Bennett =

American judge (1914–2000)

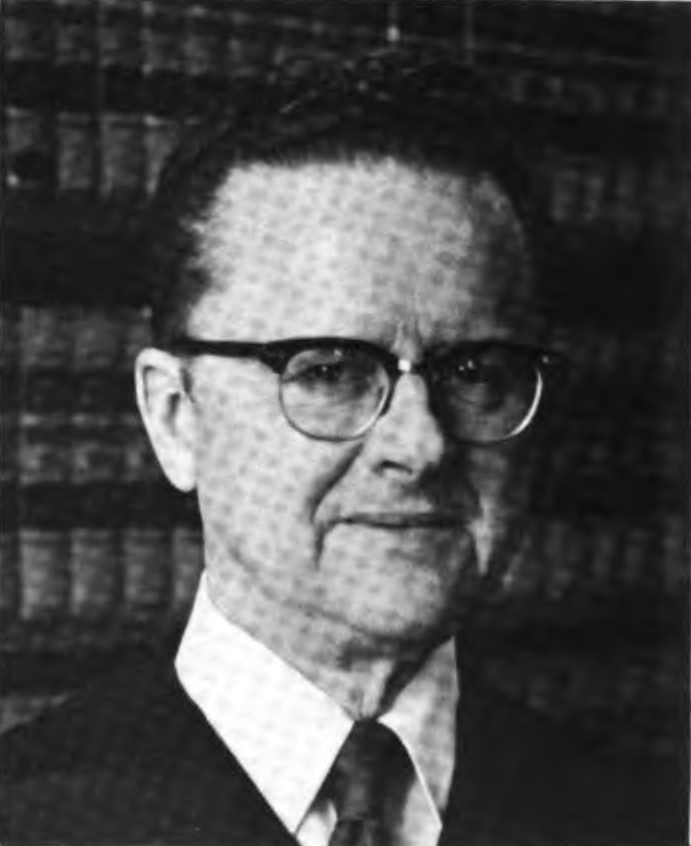
- Bennett in 1990. Collection of US House of Representatives.

Senior Judge of the United States Court of Appeals for the Federal Circuit
- In office March 1, 1986 – September 6, 2000

Judge of the United States Court of Appeals for the Federal Circuit
- In office October 1, 1982 – March 1, 1986
- Appointed by: operation of law
- Preceded by: Seat established by 96 Stat. 25
- Succeeded by: Haldane Robert Mayer

Judge of the United States Court of Claims
- In office June 28, 1972 – October 1, 1982
- Appointed by: Richard Nixon
- Preceded by: Linton McGee Collins
- Succeeded by: Seat abolished

Member of the U.S. House of Representatives from Missouri's 6th district
- In office January 12, 1943 – January 3, 1949
- Preceded by: Philip Allen Bennett
- Succeeded by: George H. Christopher

Personal details
- Born: Marion Tinsley Bennett; June 6, 1914 Buffalo, Missouri, U.S.
- Died: September 6, 2000 (aged 86) Alexandria, Virginia, U.S.
- Party: Republican
- Education: Missouri State University (AB); Washington University in St. Louis (JD)

Marion Tinsley Bennett (June 6, 1914 – September 6, 2000) served as a member of the United States Congress, as a judge of the United States Court of Claims and as a United States circuit judge of the United States Court of Appeals for the Federal Circuit.

== Education and career ==
Born in Buffalo, Missouri on June 6, 1914, to Philip Allen Bennett and Mary Bertha (Tinsley) Bennett, he received his Artium Baccalaureus degree from Southwest Missouri State College (now Missouri State University) in 1935 and earned a Juris Doctor from Washington University School of Law in 1938, after which he entered private practice. While practicing law, he was elected to the Greene County, Missouri Republican Central Committee, and managed his father's two Congressional election campaigns. Additionally, in 1950 he became a United States Air Force Reserve Colonel, a position he held until 1974.

=== Personal ===
In 1941 he married June Young of Hurley Missouri; they had two children, Ann and William, plus 4 grandchildren.

== Congressman ==
When his father died in office on December 7, 1942; Bennett was chosen in a special election to complete his father's term in the 78th Congress. He was 28 years old. Winning reelection twice, he served in the 79th and 80th Congresses.

=== Tour of German concentration camps ===
Bennett was part of an official ten-member Congressional delegation invited by General Dwight D. Eisenhower to follow the United States Third Army into Buchenwald concentration camp near Weimar, Germany in 1945. The delegation's members toured the United States speaking and reporting on what they had seen of the horrific conditions in the camp. Bennett is quoted in the New York Times on May 6, 1945, "I left Buchenwald convinced that every German must be killed."

== Federal judicial service ==
Following the end of his Congressional service, Bennett was appointed as a Trial Judge (Commissioner) of the United States Court of Claims, in which position he served from 1949 to 1972. He served as Chief of the Trial Division of the Court of Claims from 1964 to 1972.

Bennett was nominated by President Richard Nixon on May 22, 1972, to a seat on the United States Court of Claims vacated by Judge Linton McGee Collins. He was confirmed by the United States Senate on June 28, 1972, and received his commission on June 28, 1972. He was reassigned by operation of law on October 1, 1982, to the United States Court of Appeals for the Federal Circuit, to a new seat authorized by 96 Stat. 25. He assumed senior status on March 1, 1986, and took inactive senior status in 1997. His service terminated on September 6, 2000, due to his death.

== Death and burial ==
Bennett died in Alexandria, Virginia, on September 6, 2000, and is buried at Hazelwood Cemetery in Springfield, Missouri.

== Bibliography ==
- American immigration policies : a history by Marion T. Bennett. Washington: Public Affairs Press, c1963.
- Private claims act and congressional references [by Marion T. Bennett]. Washington: U.S. Govt. Print. Off., 1968.
- The United States Court of Claims: a history, pt. 1. The judges, 1855-1976, by Marion T. Bennett / pt. 2. Origin, development, jurisdiction, 1855-1978, W. Cowen, P. Nichols, M.T. Bennett. Washington, D.C.: Committee on the Bicentennial of Independence and the Constitution of the Judicial Conference of the United States, 1976 i.e. 1977-1978. 2 vol.

U.S. House of Representatives
| Preceded by Philip Allen Bennett | Member of the U.S. House of Representatives from Missouri's 6th congressional district 1943–1949 | Succeeded by George H. Christopher |
Legal offices
| Preceded by Linton McGee Collins | Judge of the United States Court of Claims; 1972–1982 | Succeeded by Seat abolished |
| Preceded by Seat established by 96 Stat. 25 | Judge of the United States Court of Appeals for the Federal Circuit; 1982–1986 | Succeeded by Haldane Robert Mayer |
