= Fonar Corp. v. General Electric Co. =

- Court: United States Court of Appeals for the Federal Circuit
- Full case name: Fonar Corp. v. General Electric Co.
- Decided: February 25, 1997
- Citations: 107 F.3d 1543; 41 U.S.P.Q.2d 1801

Case history
- Prior history: 902 F. Supp. 330 (E.D.N.Y. 1995)
- Subsequent history: Rehearing en banc denied, May 8, 1997

Court membership
- Judges sitting: Alan David Lourie, Byron George Skelton, Randall Ray Rader

Case opinions
- Majority: Lourie, joined by a unanimous panel

Fonar Corp. v. General Electric Co., 107 F.3d 1543 (Fed. Cir. 1997), was a case decided in 1997 by the United States Court of Appeals for the Federal Circuit concerning source code and the disclosure requirement for software patents.

== Case details ==
=== Factual background ===
Fonar was a dispute between medical device manufacturer Fonar Corporation and General Electric over Fonar's patent on MRI technology. Fonar's founder, Raymond Damadian, was issued U.S. Patent 3,789,832 (priority date 1972-03-17) for an "apparatus and method for detecting cancer in tissue" using the magnetic resonance of atoms. Damadian's patent was the first patent on an MRI machine issued in the United States. Also at issue was a later patent, U.S. Patent 4,871,966 issued in 1989, covering a method for obtaining MRI images of multiple planes at different orientations in a single scan. GE is a major manufacturer of MRI scanners, and Fonar sued GE for infringing these patents by producing its scanners as well as inducing others to infringe.

=== Procedural history ===
A jury in the United States District Court for the Eastern District of New York found that GE infringed patent 4,871,966 and awarded Fonar $110.5 million in damages (reduced on appeal to $103.4 million). GE appealed this verdict to the Federal Circuit. The District Court also granted GE's motion for judgment as a matter of law (JMOL) that GE did not infringe patent 3,789,832, which Fonar cross-appealed to the Federal Circuit as well.

The Federal Circuit found for Fonar on both issues, upholding the jury's verdict and reversing the JMOL concerning patent 3,789,832. GE appealed to the United States Supreme Court, which denied certiorari. GE ultimately paid Fonar over $120 million in damages plus interest.

=== Issues ===
The core of GE's defense rest on its claim that Fonar failed to meet the best mode requirement in disclosing patent 4,871,966 because it failed to disclose the source code to two critical software routines. Fonar countered by arguing that its description of the function of the routines was sufficient disclosure and that source code was unnecessary to fulfill the best mode requirement.

=== Holding ===
The court held that software patents generally do not need to include source code to satisfy the best mode requirement if the function of the software can be described by other means.

== Importance ==
Fonar represents a continuation of a line of Federal Circuit cases, particularly In re Sherwood and In re Hayes, holding that source code disclosure is not required for software patents. Fonar reiterated the doctrine from Sherwood and Hayes very clearly and emphasized the Federal Circuit's preference for a description of a software's function over the software's actual source code.
