= Akamai Technologies, Inc. v. Limelight Networks, Inc. =

Akamai Technologies, Inc. v. Limelight Networks, Inc., 797 F.3d 1020 (Fed. Cir. 2015), is a 2015 en banc decision of the United States Court of Appeals for the Federal Circuit, on remand from a 2014 decision of the U.S. Supreme Court reversing a previous Federal Circuit decision in the case. This is the most recent in a string of decisions in the case that concern the proper legal standard for determining patent infringement liability when multiple actors are involved in carrying out the claimed infringement of a method patent and no single accused infringer has performed all of the steps (so-called divided infringement). In the 2015 remand decision, the Federal Circuit expanded the scope of vicarious liability in such cases, holding that one actor could be held liable for the acts of another actor "when an alleged infringer conditions participation in an activity or receipt of a benefit upon performance of a step or steps of a patented method and establishes the manner or timing of that performance." In addition, the court held that where multiple "actors form a joint enterprise, all can be charged with the acts of the other[s], rendering each liable for the steps performed by the other[s] as if each is a single actor."

== Background ==
=== The invention ===
The named inventors in U.S. Pat. No. 6,108,703 are Professor Tom Leighton of the Massachusetts Institute of Technology (MIT) and his student Danny Lewin (now deceased), a PhD candidate at MIT. They assigned their rights in the patent to MIT, which granted an exclusive license to Akamai Technologies, Inc., a company that the inventors formed in 1998.

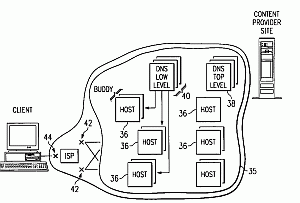
Drawing of the patented system involved in Akamai v. Limelight

The patent claims a method of delivering electronic data using a “content delivery network,” or “CDN.” Proprietors of Internet Web sites, known as “content providers,” contract with Akamai to deliver their Web sites’ content to individual Internet users. The patent provides for the designation of certain components of a content provider's Web site (often large files, such as video or music files) to be stored on Akamai's servers and accessed from those servers by Internet users. The process of designating Web site components to be stored on Akamai's servers is known as “tagging.” By aggregating the data demands of multiple content providers with differing peak usage patterns and serving that content from multiple servers in multiple locations, Akamai is able to increase the speed with which Internet users access the content from Web sites.

The relevant claim of the patent provides as follows, where the italicized step can be performed by the customer rather than by the CDN operator (as it was by the defendant's customers involved in the lawsuit):

34. A content delivery method, comprising:

distributing a set of page objects across a network of content servers managed by a domain other than a content provider domain, wherein the network of content servers are organized into a set of regions;

for a given page normally served from the content provider domain, tagging at least some of the embedded objects of the page so that requests for the objects resolve to the domain instead of the content provider domain;

in response to a client request for an embedded object of the page:

resolving the client request as a function of a location of the client machine making the request and current Internet traffic conditions to identify a given region; and

returning to the client an IP address of a given one of the content servers within the given region that is likely to host the embedded object and that is not overloaded.

=== The conduct of Limelight ===
Limelight Networks, Inc., also operates a CDN and carries out several of the steps claimed in the patent. But instead of tagging those components of its customers’ Web sites that it intends to store on its servers (a step included in the asserted claim of the patent), Limelight requires its customers to do their own tagging. Akamai and MIT claim that Limelight “provides instructions and offers technical assistance” to its customers regarding how to tag, but the record is undisputed that Limelight does not itself tag the components to be stored on its servers. (See italicized part of claim 34, above.)

== Prior history ==
In 2006, Akamai and MIT sued Limelight in the United States District Court for the District of Massachusetts, claiming patent infringement. The case was tried to a jury, which found that Limelight infringed the patent and it found Limelight liable for more than $40 million.

But while the case was still pending, the Federal Circuit decided a case in which it held that to find direct infringement a single party must perform every step of a claimed method or else must exercise "control or direction" over the entire process so that "every step is attributable to the controlling party." Limelight therefore moved that the court grant it judgment as a matter of law (JMOL), and the court agreed with it, because infringement of MIT's patent required tagging and Limelight did not control or direct its customers’ tagging.

=== 2012 Federal Circuit ruling ===
A panel of the Federal Circuit affirmed the JMOL, explaining that a defendant that does not itself perform all of a patent's steps can be liable for direct infringement only when there is an agency relationship between the parties who perform the other method steps or when one party is contractually obligated to the other to perform the steps.

But the Federal Circuit then granted en banc review and reversed. The en banc court found it unnecessary to consider direct infringement under 35 U.S.C. § 271(a) because it concluded that the evidence could support a judgment in Akamai's favor on a theory of induced infringement under 35 U.S.C. § 271(b).

=== Supreme Court ===
Limelight Networks, Inc. v. Akamai Technologies, Inc.
- Supreme Court of the United States

Argued April 30, 2014 Decided June 2, 2014
- Full case name: Limelight Networks, Inc. v. Akamai Technologies, Inc., et al.
- Docket no.: 12-786
- Citations: 572 U.S. 915 (more) 134 S. Ct. 2111; 189 L. Ed. 2d 52; 110 U.S.P.Q.2d 1681

Case history
- Prior: Claims construed, No. 1:06-cv-11109, 494 F. Supp. 2d 34 (D. Mass. 2007); judgment as a matter of law granted, 614 F. Supp. 2d 90 (D. Mass. 2009); affirmed, 629 F.3d 1311 (Fed. Cir. 2010); reversed on rehearing en banc, 692 F.3d 1301 (Fed. Cir. 2012); cert. granted, 571 U.S. 1118 (2014).

Holding
- Induced patent infringement cannot occur without direct infringement.

Court membership
- Chief Justice John Roberts Associate Justices Antonin Scalia · Anthony Kennedy; Clarence Thomas · Ruth Bader Ginsburg; Stephen Breyer · Samuel Alito; Sonia Sotomayor · Elena Kagan

Case opinion
- Majority: Alito, joined by unanimous

Limelight sought review in the Supreme Court, which reversed. It held that induced infringement cannot occur without direct infringement. The Supreme Court said, "The Federal Circuit’s analysis fundamentally misunderstands what it means to infringe a method patent." The Court insisted that Akamai's view "would deprive § 271(b) of ascertainable standards." The Court explained:

If a defendant can be held liable under § 271(b) for inducing conduct that does not constitute infringement, then how can a court assess when a patent holder’s rights have been invaded? What if a defendant pays another to perform just one step of a 12-step process, and no one performs the other steps, but that one step can be viewed as the most important step in the process? In that case the defendant has not encouraged infringement, but no principled reason prevents him from being held liable for inducement under the Federal Circuit’s reasoning, which permits inducement liability when fewer than all of a method’s steps have been performed within the meaning of the patent. The decision below would require the courts to develop two parallel bodies of infringement law: one for liability for direct infringement, and one for liability for inducement.

In the course of its ruling, the Supreme Court stated:

Assuming without deciding that the Federal Circuit's holding in Muniauction is correct, there has simply been no infringement of the method in which respondents have staked out an interest, because the performance of all the patent's steps is not attributable to any one person. And, as both the Federal Circuit and respondents admit, where there has been no direct infringement, there can be no inducement of infringement under § 271(b). [...] [I]n this case, performance of all the claimed steps cannot be attributed to a single person, so direct infringement never occurred. Limelight cannot be liable for inducing infringement that never came to pass.

The Court added that "on remand, the Federal Circuit will have the opportunity to revisit the § 271(a) question if it so chooses."

=== Remand ===
After the 2014 Supreme Court reversal, the case returned to the Federal Circuit. In May 2015, a panel of the Federal Circuit once again addressed the jury verdict and found that Limelight is not liable for direct infringement. The court (2-1) reiterated the prior Federal Circuit rule as to divided infringement: there must be "a principal-agent relationship, a contractual relationship, or in circumstances in which parties work together in a joint enterprise functioning as a form of mutual agency." One judge dissented, arguing that the majority ruling "divorces patent law from mainstream legal principles by refusing to accept that § 271(a) includes joint tortfeasor liability" and it "creates a gaping hole in what for centuries has been recognized as an actionable form of infringement."

A panel of the Federal Circuit does not have the authority to overrule prior Federal Circuit law. For the court to overrule its prior case law, it must operate en banc. In this case, after the panel decision was rendered, the Federal Circuit vacated the panel decision and set the case for rehearing en banc.

== 2015 Federal Circuit ruling ==
Akamai Technologies, Inc. v. Limelight Networks, Inc.
- Court: United States Court of Appeals for the Federal Circuit
- Full case name: Akamai Technologies, Inc., The Massachusetts Institute of Technology v. Limelight Networks, Inc.
- Decided: August 13, 2015
- Citations: 797 F.3d 1020; 116 U.S.P.Q.2d 1344

Case history
- Subsequent history: Remanded, 805 F.3d 1368 (Fed. Cir. 2015); cert. denied, 136 S. Ct. 1661 (2016).

Court membership
- Judges sitting: Sharon Prost, Pauline Newman, Alan David Lourie, Richard Linn, Timothy B. Dyk, Kimberly Ann Moore, Kathleen M. O'Malley, Jimmie V. Reyna, Evan Wallach, Todd M. Hughes

Case opinions
- Per curiam

The en banc court characterized the problem as determining, when "more than one actor is involved in practicing the steps" of a method claim of a patent, whether the acts of one actor are attributable to the other actor such that second one is to be held "responsible for the infringement." The court said that it would hold one entity responsible for another's performance of method steps in two sets of circumstances:

1. "where that entity directs or controls others' performance", or
2. "where the actors form a joint enterprise."

In past cases, the court noted that it had held that "an actor is liable for infringement under § 271(a) if it acts through an agent (applying traditional agency principles) or contracts with another to perform one or more steps of a claimed method." To those two circumstances, the court held that it would now add a third:

We conclude, on the facts of this case, that liability under § 271(a) can also be found when an alleged infringer conditions participation in an activity or receipt of a benefit upon performance of a step or steps of a patented method and establishes the manner or timing of that performance.

The court noted that this is copyright law's "vicarious liability" rule as stated in Metro-Goldwyn-Mayer Studios Inc. v. Grokster, Ltd. Further, "Whether a single actor directed or controlled the acts of one or more third parties is a question of fact, reviewable on appeal for substantial evidence, when tried to a jury."

As for the joint enterprise basis for liability, the court instructed that it would follow the rule of the Restatement (Second) of Torts § 491 cmt. b: "The law [...] considers that each is the agent or servant of the others, and that the act of any one within the scope of the enterprise is to be charged vicariously against the rest." This in turn calls for proof of four elements:

(1) an agreement, express or implied, among the members of the group;

(2) a common purpose to be carried out by the group;

(3) a community of pecuniary interest in that purpose, among the members; and

(4) an equal right to a voice in the direction of the enterprise, which gives an equal right of control.

This too raises a question of fact, reviewable on appeal for substantial evidence, when tried to a jury.

Turning to the facts of the specific case before it, the court reversed the JMOL and reinstated the jury verdict. The court said that the jury had heard substantial evidence from which it could find that Limelight directed or controlled its customers' performance of each remaining method step that Limelight did not itself perform. such that all steps of the method are attributable to Limelight. For example, "Akamai presented substantial evidence demonstrating that Limelight conditions its customers' use of its content delivery network upon its customers' performance of" the "tagging" and "serving" steps of the patented process, and that "Limelight establishes the manner or timing of its customers' performance." The form contract that Limelight uses provides for the customer to do acts amounting to tagging and serving.

After further proceedings, the Federal Circuit remanded the case to the district court, for it to reinstate the 2008 jury verdict of infringement and the $40 million plus lost profits award. Limelight announced its intention to appeal the judgment to the U.S. Supreme Court, and on January 26, 2016, filed a certiorari petition. The question presented is:

Whether the Federal Circuit erred in holding that a defendant may be held liable for directly infringing a method patent based on the collective performance of method steps by multiple independent parties, even though the performance of all the steps of the method patent is “not attributable to any one person” under traditional vicarious-liability standards.

The Supreme Court denied certiorari on April 18, 2016.

== The Massachusetts District Court's July 2016 final ruling ==
On July 1, 2016, it was announced that the Massachusetts District Court entered the final judgment in the case, with Limelight paying $51M in total damages to Akamai (to be reflected in Limelight's 2016 Q2 earnings).

== Commentary ==
- Professor Michael Dzwonczyk wrote that Akamai's patent claim "could easily have been rewritten as a single-actor method claim that would not require the performance of any step by a second actor," and provided a rewritten version.
- Harold Wegner also analyzed the patent-claim "wordsmithing" and showed how the litigation problem could have been avoided.
- Professor Jason Rantanen pointed out an odd quirk in the new doctrine. He observes in the Patently-O blog that "a party could be liable for inducement where it induced another party who itself performed some of the steps and the remaining steps were attributable to the induced party (even if performed by another [third party]).
- The PCK blog asserted:

After this case, it will be more difficult to avoid patent infringement by simply delegating some of the steps in the process to another party. This includes directing your own customers commit a portion of the infringement for you, even if you have not agreed to indemnify them legally. In light of this, companies who work collaboratively on large projects should be mindful not only of their own role in a potentially patent-infringing process, but the roles of every other party involved.

- The Marathon Blog observes that the court's ruling that divided infringement now constitutes direct infringement, not induced or contributory infringement, makes litigation easier for patentees "since direct infringement does not have to meet the 'knowledge' and 'intent' requirements (as in induced infringement)."
- The University of Minnesota's Lawsciblog (Minn. J.L. Sci. & Tech.) opined that the case was important in providing a way for patentees to prevent "a possible way to dodge the direct infringement liability by inducing the consumers to perform some of actions of infringement." That is, the consumers could be held to be in a joint enterprise with the primary infringer, such as the party in Limelight's position.
- Beverly E Hjorth argues that the new divided-infringement rule of the Akamai case can usefully be asserted in the medical diagnostic field:

For example, a company may own a patent that covers a diagnostic method having steps that could be practiced by two entities, a physician and a laboratory. This could be of concern to a competitor laboratory that provides diagnostic kits to medical facilities with instructions to collect and send a sample to the laboratory.

Although Hjorth does not mention it, this is precisely the kind of patent unsuccessfully asserted in the Supreme Court's 2012 Mayo decision. Moreover, the asserted claim in that case suffered from the very defect that the Federal Circuit's en banc Akamai decision seeks to remedy. Perhaps the claim asserted in the Mayo case could be considered a joint-enterprise claim under Akamai.

- Professor John Golden, writing in the New Private Law Blog, sees the case as presenting "a fundamental dilemma":

Should the courts understand the scope of patent infringement to permit patentees to prevent or “tax” multi-party activities that arguably lie beyond any clear notice provided by the Patent Act, its legislative history, or judicial precedent? Alternatively, by understanding patent infringement more restrictively, should courts effectively sanction “avoision” behavior [combining aspects of law "evasion" and "avoidance"] that might artificially divide up acts of technological exploitation?

== Subsequent developments ==
=== Lilly v. Teva ===
In Eli Lilly & Co. v. Teva Parenteral Meds., Inc., the district court applied the Akamai ruling to find patent infringement. Lilly owns a patent on methods of administering a chemotherapy drug (brand name Alimta®, generic name pemetrexed disodium), followed or preceded by vitamin B12 and folic acid, which minimize the drug's toxic side effects. The defendants sought approval from the Food and Drug Administration (FDA) to market generic forms of the chemotherapy drug along with instructions to doctors and patients that they should follow or precede the administration of the chemotherapy drug as the patent prescribes. As the court noted, FDA regulations require that the product labeling for a proposed generic version of an existing drug, such as Altima, must instruct physicians to follow exactly the claimed regimen, since the generic drug must be distributed with identical labeling to that for the original drug.

Thus the doctor treating the patient would, in addition to administering the chemotherapy drug, administer the vitamin B12 by injection at times and dosages as specified in the claims of Lilly's patent. However, the patients would obtain the folic acid by prescription written by the physician and take it themselves, according to the physician's instructions. The physician would not himself hand the folic acid to the patient or "physically place the folic acid into the patient's mouth."

The district court stated that "for purposes of this case, the Court must apply this most current articulation of the law of divided infringement as stated by the Federal Circuit in its most recent ruling." The court added that "the factual circumstances are sufficiently analogous to those in Akamai to support a finding of direct infringement by physicians under § 271(a), and thus inducement of infringement by Defendants under § 271(b), under the legal standard recently set forth by the Federal Circuit." The court rejected the defense argument that the patients were intervening agents who kept the process steps from being fully attributable to the doctors:

Defendants, relying upon now overruled case law on divided infringement, argue that the actions of the patient in taking folic acid prior to pemetrexed treatment cannot be attributed to the physician because the physician does not physically place the folic acid into the patients' mouth, and because patients are instructed to obtain folic acid, either by prescription or over the counter, and take it on their own. Although the parties present extensive arguments as to whether this constitutes the physician "administering" the folic acid, whether or not this satisfies the definition of "administer" is not relevant. What is relevant is whether the physician sufficiently directs or controls the acts of the patients in such a manner as to condition participation in an activity or receipt of a benefit—in this case, treatment with pemetrexed in the manner that reduces toxicities—upon the performance of a step of the patented method and establishes the manner and timing of the performance.

Akamai states that "liability under § 271(a) can also be found when an alleged infringer conditions participation in an activity or receipt of a benefit upon performance of a step or steps of a patented method and establishes the manner or timing of that performance." Here, the labeling says:

It is very important to take folic acid [...] during your treatment with ALITMA to lower your chances of harmful side effects. You must start taking 400-1000 micrograms of folic acid every day [...]

Furthermore, the labeling requires instruction that "[i]f the patient fails to carry out this step, he or she would not receive the benefit of the patented method, i.e. a reduction of potentially life-threatening toxicities caused by pemetrexed." And the labeling has the physician tell the patient to take "400 to 1000 micrograms of folic acid for at least five days out of the seven days prior to and during pemetrexed administration—and the patient is required to do so to receive the full benefit of the treatment." This corresponds to what Akamai states is a basis for finding liability. Accordingly, the court found that under Akamai performance of the method steps by the patients would be attributable to the physician and would thus constitute direct infringement by the physician under § 271(a). Thus, use of the defendants’ products, who provided the necessary instructions, would result in the defendants' induced infringement of the physician, under § 271(b).

=== Medgraph v. Medtronic ===
In Medgraph, Inc. v. Medtronic, Inc. the Federal Circuit upheld a district court ruling that the new Akamai standard did not aid the patentee Medgraph in its suit because there was no "showing that Medtronic itself directly infringed the method claims or that it acted as a ‘mastermind’ by controlling or directing anyone else's direct infringement." Medgraph argued that it should prevail under the Federal Circuit's 2015 ruling that infringement could be found "when an alleged infringer conditions participation in an activity or receipt of a benefit upon performance of a step or steps of a patented method and establishes the manner or timing of that performance." But the Federal Circuit ruled that this theory did not apply because Medgraph could not show that the missing steps in its method for a doctor to diagnose a patient were actually performed by the patient and doctor. The accused infringer may have instructed users how to use the invention to infringe the patent, but it did not require that those steps be followed or necessarily receive some benefit upon their performance.

The Federal Circuit said, first, that there was no direct infringement under the new theory:

The evidence presented to the district court indisputably shows that Medtronic does not condition the use of, or receipt of a benefit from, the CareLink System on the performance of all of Medgraph's method steps. For example, Medtronic does not deny users the ability to use CareLink Personal and CareLink Pro without performance of the claim step of ensuring detachment of the measuring device from the patient after each measurement. Nor does it offer an incentive for such detachment. Indeed, the evidence indicates that Medtronic benefits when patients use its continuous glucose monitoring device, which does not involve ensuring detachment after each measurement. The evidence also shows that Medtronic freely permits using the CareLink System without performing synchronization, and it denies no benefit to such users for their choices to do so. Patients can freely choose to bring their devices to their physician's office and have their data extracted locally there.

There was also no indirect infringement, because "indirect infringement is predicated on direct infringement," which was absent here.
