= In re Hayes Microcomputer Products, Inc. Patent Litig. =

Court case

- Court: United States Court of Appeals for the Federal Circuit
- Full case name: In re Hayes Microcomputer Products, Inc. Patent Litigation
- Decided: December 23, 1992
- Citations: 982 F.2d 1527; 61 USLW 2451; 25 U.S.P.Q.2d 1241

Court membership
- Judges sitting: S. Jay Plager, Alan David Lourie, Randall Ray Rader

Case opinions
- Majority: Lourie, joined by a unanimous court

In re Hayes Microcomputer Products, Inc. Patent Litig., 982 F.2d 1527 (Fed. Cir. 1992) was a case decided in 1992 by the United States Court of Appeals for the Federal Circuit, the successor of the United States Court of Customs and Patent Appeals. It concerned, among other things, whether or not the software on a patented device needed to be disclosed in a patent application.

== Case details ==
=== Background ===
In 1985, Dale Heatherington was issued a patent entitled "Modem with Improved Escape Sequence Mechanism to Prevent Escape in Response to Random Occurrence of Escape Character in Transmitted Data," and the patent was assigned to Hayes Microcomputer Products. When other companies began marketing modems that made use of infringing technologies, Hayes asked for licensing fees. The infringing companies then filed suit, claiming that Hayes's patent was invalid because it did not meet the disclosure requirements of 35 U.S.C §112 because the patent did not contain a description of the firmware on the modem.

=== Issues ===
The main issue before the court was whether or not a patent like Hayes's needs to disclose the code for the firmware or software that runs on the invention in order to meet §112's disclosure requirements.

=== Decision ===
The court decided in favor of Hayes. In its decision, it referred to an earlier case, In re Sherwood, in which the court stated that source code disclosure was often not necessary to fulfill §112's disclosure requirement, since the creation of source code is usually within the skill of the art.

== Importance ==
In re Hayes was important primarily because it built upon the precedent set by Sherwood that source code disclosure is often not required.
