= Kara Farnandez Stoll =

American judge (born 1968)

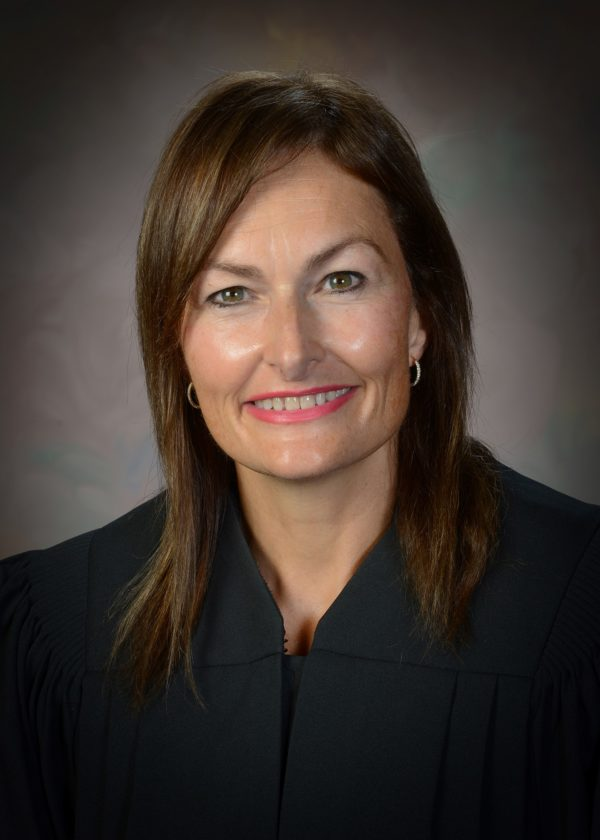
- Farnandez Stoll in 2015

Judge of the United States Court of Appeals for the Federal Circuit
- Incumbent
- Assumed office July 8, 2015
- Appointed by: Barack Obama
- Preceded by: Randall Ray Rader

Personal details
- Born: Kara Ann Farnandez; November 1968 (age 57) Wilmington, Delaware, U.S.
- Education: Michigan State University (BS); Georgetown University (JD)

Kara Ann Farnandez Stoll (born November 1968) is a United States circuit judge of the United States Court of Appeals for the Federal Circuit.

== Biography ==
=== Early life and education ===
Farnandez Stoll received a Bachelor of Science in Electrical Engineering degree, in 1991, from Michigan State University. She worked as a patent examiner at the United States Patent and Trademark Office from 1991 to 1997. She received a Juris Doctor in 1997, from Georgetown University Law Center. From 1997 to 1998, she served as a law clerk to Judge Alvin Anthony Schall of the United States Court of Appeals for the Federal Circuit.

=== Legal career ===
From 1998 to 2015, she worked at the law firm of Finnegan, Henderson, Farabow, Garrett & Dunner and was a partner at that firm. Her practice focused on patent litigation, primarily in the consumer electronics, computers, software and medical device industries. She represented clients at both the trial and appellate levels and served as lead counsel on a number of cases before the United States Court of Appeals for the Federal Circuit. Among her prominent cases, she represented Akamai in en banc rehearing on issues of divided infringement in Akamai Technologies, Inc. v. Limelight Networks, Inc. (Fed. Cir.) and she successfully represented i4i in the largest ($290 million) patent verdict sustained on appeal in i4i Ltd. v. Microsoft (Fed. Cir.). In 2013, she was recognized as a Washington, D.C. "Super Lawyer" in Intellectual Property Litigation by the Super Lawyers Magazine.

She served as an adjunct professor at Howard University School of Law, from 2004 to 2008, and has served as a Distinguished Adjunct Professor at George Mason University Law School, from 2008 to 2015. From 2013 to 2015, she served as co-chair of the Rules Committee of the Federal Circuit Bar Association and served as Vice Chair of that committee, from 2012 to 2013.

== Federal Circuit service ==
On November 12, 2014, President Barack Obama nominated Farnandez Stoll to serve as a United States Circuit Judge of the United States Court of Appeals for the Federal Circuit, to the seat vacated by Judge Randall Ray Rader, who retired on June 30, 2014.

On December 16, 2014, her nomination was returned to the President due to the sine die adjournment of the Senate. On January 7, 2015, President Obama renominated her to the same position. She received a hearing on her nomination on March 11, 2015. On April 23, 2015, her nomination was reported out of committee by a voice vote. On July 7, 2015, the Senate confirmed her by a 95–0 vote. She received her judicial commission on July 8, 2015. She took the oath of office on July 17, 2015.

== Notable opinions ==
Farnandez Stoll authored Advanced Steel Recovery v. X-Body Equipment, 808 F.3d 1313 (Fed. Cir. 2015), which is highly cited for elaborating on the doctrine of equivalents, to include requiring the infringing patented product to "perform in substantially the same way as the claimed invention."

She authored Data Engine Techs. LLC v. Google LLC, 906 F.3d 999 (Fed. Cir. 2018), which affirmed-in-part and reversed-in-part a district court’s holding that claims of several patents are ineligible under 35 U.S.C. § 101, explaining that, when read as a whole, certain of the claims are directed to a specific improved method for navigating through three-dimensional electronic spreadsheets and thus are directed to eligible subject matter, while other claims reciting methods for tracking changes to data in spreadsheets are directed to the abstract idea of collecting, recognizing, and storing changed information.

She authored University of Southern Floridia Research Foundation, Inc. v. Fujifilm Medical Systems U.S.A., Inc., 19 F.4th 1315 (Fed. Cir. 2021), which clarified that under 35 U.S.C. § 281, if a license does not explicitly transfer the right to sue to the licensee, that licensee may not be considered the “patentee” and thus may not have the right to sue on its own without joining the patent owner to a lawsuit.

She authored the majority opinion in LKQ Corp. v. GM Glob. Tech. Operations LLC, 102 F.4th 1280 (Fed. Cir. 2024) (en banc), which changed the obviousness standard for design patents by overruling the prior test and replacing it with the obviousness inquiry used for utility patents.

She authored PowerBlock Holdings, Inc. v. iFit, Inc., 146 F.4th 1366, 1368 (Fed. Cir. 2025), which reversed a district court’s holding that claims for adjustable dumbbells are ineligible under 35 U.S.C. § 101, explaining that the claims are directed to a sufficiently specific mechanical invention and cautioning parties against oversimplifying claims and ignoring limitations recited in the prior art during the eligibility inquiry.

She authored Rex Medical, L.P. v. Intuitive Surgical, Inc., 156 F.4th 1289 (Fed. Cir. 2025), which affirmed a district court’s award of only nominal damages because that the plaintiff’s expert had failed to apportion damages, and the plaintiff did not otherwise provide sufficient evidence to formulate a reasonable royalty.

== See also ==
- List of first women lawyers and judges in Washington D.C.
- List of Hispanic and Latino American jurists

== Sources ==
- Kara Fernandez Stoll at Ballotpedia

Legal offices
Preceded by Randall Ray Rader	Judge of the United States Court of Appeals for the Federal Circuit; 2015–present	Incumbent
