= Giles Rich =

American judge (1904–1999)

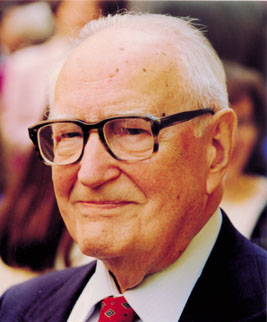

Judge of the United States Court of Appeals for the Federal Circuit
- In office October 1, 1982 – June 9, 1999
- Appointed by: operation of law
- Preceded by: Seat established by 96 Stat. 25
- Succeeded by: Richard Linn

Associate Judge of the United States Court of Customs and Patent Appeals
- In office July 19, 1956 – October 1, 1982
- Appointed by: Dwight D. Eisenhower
- Preceded by: Noble J. Johnson
- Succeeded by: Seat abolished

Personal details
- Born: Giles Sutherland Rich; May 30, 1904 Rochester, New York, U.S.
- Died: June 9, 1999 (aged 95) Washington, D.C., U.S.
- Education: Harvard University (BS); Columbia University (LLB)

Giles Sutherland Rich (May 30, 1904 – June 9, 1999) was an associate judge of the United States Court of Customs and Patent Appeals (CCPA) and later on was a United States Circuit Judge of the United States Court of Appeals for the Federal Circuit (CAFC), and had enormous impact on patent law. He was the first patent attorney appointed to any federal court since Benjamin Robbins Curtis was appointed to the Supreme Court in 1851.

== Early life ==
Rich was born May 30, 1904, in Rochester, New York. Rich was the son of Giles Willard Rich, a patent lawyer, and Sarah Thompson (Sutherland) Rich. His father worked for a variety of clients, including George Eastman, the founder of the Eastman Kodak Company. After his first year of high school his family moved to New York City, where he graduated from the Horace Mann School for Boys in 1922. Rich received a Bachelor of Science degree from Harvard University in 1926 and a Bachelor of Laws from Columbia Law School in 1929. and was admitted to the New York bar.

In the fall of 1929 he joined his father's law firm, Williams Rich & Morse, where he worked as a patent attorney until 1952. From 1952 to 1956, he was in private practice at Churchill, Rich, Weymouth and Engel in New York City. From 1942 to 1956, he was also a lecturer in patent law at Columbia University in its School of General Studies. In the 1940s, motivated by a prize competition, Rich authored a series of law review articles on patent practices and the anti-monopoly laws, and particularly, on contributory infringement and misuse. The series is considered by many to be a classic in the field. He was very active in the work of the New York Patent Law Association, and eventually became its vice president in 1948 and 1949, and its president in 1950 and 1951.

== 1952 Patent Act ==
Rich took an active role in the work of the New York Patent Law Association when it undertook to introduce and foster legislation to address the Supreme Court's Mercoid cases, which virtually destroyed the doctrine of contributory infringement. In 1947 he became part of a two-person committee to draft a new U.S. patent statute, all while continuing to practice law full-time. His partner on the statute drafting committee was Pasquale Joseph Federico, the Examiner-in-Chief of the U.S. Patent Office. After four years of work, Rich and Federico's draft statute was introduced in the Congress by Joseph Bryson (D-SC) in 1951. After passing both houses without substantial debate, as part of a "consent bill", it was signed into law by President Truman in 1952, to take effect in 1953. It was the first full revision of U.S. patent law since the Patent Act of 1870.

== Federal judicial service ==
Rich was nominated by President Dwight D. Eisenhower on May 17, 1956, to an Associate Judge seat on the United States Court of Customs and Patent Appeals vacated by Judge Noble J. Johnson. He was confirmed by the United States Senate on July 19, 1956, and received his commission the same day. Rich was initially appointed as a Judge under Article I, but the court was raised to Article III status by operation of law on August 25, 1958, and Rich thereafter served as an Article III Judge. Rich was reassigned by operation of law to the United States Court of Appeals for the Federal Circuit on October 1, 1982, to a new seat authorized by 96 Stat. 25. At 95, he had become the oldest active federal judge in the history of the United States; he never took senior status, a time when judges typically assume a reduced workload and semi-retire. His service terminated on June 9, 1999, due to his death.

=== Other service ===
Rich also served as an adjunct professor of patent law at Georgetown University from 1963 to 1969. In 1963, he was awarded the Charles F. Kettering Award from the Patent, Trademark, and Copyright Research Institute at George Washington University.

== Notable judicial opinions ==
"Judge Rich's judicial opinions were often notable for their colorful and memorable language. For example, in one case in which a majority of the Federal Circuit judges were unwilling to accept as a binding precedent an earlier decision of that court with which he was apparently in sympathy, he said in dissent that they acted with "defiant disregard" of precedent and added": "[I]t is mutiny. It is heresy. It is illegal."

=== Chakrabarty, Diehr, State Street ===
Judge Rich's judicial opinions include were very groundbreaking, influential, and controversial to modern U.S. patent law. He wrote opinions in which the court struck down prior rulings from the United States Patent and Trademark Office against the patenting of genetically engineered micro-organisms (essentially giving birth to the bio-tech industry) (In re Chakrabarty), software-implemented inventions (In re Diehr), and business methods (State Street Bank v. Signature Financial Group), saying the inventions covered in those patent applications had a proper basis in the current patent statute (the 1952 Patent Act of which he was one of the principal drafters).

=== Controversy over those cases ===
In re Diehr and especially State Street Bank v. Signature Financial Group were highly controversial decisions. Many in the academic and legal community thought that the cases were wrongly decided and examples of judicial activism on the basis of a pro-patentee agenda, and the legal reasoning utilized in these decisions has been severely criticized. For example, in State Street Bank v. Signature Financial Group, Judge Rich justified his conclusion on the basis that the business method exception to patentability was abolished by the 1952 Patent Act. However, this line of reasoning is contradicted by Judge Rich himself, among others. He had earlier stated, in a law review article written not long after the passage of the 1952 Patent Act, that Section 101 of the Act denied patent protection to business methods, observing that the diaper service, "one of the greatest inventions of our times," was patent-ineligible because it was a business method. The State Street decision was substantially overruled in the Federal Circuit's 2008 decision in In re Bilski. The Supreme Court's decisions in the Bilski-Mayo-Alice trilogy even more definitively rejected the line of doctrine that culminated in the State Street decision.

=== Outspoken critic ===
Judge Rich was an outspoken critic of the Supreme Court and Justice Department when they took positions on patent law in opposition to those which he advocated. For example, in his opinion on remand in the case In re Bergy, after the Supreme Court vacated the judgment of the CCPA that he had authored for that court, and remanded the case to the CCPA "for further consideration in light of" the Supreme Court's decision in Parker v. Flook, he wrote a second Bergy opinion for the CCPA. In it he reached the same result and said that Flook shed no light and that the United States Patent and Trdaemark Office had misled the Supreme Court to reach its decision.

=== Controversy over interpretation of 1952 Act ===
This episode was part of a long-running controversy about how the 1952 Patent Act should be interpreted − was it a mere re-codification of prior law without substantive change or did it break new ground? Judge Rich took the position that it broke new ground and that special deference should be given his views because of his relation to the process as one of the principal draftsmen of the bill (the co-draftsmen were Henry Ashton and P.J. Federico, then the Examiner-in-Chief of the United States Patent and Trademark Office). A contrary view – that Congress intended no major substantive change – is reflected in the concurring opinion of Justice Hugo Black in Aro Mfg. Co. v. Convertible Top Replacement Co.

== Recognition and legacy ==
In 1992 Rich earned special recognition from President Bush for his contributions to the U.S. patent code. That same year, Rich was also honored with an American Inn of Court established in his name to foster professionalism, ethics, civility, and legal skills in the area of intellectual property.

Upon learning of Judge Rich's death, the Acting Commissioner of Patents and Trademarks, Q. Todd Dickinson, remarked:

Judge Rich was the single most important figure in twentieth century intellectual property law...Judge Rich leaves a rich legacy in his voluminous body of judicial opinions and in the 1952 Patent Act which he helped to draft. We have lost the dean of the twentieth century patent system.

A prominent annual intellectual property moot court competition, the Giles Rich I.P. Moot Court Competition, run by the American Intellectual Property Law Association, starting in 1974, was named after him.

In 2006 Judge Rich was inducted into the IP Hall of Fame.

== Personal ==
On January 10, 1931, Rich married his first wife, Gertrude Verity Braun, the daughter of a Barnard College professor who was head of the German Department, and they had a daughter, Verity Sutherland, born in 1940. Gertrude died in 1953, and Rich married his second wife, Helen Gill Field the same year. At the time of his death, he was survived by his second wife, Helen; his daughter, Verity Rich Hallinan; a granddaughter; a niece, Eleanor Van Staagen Mitchell; and a nephew.

"He was said to be an accomplished photographer, and known among patent lawyers and judges for his curiosity and familiarity with the mechanics of everyday appliances".

Rich died of lymphoma on June 9, 1999, at Sibley Memorial Hospital in Washington, D.C.

== See also ==
- List of United States federal judges by longevity of service

== Bibliography ==
- Rich, Giles S. (1980). A brief history of the United States Court of Customs and Patent Appeals. Washington, D.C.: Published by authorization of Committee on the Bicentennial of Independence and the Constitution of the Judicial Conference of the United States : U.S. G.P.O.

Legal offices
Preceded by Noble J. Johnson	Associate Judge of the United States Court of Customs and Patent Appeals; 1956–1982	Seat abolished
Preceded by Seat established by 96 Stat. 25	Judge of the United States Court of Appeals for the Federal Circuit; 1982–1999	Succeeded by Richard Linn
