= Judge Chen =

Judge Chen may refer to:

- Edward M. Chen (born 1953), judge of the United States District Court for the Northern District of California
- Pamela K. Chen (born 1961), judge of the United States District Court for the Eastern District of New York
- Raymond T. Chen (born 1968), judge of the United States Court of Appeals for the Federal Circuit
