= Oscar Hirsh Davis =

American judge (1914–1988)

Judge of the United States Court of Appeals for the Federal Circuit
- In office October 1, 1982 – June 19, 1988
- Appointed by: operation of law
- Preceded by: Seat established by 96 Stat. 25
- Succeeded by: Raymond C. Clevenger

Judge of the United States Court of Claims
- In office April 12, 1962 – October 1, 1982
- Appointed by: John F. Kennedy
- Preceded by: J. Warren Madden
- Succeeded by: Seat abolished

Personal details
- Born: Oscar Hirsh Davis; February 27, 1914 New York City, New York, U.S.
- Died: June 19, 1988 (aged 74) Washington, D.C., U.S.
- Education: Harvard University (AB); Columbia Law School (LLB)

Oscar Hirsh Davis (February 27, 1914 – June 19, 1988) was a judge of the United States Court of Claims and a United States Circuit Judge of the United States Court of Appeals for the Federal Circuit.

== Education and career ==
Born on February 27, 1914, in New York City, New York, Davis received an Artium Baccalaureus degree in 1934 from Harvard University and a Bachelor of Laws in 1937 from Columbia Law School. He entered private practice in New York City from 1937 to 1939. He was an attorney in the Claims Division of the United States Department of Justice from 1939 to 1942. He was a captain in the United States Army Air Corps from 1942 to 1946. He was an attorney in the Civil Division of the United States Department of Justice from 1946 to 1948. He was second assistant to the United States Solicitor General from 1950 to 1954 and first assistant from 1954 to 1962.

== Federal judicial service ==
Davis was nominated by President John F. Kennedy on January 31, 1962, to a seat on the United States Court of Claims vacated by Judge J. Warren Madden. He was confirmed by the United States Senate on April 11, 1962, and received his commission on April 12, 1962. He was a member of the Judicial Conference of the United States from 1977 to 1978. He was reassigned by operation of law to the United States Court of Appeals for the Federal Circuit on October 1, 1982, to a new seat authorized by 96 Stat. 25. His service terminated on June 19, 1988, due to his death of cancer in Washington, D.C.

== Sources ==
Legal offices
Preceded by J. Warren Madden	Judge of the United States Court of Claims; 1962–1982	Succeeded by Seat abolished
Preceded by Seat established by 96 Stat. 25	Judge of the United States Court of Appeals for the Federal Circuit; 1982–1988	Succeeded by Raymond C. Clevenger
