= Edward Samuel Smith =

American judge (1919–2001)

Senior Judge of the United States Court of Appeals for the Federal Circuit
- In office June 1, 1989 – March 22, 2001

Judge of the United States Court of Appeals for the Federal Circuit
- In office October 1, 1982 – June 1, 1989
- Appointed by: operation of law
- Preceded by: Seat established by 96 Stat. 25
- Succeeded by: Alvin Anthony Schall

Judge of the United States Court of Claims
- In office July 28, 1978 – October 1, 1982
- Appointed by: Jimmy Carter
- Preceded by: Byron George Skelton
- Succeeded by: Seat abolished

Personal details
- Born: Edward Samuel Smith; March 27, 1919 Birmingham, Alabama
- Died: March 22, 2001 (aged 81) Birmingham, Alabama
- Education: University of Virginia (BA); University of Virginia School of Law (JD)

Edward Samuel Smith (March 27, 1919 – March 22, 2001) was a United States circuit judge of the United States Court of Appeals for the Federal Circuit and previously a United States Judge of the United States Court of Claims.

== Education and career ==
Born in Birmingham, Alabama, Smith received a Bachelor of Arts degree from the University of Virginia in 1941 and served as a lieutenant in the United States Naval Reserve during World War II, from 1941 to 1946. He received a Juris Doctor from the University of Virginia School of Law in 1947 and entered private practice in Washington, D.C. from 1947 to 1961. He joined the Tax Division of the United States Department of Justice, first as chief of the trial section in 1961, and then as a deputy assistant attorney general for civil trials from 1962 to 1963. He returned to private practice in Baltimore, Maryland from 1963 to 1978.

== Federal judicial service ==
Smith was nominated by President Jimmy Carter on June 30, 1978, to a seat on the United States Court of Claims vacated by Judge Byron George Skelton. He was confirmed by the United States Senate on July 26, 1978, and received commission on July 28, 1978. His service was terminated on October 1, 1982, due to reassignment to the Federal Circuit.

Smith was reassigned by operation of law on October 1, 1982, to the United States Court of Appeals for the Federal Circuit, to a new seat authorized by 96 Stat. 25. He assumed senior status on June 1, 1989. His service terminated on March 22, 2001, due to his death in Birmingham.

== Sources ==
Legal offices
Preceded by Byron George Skelton	Judge of the United States Court of Claims; 1978–1982	Succeeded by Seat abolished
Preceded by Seat established by 96 Stat. 25	Judge of the United States Court of Appeals for the Federal Circuit; 1982–1989	Succeeded by Alvin Anthony Schall
