= Raymond Clevenger =

Raymond Clevenger may refer to:

- Raymond C. Clevenger (born 1937), American jurist on the United States Court of Appeals for the Federal Circuit
- Raymond F. Clevenger (1926–2016), U.S. Representative from Michigan
