= Robert M. M. Seto =

American judge (born 1936)

Robert Seto
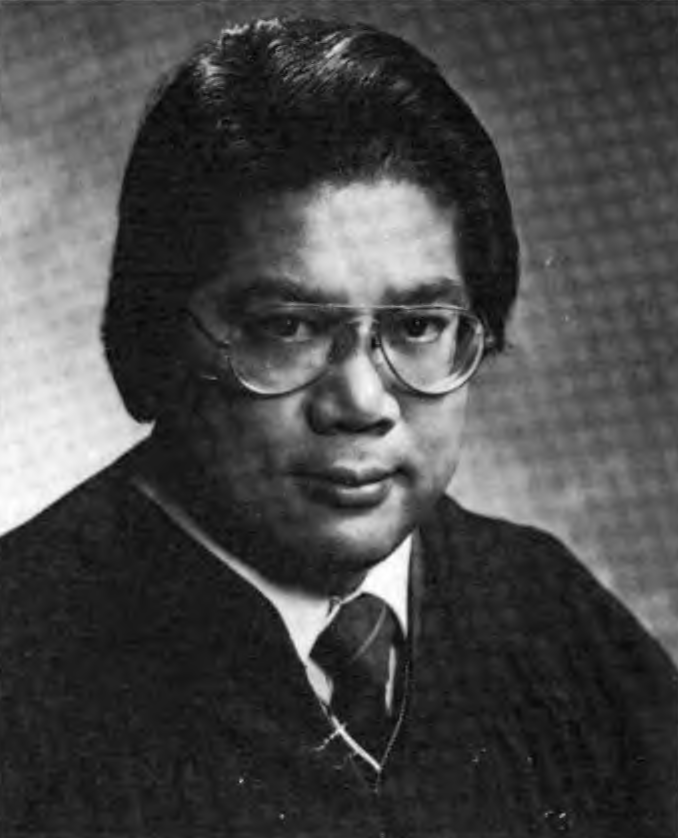

Judge of the United States Court of Federal Claims
- In office October 1, 1982 – June 20, 1987
- Preceded by: Seat established
- Succeeded by: Randall Ray Rader

Personal details
- Born: Robert Ming Seto; May 12, 1936 (age 89) Canton, China (now Guangzhou, China)
- Political party: Republican
- Education: Saint Louis University, (BS, JD)

Robert Mahealani Ming Seto (born Robert Ming Seto, May 12, 1936) is a law professor and a former judge of the United States Court of Federal Claims from 1982 to 1987.

Born in Canton, China, Seto received a Bachelor of Science in chemistry from Saint Louis University in 1962, and a Juris Doctor from the Saint Louis University School of Law in 1968. He later received a Master of Laws in government contract law from the George Washington University Law School.

Seto was an assistant circuit attorney for the Felony Division of St. Louis, Missouri from 1968 to 1969, then became patent counsel to Monsanto Chemical Co. from 1969 to 1970, and deputy corporation counsel in the Division of Legal Memorandums and Opinions for the City and County of Honolulu, Hawaii, from 1970 to 1971. Seto then held several staff positions in the United States Senate, serving as Republican minority counsel to the U.S. Senate Special Committee on Aging from 1971 to 1973, then as legislative counsel to the Subcommittee on Immigration and Naturalization of the U.S. Senate Committee on the Judiciary in 1974, and then chief patent counsel to U.S. Senator Hiram Fong of Hawaii, for the Subcommittee on Patents, Trademarks, and Copyrights, U.S. Senate Committee on the Judiciary, from 1975 to 1976.

Seto was a senior patent litigation attorney for the United States International Trade Commission from 1976 to 1981. He became a trial judge of the United States Court of Claims in 1981, and on October 1, 1982 he was elevated by operation of law to a new seat on the United States Court of Federal Claims authorized by 96 Stat. 27. He resigned on June 20, 1987, to become an administrative judge for the Board of Contract Appeals of the United States Department of Agriculture, a position he held until 1998. Since 1998, Seto has been a professor at Regent University School of Law.

In 2005, Seto "suffered a debilitating stroke that impaired him both physically and emotionally". In a disciplinary action in 2011, Seto agreed to be voluntarily suspended from practice before the United States Patent and Trademark Office for four years for misconduct in connection with the practice of his son, Jeffrey. The settlement stipulated that Seto had "assisted his son in the unauthorized practice of patent and trademark law while his son was employed as a patent examiner at the Office", a position that precluded the son from practicing before the office. Seto was reciprocally suspended from practice by the Supreme Court of Hawaii on January 5, 2012, and by the Supreme Court of the United States on April 30, 2012.

== Publications ==
- A Federal Judge's View of the Most Important Changes in Patent Law in a Half-a-Century, University of Florida Law Journal of Technology Law & Policy, Spring 2007.
- Is Jesus Entitled to a Copyright?, Regent University Law Journal, Spring 2003.
- The Five Billion Dollar Involuntary Servitude, Regent University Law Review, Fall 2003.
- Basic Ordering Agreements: The Catch-22 Chameleon of Government Contract Law, Southern Methodist University Law Review, Spring 2002.
- Of Princesses, Charities, Trustees, and Fairytales: A Lesson of the Simple Wishes of Princess Bernice Pauhi Bishop, University of Hawaii Law Review, Symposium Issue on the Bishop Estate Controversy. Volume 21, Number 2, Winter 1999.

Legal offices
New seat	Judge of the United States Court of Federal Claims; 1982–1987	Succeeded by Randall Ray Rader
