= Byron George Skelton =

American judge

Senior Judge of the United States Court of Appeals for the Federal Circuit
- In office October 1, 1982 – February 6, 2004

Senior Judge of the United States Court of Claims
- In office May 1, 1977 – October 1, 1982

Judge of the United States Court of Claims
- In office November 3, 1966 – May 1, 1977
- Appointed by: Lyndon B. Johnson
- Preceded by: Seat established by 80 Stat. 139
- Succeeded by: Edward Samuel Smith

Personal details
- Born: Byron George Skelton; September 1, 1905 Florence, Texas
- Died: February 6, 2004 (aged 98)
- Education: University of Texas at Austin (BA, MA); University of Texas School of Law (LLB)

Byron George Skelton (September 1, 1905 – February 6, 2004) was a judge of the United States Court of Claims.

== Education and career ==
Born September 1, 1905, in Florence, Williamson County, Texas, Skelton received a Bachelor of Arts degree in 1927 from the University of Texas at Austin and a Master of Arts degree in 1928 from the same institution. He received a Bachelor of Laws in 1931 from the University of Texas School of Law. He entered private practice in Temple, Texas from 1931 to 1942. He served as county attorney of Bell County, Texas from 1934 to 1938. He was special assistant to the United States Ambassador to Argentina with the United States Department of State from 1942 to 1945. He was the city attorney of Temple from 1945 to 1960, concurrently returning to private practice in Temple from 1945 to 1966.

== Federal judicial service ==
Skelton was nominated by President Lyndon B. Johnson on August 17, 1966, to the United States Court of Claims, to a new seat authorized by 80 Stat. 139. He was confirmed by the United States Senate on October 20, 1966, and received his commission on November 3, 1966. He assumed senior status on May 1, 1977. He was reassigned by operation of law to the United States Court of Appeals for the Federal Circuit on October 1, 1982, by 96 Stat. 25. His service terminated on February 6, 2004, due to his death.

== Sources ==
- Bennett, Ma rion T. (1991). The United States Court of Appeals for the Federal Circuit: A History, 1982–1990. Washington, D.C.: United States Judicial Conference Committee on the Bicentennial of the Constitution of the United States. p. 97. LCCN 91601231.

Legal offices
Preceded by Seat established by 80 Stat. 139	Judge of the United States Court of Claims; 1966–1977	Succeeded by Edward Samuel Smith
