= Divided infringement =

Form of patent infringement liability

In United States patent law, divided infringement is a form of patent infringement liability that occurs when multiple actors are involved in carrying out the claimed infringement of a system or method patent. In the case of a method patent, no single accused infringer can performed all of the steps of the method. In a 2015 decision of the United States Court of Appeals for the Federal Circuit, Akamai Techs., Inc. v. Limelight Networks, Inc. the court expanded the doctrine and explained the current meaning of the term.

The court said that the problem in divided infringement is determining, when "more than one actor is involved in practicing the steps" of a method claim of a patent, whether the acts of one actor are attributable to the other actor such that second one is to be held "responsible for the infringement." The court said that it would hold one entity responsible for another's performance of method steps in two sets of circumstances:

1. "where that entity directs or controls others' performance", and
2. "where the actors form a joint enterprise."

In past cases, the court noted that it had held that an actor liable for divided infringement under 35 U.S.C. § 271(a) only when "it acts through an agent (applying traditional agency principles) or contracts with another to perform one or more steps of a claimed method." To those two circumstances, the court held that it would now add a third:

We conclude, on the facts of this case, that liability under § 271(a) can also be found when an alleged infringer conditions participation in an activity or receipt of a benefit upon performance of a step or steps of a patented method and establishes the manner or timing of that performance.

The court instructed also that the "joint enterprise" basis for liability required evidence and proof of four elements:

(1) an agreement, express or implied, among the members of the group;

(2) a common purpose to be carried out by the group;

(3) a community of pecuniary interest in that purpose, among the members; and

(4) an equal right to a voice in the direction of the enterprise, which gives an equal right of control.
