= John William Potter =

American judge

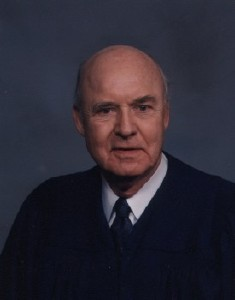

Senior Judge of the United States District Court for the Northern District of Ohio
- In office August 1, 1992 – October 3, 2013

Judge of the United States District Court for the Northern District of Ohio
- In office June 21, 1982 – August 1, 1992
- Appointed by: Ronald Reagan
- Preceded by: William Kernahan Thomas
- Succeeded by: Kathleen M. O'Malley

52nd Mayor of Toledo
- In office 1961–1967
- Preceded by: Michael J. Damas
- Succeeded by: William J. Ensign

Personal details
- Born: John William Potter; October 25, 1918 Toledo, Ohio, U.S.
- Died: October 3, 2013 (aged 94) Toledo, Ohio, U.S.
- Education: University of Toledo (Ph.B.); University of Michigan Law School (J.D.)

John William Potter (October 25, 1918 – October 3, 2013) was a United States district judge of the United States District Court for the Northern District of Ohio.

== Education and career ==
Born in Toledo, Ohio, Potter received a Bachelor of Philosophy from the University of Toledo in 1940 and a Juris Doctor from the University of Michigan Law School in 1946. He joined the United States Army Reserve, serving from 1946 to 1951 and achieving the rank of captain. Potter was in private practice in Toledo from 1947 to 1969. He was mayor of Toledo from 1961 to 1967. He was an assistant state attorney general of Ohio from 1968 to 1969, and was then a judge on the Ohio Sixth District Courts of Appeals until 1982.

== Federal judicial service ==
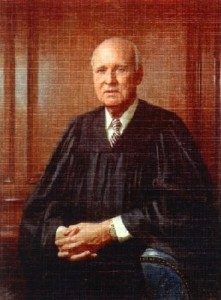
Judicial portrait of Potter, 2002, by Robert Kuester.

On May 5, 1982, Potter was nominated by President Ronald Reagan to a seat on the United States District Court for the Northern District of Ohio vacated by Judge William Kernahan Thomas. Potter was confirmed by the United States Senate on June 18, 1982, and received his commission on June 21, 1982. He assumed senior status on August 1, 1992, serving in that status until his death on October 3, 2013, in Toledo.

== Sources ==
- John W. Potter Papers The University of Toledo
- John William Potter's obituary

Legal offices
Preceded by William Kernahan Thomas	Judge of the United States District Court for the Northern District of Ohio; 1982–1992	Succeeded by Kathleen M. O'Malley
