= William Kernahan Thomas =

American judge

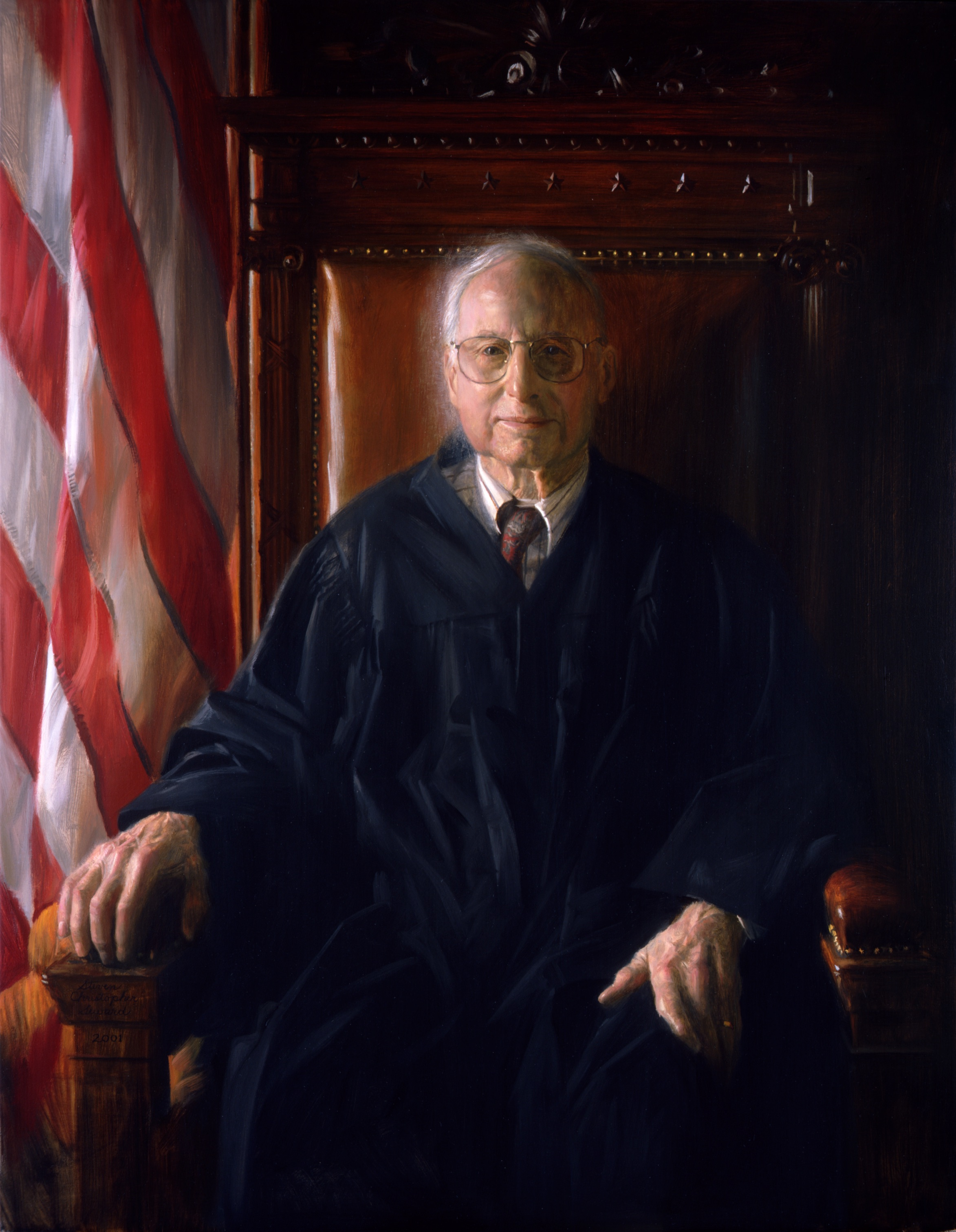
- Judicial portrait of Thomas, 2001, by Steven Christopher Seward.

Senior Judge of the United States District Court for the Northern District of Ohio
- In office February 15, 1981 – March 20, 2001

Judge of the United States District Court for the Northern District of Ohio
- In office March 7, 1966 – February 15, 1981
- Appointed by: Lyndon B. Johnson
- Preceded by: Paul Jones
- Succeeded by: John William Potter

Personal details
- Born: William Kernahan Thomas; February 15, 1911 Columbus, Ohio
- Died: March 20, 2001 (aged 90) Cleveland, Ohio
- Education: Ohio State University (B.A.); Ohio State University Moritz College of Law (J.D.)

William Kernahan Thomas (February 15, 1911 – March 20, 2001) was a United States district judge of the United States District Court for the Northern District of Ohio.

== Education and career ==
Born in Columbus, Ohio, Thomas received a Bachelor of Arts degree from Ohio State University in 1932 and a Juris Doctor from Ohio State University Moritz College of Law in 1935. He was in private practice in Cleveland, Ohio from 1935 to 1944. He was a United States Naval Reserve Lieutenant during World War II, from 1944 to 1946. He was in private practice in Cleveland from 1946 to 1950. He was a judge of the Court of Common Pleas for Geauga County, Ohio from 1950 to 1953. He was a judge of the Court of Common Pleas for Cuyahoga County, Ohio from 1953 to 1966.

== Federal judicial service ==
Thomas was nominated by President Lyndon B. Johnson on January 19, 1966, to a seat on the United States District Court for the Northern District of Ohio vacated by Judge Paul Jones. He was confirmed by the United States Senate on March 4, 1966, and received his commission on March 7, 1966. He assumed senior status on February 15, 1981. Thomas served in that capacity until his death on March 20, 2001, in Cleveland.

== Sources ==
Legal offices
Preceded by Paul Jones	Judge of the United States District Court for the Northern District of Ohio; 1966–1981	Succeeded by John William Potter
