= Kimberly A. Moore =

American judge (born 1968)

Kim Moore
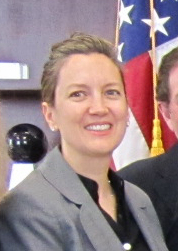
- Moore in 2011

Chief Judge of the United States Court of Appeals for the Federal Circuit
- Incumbent
- Assumed office May 22, 2021
- Preceded by: Sharon Prost

Judge of the United States Court of Appeals for the Federal Circuit
- Incumbent
- Assumed office September 8, 2006
- Appointed by: George W. Bush
- Preceded by: Raymond C. Clevenger

Personal details
- Born: Kimberly Ann Pace; June 15, 1968 (age 58) Halethorpe, Maryland, U.S.
- Education: Massachusetts Institute of Technology (BS, MS); Georgetown University (JD)

Kimberly Ann Moore (née Pace; born June 15, 1968) is an American lawyer and jurist serving as chief United States circuit judge of the United States Court of Appeals for the Federal Circuit.

== Early life and education ==
Moore was born in Halethorpe, Maryland. Moore received a Bachelor of Science degree in electrical engineering in 1990 and a Master of Science in 1991 from the Massachusetts Institute of Technology. She received her Juris Doctor, cum laude, from the Georgetown University Law Center in 1994.

== Career ==
From 1988 to 1992, Moore was employed in electrical engineering with the Naval Surface Warfare Center. She worked in private practice as an associate with the law firm of Kirkland & Ellis in Los Angeles, California from 1994 to 1995, and then clerked for United States Federal Circuit Judge Glenn L. Archer Jr. from 1995 to 1997.

Moore taught at the Chicago-Kent College of Law from 1997 to 1999 and at the University of Maryland Francis King Carey School of Law from 1999 to 2000. She subsequently taught at the George Mason University School of Law as an associate professor from 2000 to 2004 and professor of law from 2004 until her appointment. Prior to her appointment, Moore also served as a mediator for the Federal Circuit Appellate Mediation Pilot Program. She also served as a lecturer for the Barbri Patent Bar Review, a review program for the USPTO registration examination.

=== Federal judicial service ===
On May 18, 2006, President George W. Bush nominated Moore to serve as a United States circuit judge of the United States Court of Appeals for the Federal Circuit. She was nominated to fill a seat vacated by Judge Raymond C. Clevenger III, who assumed senior status on February 1, 2006. On September 5, 2006, her nomination was confirmed in the Senate by a 92–0 vote. She received her commission on September 8, 2006. On May 22, 2021, Moore became chief judge, succeeding Sharon Prost.

In December 2015, Moore wrote the Federal Circuit opinion in In re Tam, allowing Asian-American band The Slants to register their name, and overturning a previous ruling that had upheld the United States Patent and Trademark Office's ability to reject trademarks it deemed offensive or disparaging to others.

=== Publications ===
Moore authored Patent Litigation and Strategy with Federal Circuit Chief Judge Paul Redmond Michel, Raphael V. Lupo (1st and 2nd editions), Professor Timothy R. Holbrook of Emory Law School (3d and 4th editions), and John Frank Murphy (4th ed.). She was also editor-in-chief of the Federal Circuit Bar Journal.

== Personal life ==
Moore has four children with her husband, Matt, who is a partner at Latham & Watkins LLP. Moore is Catholic, and attends the same church as the late Justice Antonin Scalia did. She has chambers in the Howard T. Markey National Courts Building in Washington, D.C.

Legal offices
Preceded by Raymond C. Clevenger	Judge of the United States Court of Appeals for the Federal Circuit; 2006–present	Incumbent
Preceded by Sharon Prost	Chief Judge of the United States Court of Appeals for the Federal Circuit; 2021–present	Incumbent
