= Raymond T. Chen =

American judge (born 1968)

Raymond Chen
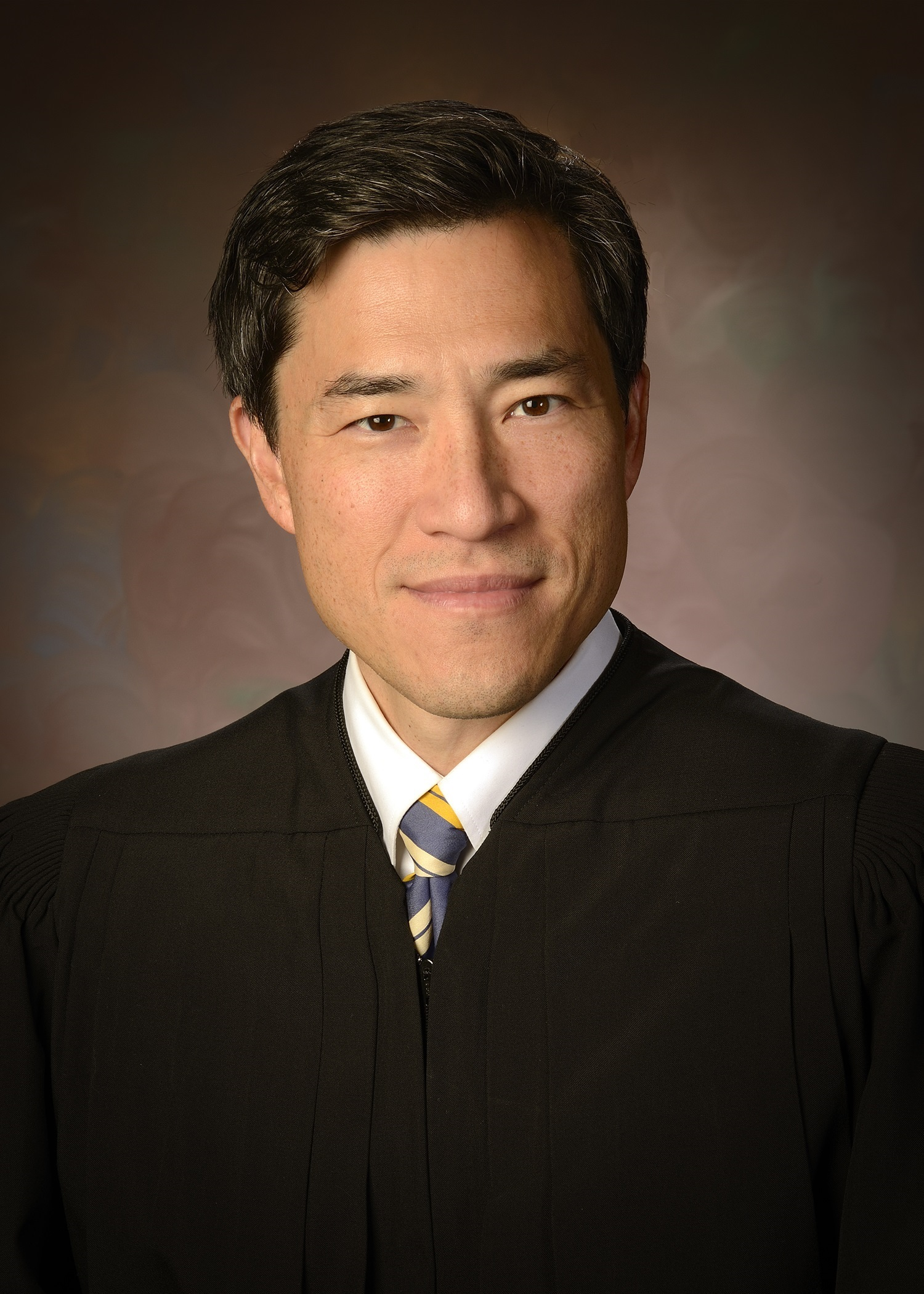
- Official portrait, 2013

Judge of the United States Court of Appeals for the Federal Circuit
- Incumbent
- Assumed office August 2, 2013
- Appointed by: Barack Obama
- Preceded by: Richard Linn

Personal details
- Born: Raymond Tsong-he Chen; 1968 (age 57–58) New York City, New York, U.S.
- Spouse: Lisa Kuang-ling Hsiao (m. 1997)
- Education: University of California, Los Angeles (BS); New York University (JD)

Raymond Tsong-he Chen (Chinese: 陳中和; pinyin: Chén Zhōnghé; born 1968) is an American lawyer who has served as a United States circuit judge of the United States Court of Appeals for the Federal Circuit since 2013.

== Early life and education ==
Chen was born in 1968 in New York City to a Taiwanese American family. He was raised in Huntington Beach, California, where he graduated from Edison High School in 1986. Both of his parents earned doctorates; Chen's father, Paul Chen, was a senior chemical engineer at an engineering company in Irvine, California, and his mother, Pei-ching Chen, worked as a software engineer at the NASA Jet Propulsion Laboratory. Chen's maternal grandfather, Tsuin-chen Ou, was a member of the Kuomintang who served as the vice minister of education in Taiwan.

After high school, Chen received a scholarship from United Technologies to study at the University of California, Los Angeles, graduating in 1990 with a Bachelor of Science (B.S.) in electrical engineering with membership in Tau Beta Pi and Eta Kappa Nu. From 1989 to 1991, he was employed as a scientist for the law firm of Hecker & Harriman (now Hecker Law Group). He then earned a Juris Doctor (J.D.) from the New York University School of Law in 1994.

== Law Career ==
Chen was admitted to the State Bar of California in 1994 and joined the intellectual property law firm of Knobbe, Martens, Olson & Bear in Irvine, California. He prosecuted patents and represented clients in intellectual property litigation at that firm. From 1996 to 1998, he served as a technical assistant at the United States Court of Appeals for the Federal Circuit, performing the functions of a staff attorney. From 1998 to 2013, he served in the United States Patent and Trademark Office as an assistant solicitor and was promoted to Solicitor in 2008. He represented the USPTO before the Federal Circuit, personally arguing twenty cases, including In re Bilski, In re Nuijten, and In re Comiskey. In that role, he issued guidance to patent examiners, advised the agency on legal and policy issues and helped promulgate regulations. He has co-chaired the Patent and Trademark Office Committee of the Federal Circuit Bar Association and is a member of the Advisory Council for the Federal Circuit.

=== Federal judicial service ===
On February 7, 2013, President Barack Obama nominated Chen to serve as a United States circuit judge of the United States Court of Appeals for the Federal Circuit, to the seat vacated by Judge Richard Linn who assumed senior status on October 31, 2012. His nomination was reported by the Senate Judiciary Committee on May 16, 2013, by a voice vote. The Senate confirmed Chen's nomination on August 1, 2013 by a 97–0 vote. He received his commission on August 2, 2013. He assumed office on August 5, 2013. Chen is also the second Asian American judge to be on the Federal Circuit, the first being Shiro Kashiwa (1982–1986).

== Personal life ==
Chen's wife, Lisa Kuang-ling Hsiao, was an associate attorney at the law firm of Verner, Liipfert, Bernhard, McPherson and Hand. She graduated magna cum laude from Yale University. They married on August 23, 1997.

As of 2024, Chen is a member of the board of trustees of the New York University School of Law.

== See also ==
- List of Asian American jurists

Legal offices
Preceded by Richard Linn	Judge of the United States Court of Appeals for the Federal Circuit; 2013–present	Incumbent
