= Alvin Anthony Schall =

American judge (born 1944)

Alvin Schall
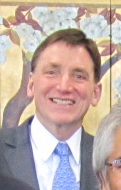
- Schall in 2011

Senior Judge of the United States Court of Appeals for the Federal Circuit
- Incumbent
- Assumed office October 5, 2009

Judge of the United States Court of Appeals for the Federal Circuit
- In office August 17, 1992 – October 5, 2009
- Appointed by: George H. W. Bush
- Preceded by: Edward Samuel Smith
- Succeeded by: Kathleen M. O'Malley

Personal details
- Born: Alvin Anthony Schall; April 4, 1944 (age 81); New York City, New York, U.S.
- Education: Princeton University (BA); Tulane University (JD)

Alvin Anthony Schall (born April 4, 1944) is a Senior United States circuit judge of the United States Court of Appeals for the Federal Circuit.

== Early life and education ==
Born in New York City, New York, to Gordon W. Schall and Helen D. Schall, Schall attended St. Paul's School in Concord, New Hampshire, from 1956 to 1962, and received a Bachelor of Arts degree from Princeton University in 1966 and a Juris Doctor from Tulane University Law School in 1969.

== Professional career ==
Schall was in private practice with the law firm of Shearman and Sterling in New York City from 1969 to 1973, before becoming an Assistant United States Attorney in the Eastern District of New York from 1973 to 1978. He was chief of the appeals division from 1977 to 1978, and a trial attorney of the civil division of the United States Department of Justice from 1978 to 1987. He was a senior trial counsel from 1986 to 1987. He briefly returned to private practice in Washington, D.C. from 1987 to 1988, with the law firm of Perlman and Partners, and was then an Assistant to the United States Attorney General from 1988 to 1992. In 1989, he authored the "Federal Contract Disputes and Forums", chapter in Construction Litigation: Strategies and Techniques, published by John Wiley and Sons.

== Federal judicial service ==
On March 3, 1992, Schall was nominated by President George H. W. Bush to a seat on the United States Court of Appeals for the Federal Circuit vacated by Edward Samuel Smith. Schall was confirmed by the United States Senate on August 12, 1992, and received his commission on August 17, 1992. Schall assumed senior status on October 5, 2009.

== Personal life ==
Schall married Sharon Frances LeBlanc, with whom he had one daughter and one son.

== Sources ==
- FJC Bio

Legal offices
Preceded by Edward Samuel Smith	Judge of the United States Court of Appeals for the Federal Circuit; 1992–2009	Succeeded by Kathleen M. O'Malley
