= Richard Linn =

American judge (born 1944)

- Linn in 2012

Senior Judge of the United States Court of Appeals for the Federal Circuit
- Incumbent
- Assumed office October 31, 2012

Judge of the United States Court of Appeals for the Federal Circuit
- In office November 20, 1999 – October 31, 2012
- Appointed by: Bill Clinton
- Preceded by: Giles Rich
- Succeeded by: Raymond T. Chen

Personal details
- Born: April 13, 1944 (age 82) New York City, New York, U.S.
- Education: Rensselaer Polytechnic Institute (BS); Georgetown University (JD)

Richard Linn (born April 13, 1944 in Brooklyn, New York) is a Senior United States circuit judge of the United States Court of Appeals for the Federal Circuit.

== Education and Experience ==
As a youth, Linn attended Poly Prep Country Day School. He earned a Bachelor of Electrical Engineering degree from Rensselaer Polytechnic Institute in 1965. He was a patent examiner, United States Patent and Trademark Office from 1965 to 1968. He earned a Juris Doctor from Georgetown University Law Center in 1969. Linn served as a patent adviser in the Office of Naval Research of the Naval Air Systems Command from 1971 to 1972. He specialized in patent and intellectual property law in private practice at the law firms of Marks & Murase, and Foley & Lardner.

== Federal judicial service ==
Linn was nominated by President Bill Clinton on September 28, 1999, to a seat on the United States Court of Appeals for the Federal Circuit vacated by Judge Giles Rich. He was confirmed by the United States Senate on November 19, 1999, and received commission on November 22, 1999. He was sworn in on January 1, 2000. He assumed senior status on October 31, 2012.

== Other work ==
From 2001 to 2003, he was an adjunct professor at George Washington University Law School. Linn was a founding member of the Board of Governors of the Virginia State Bar Section on Patent, Trademark and Copyright Law. He received the Rensselaer Alumni Association Fellows Award in 2000.

== Linn Inn Alliance ==
Linn became actively involved in the American Inns of Court movement upon joining the Federal Circuit in 2000, when he began attending monthly meetings of the Giles Sutherland Rich American Inn of Court at the Federal Circuit. Linn later served a term as President of the Giles Rich Inn.

The Richard Linn American Inn of Court was formed in Chicago on the initiative of Olivia Luk, a lawyer who had been mentored by Linn at the Giles Rich Inn. Upon moving to Chicago, Luk found that there was no Inn of Court focused on intellectual property there, and asked for Linn's help in forming an organizing committee. The organizers later decided to name the Inn for him in honor of his contributions to intellectual property law, and the Linn Inn was chartered in 2007.

The Linn Inn Alliance also began in 2007, as an alliance of the Linn Inn with the four previously-existing intellectual property focused American Inns of Court: the Giles Rich Inn, the John Lifland Inn (New Jersey), the Benjamin Franklin Inn (Philadelphia), and the San Francisco Bay Area IP Inn of Court. Expanding this alliance, Linn set out to form additional intellectual property focused Inns of Court in most major American cities, and within five years, the Tokyo IP Inn of Court became the 21st member of the Linn Inn Alliance, and the first to be formed outside the United States. Through the alliance, the IP Inns share their creative programs and allow visiting attorneys to attend meetings of sister Inns while traveling.

== Notable cases ==
- NTP, Inc. v. Research In Motion (BlackBerry patent litigation)
- 800 Adept v. Targus (Toll-free telephone number patent litigation)
- Uniloc USA, Inc. v. Microsoft Corp., 632 F.3d 1292 (Fed. Cir. 2011) (patent damages 25% Rule rejected)

Legal offices
Preceded by Giles Rich	Judge of the United States Court of Appeals for the Federal Circuit; 1999–2012	Succeeded by Raymond T. Chen
