= Pretermitted heir =

Concept in property law

In the law of property, a pretermitted heir is a person who would likely stand to inherit under a will, except that the testator (the person who wrote the will) did not include the person in the testator's will. Omission may occur because the testator did not know of the omitted person at the time the will was written.

A will may contain a clause that explicitly disinherits any heirs unknown at the time that the will is executed, or any heirs not named in the will. While such a clause will not necessarily prevent a claim against an estate by a pretermitted heir, it may make it more difficult to succeed in such an action.

== Pretermitted child ==
One common category of pretermitted heir is the pretermitted child, born after the writing of the will. Claims may also potentially be brought by children born outside of the decedent's marital relationship.

A person who claims to be a pretermitted child of a deceased parent may bring an action in probate court to contest the parent's will. Many jurisdictions have enacted statutes that permit a pretermitted child to demand an inheritance under the will. Some statutes allow a pretermitted child to claim their intestate share, while others limit the inheritance to an amount that is comparable to devises made in the will for the children who were alive when the will was written.

Some jurisdictions provide the same rights for a child who was pretermitted because, although born before the will was executed, he was not known of at the time the will was made. This may be because the child was incorrectly believed to be dead, or was adopted by the testator after the will was drafted.

Some jurisdictions prohibit a pretermitted child from claiming an inheritance if the will devised substantially all of the testator's estate to the surviving spouse, and the surviving spouse is the other parent of the pretermitted child. A child may also be denied the right to take under the will as a pretermitted heir if the child received an advancement against their inheritance - an inter vivos gift from the testator of an amount equivalent to what child might have otherwise received under the will.

When a court finds that a child was pretermitted and is entitled to inheritance, in order to provide the child with an inheritance the court may proportionally reduce the gift under the will to the decedent's other children, or may reduce gifts under the will to non-family members.

== Pretermitted spouse ==
Laws in most nations provide protection for a pretermitted spouse, a spouse whom the testator does not marry until after the execution of the will. Many jurisdictions provide that a pretermitted spouse will receive either her intestate share (what she would have received had the testator died with no will), or an elective share of the deceased spouse's estate (a set amount or formula provided by law for spouses who are fully or partially disinherited in the will).

Like a pretermitted child, a pretermitted spouse may be explicitly disinherited in the will, or may be excluded from taking under the will if they received an advancement on their inheritance in anticipation of the marriage. A pretermitted spouse may also disclaim any interest in the testator's estate through an antenuptial or prenuptial agreement.
