= Knights of Vartan =

Fraternal organization

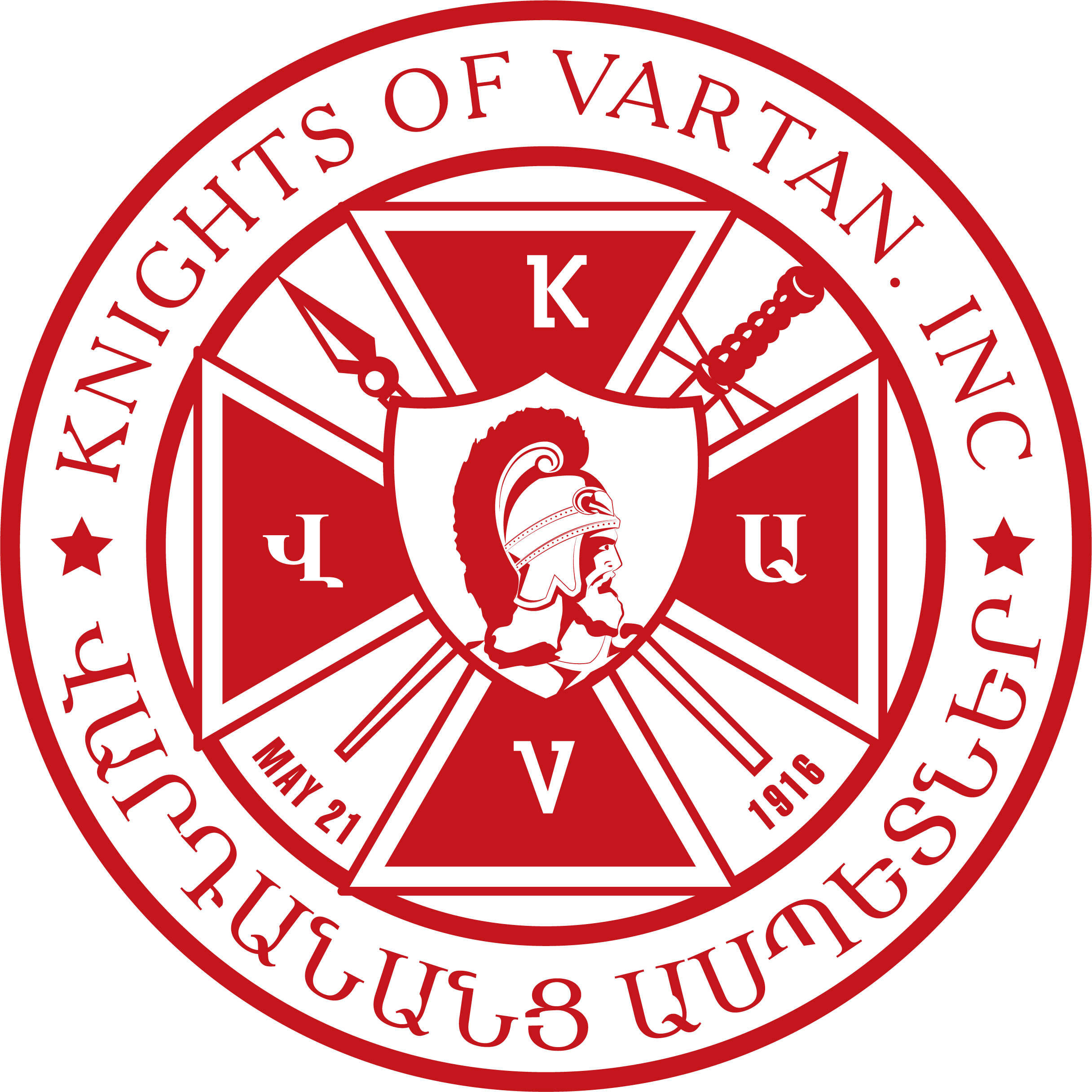
- Emblem of the Knights of Vartan
- Formation: May 27, 1916; 110 years ago
- Founded at: Philadelphia, Pennsylvania
- Type: Armenian fraternal community service
- Website: kofv.org

The Knights of Vartan (Armenian: Վարդանանց Ասպետներ) is a non-political, non-sectarian, non-denominational fraternal organization established in 1916 in the USA that encourages its members to take leadership roles in cultural, educational, religious, and charitable organizations on the local, national and international level for the betterment of Armenians worldwide. The Knights of Vartan emphasizes patriotism, discipline, and knightly virtues, in order to strengthen the fabric of national life. The primary objectives of the Knights of Vartan are to create a spirit of brotherhood and cooperation among Armenians and to instill the principles of charity, justice, noble character and good citizenship.

== History of the establishment of the Knights of Vartan ==
On May 27, 1916, a small group of Armenian community leaders established the Knights of Vartan Brotherhood. The Knights of Vartan's 12 Founding Fathers were: Bishop Papguen Guleserian, Rev. Garabed M. Manavian Rev. Khachadour G. Benneyan, Rev. Haigag H. Khazoyan, Rev. A. A. Bedikian, Rev. Mihran T. Kalajian, Prof. Mardiros Ananigian, Prof. Haroutune Dadourian, Prof. Vahan Babasinian, Mr. Karekin M. Guiragosian, Mr. Garabed Pushman, Mr. Nazareth Gumushguerdanian.

In 1932, the Knights of Vartan decided to organize an affiliated organization, known as the Daughters of Vartan, devoted to the spiritual and cultural ennoblement of Armenian womanhood. The institution of the first Chapter (Otyag) took place on December 18, 1933, in Philadelphia, Pennsylvania.

== Purpose of the organization ==
The Knights of Vartan is an Armenian organization founded after the Armenian genocide and massacre of the Armenian people in 1915. The main aims of the organization are to fight for the recognition of the Armenian genocide, to assuage the pain of the Armenian people suffering from genocide, and to train compatriot leaders to serve the religious, cultural, educational, and charitable needs of the Armenian people throughout the world.

The organization is named after Commander Vartan Mamigonian, a 5th-century Armenian hero.

Vartan Mamigonian was a fifth-century Armenian military commander and nobleman who played a significant role in Armenian history. He led Armenian forces during the Battle of Avarayr in AD 451, a conflict fought against the Sasanian Persian Empire over the preservation of Christianity in Armenia. Although he was killed during the battle, his leadership became an important part of Armenian historical and religious tradition.

The title "Knight" (Asbed), used to designate a member of the Knights of Vartan, signifies the rendering of unselfish and devoted service to the Armenian people and to mankind.

== Activities of the Knights of Vartan ==
The Knights of Vartan is not a welfare organization or a benefit society and therefore does not usually engage directly in fund raising activities. However, it is important to know that the Knights of Vartan is a service organization to inspire and to encourage its members to assume leadership roles in cultural, educational, religious and charitable organizations and activities on a local, national and international level.

On the local level, lodges present educational and cultural programs, give scholarships and distribute books on Armenian subjects as gifts to colleges and libraries, hold annual Vartanantz Programs, annual Christmas Party and Annual Picnic, make donations to Local Churches & Organizations, support Schools in Armenia and more. On the national level, members participate and take leadership roles in various social, philanthropic, compatriotic, religious and educational organizations and activities, provide scholarships to qualified students in American universities and Armenia (American University of Armenia), Yerevan State University and National Polytechnic University of Armenia, building and renovating schools, kindergartens, homes for low income families, supporting orphans, new water pipelines for the rural communities, annually organizing Times Square Commemoration of Armenian Genocide in NYC, established the Armenian Research Center of the University Of Michigan-Dearborn, supporting Armenian churches, supporting the Armenian Eye Care Project; supporting Soup Kitchens in Armenia, and many other contributions to Churches, organizations and charities. In 2016 Knights of Vartan extended operation by opening its Communications Office in Yerevan.

Individual Knights are encouraged to have their own charity projects as well.
