= Kathleen M. O'Malley =

American judge (born 1956)

Kate O'Malley
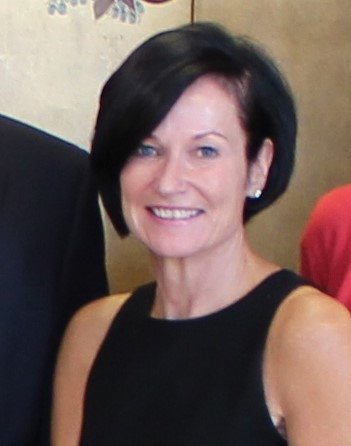

Judge of the United States Court of Appeals for the Federal Circuit
- In office December 27, 2010 – March 11, 2022
- Appointed by: Barack Obama
- Preceded by: Alvin Anthony Schall
- Succeeded by: Leonard P. Stark

Judge of the United States District Court for the Northern District of Ohio
- In office October 12, 1994 – December 27, 2010
- Appointed by: Bill Clinton
- Preceded by: John William Potter
- Succeeded by: Seat abolished

Personal details
- Born: Kathleen Patricia McDonald; November 17, 1956 (age 69) Drexel Hill, Pennsylvania, U.S.
- Spouse: George Pappas
- Education: Kenyon College (AB); Case Western Reserve University (JD)

Kathleen McDonald "Kate" O'Malley (born November 17, 1956) is a former United States circuit judge of the United States Court of Appeals for the Federal Circuit. She is currently of counsel at Sullivan & Cromwell.

== Early life and education ==
Born in Drexel Hill, Pennsylvania, O'Malley received a double Artium Baccalaureus degree from Kenyon College in Gambier, Ohio, in 1979, graduating magna cum laude and Phi Beta Kappa. She had majors in honors history and economics, and she graduated in both with distinction. She received a Juris Doctor from Case Western Reserve University School of Law, Order of the Coif, in 1982, where she served on Law Review and was a member of the National Mock Trial Team.

== Legal career ==
She was a law clerk to Nathaniel R. Jones of the United States Court of Appeals for the Sixth Circuit from 1982 to 1983. She was in private practice in Cleveland, Ohio, from 1983 to 1991, first at Jones, Day, Reavis and Pogue, until 1985, and then with Porter, Wright, Morris & Arthur, where she became a partner, and had a practice with an emphasis on complex corporate and commercial litigations, including intellectual property, securities fraud, trade secrets, shareholder's rights and large-scale coverage disputes. She was chief counsel to the Ohio Attorney General's Office from 1991 to 1993, where she was responsible, under the direction of the Attorney General, for the overall functioning and management of all divisions of the Attorney General's Office, including litigation, law enforcement, legislative activities, policy initiatives and the human resources and administrative aspects of the office. From 1993 to 1994, she was Chief of Staff and First Assistant to the Attorney General, overseeing the work of the office's 350 attorneys and acting as Counsel of Record in the state's more sensitive and complex legal battles.

== Federal judicial service ==
=== Service on district court ===
On September 20, 1994, O'Malley was nominated by President Bill Clinton to a seat on the United States District Court for the Northern District of Ohio vacated by John William Potter. She was confirmed by the United States Senate on October 7, 1994, and received her commission on October 12, 1994. Her service was terminated upon her elevation to the Federal Circuit.

=== Service on court of appeals ===
On March 10, 2010, President Barack Obama nominated O'Malley for elevation to a seat on the United States Court of Appeals for the Federal Circuit. She was confirmed by the United States Senate on December 22, 2010. She received her commission on December 27, 2010. In July 2021, it was announced that O'Malley would retire on March 11, 2022.

=== Notable cases ===
==== Oracle v. Google ====
On May 9, 2014, the Court of Appeals for the Federal Circuit decided the case of Oracle v. Google (authored by Judge O'Malley). The case raised the question of whether the Java API was eligible for copyright protection. The Federal Circuit reversed a lower court finding for Google by concluding that the API was eligible for protection. The Supreme Court denied review of the case at the recommendation of the Solicitor General. Judge O'Malley wrote the second decision in the second appeal in the case overturning the trial court by holding that as a matter of law Google's use of the Java APIs in its Android Operating System was not fair use.

=== Return to private practice ===
One month after retiring from the bench, in April 2022, O'Malley joined Irell & Manella as of counsel at the firm's newly opened Washington, D.C. office. A year later in July 2023, she moved to Sullivan & Cromwell.

== Personal ==
O'Malley is married to Covington & Burling partner George F. Pappas.

== Sources ==
- Kathleen M. O'Malley at Ballotpedia

Legal offices
Preceded by John William Potter	Judge of the United States District Court for the Northern District of Ohio; 1994–2010	Seat abolished
Preceded by Alvin Anthony Schall	Judge of the United States Court of Appeals for the Federal Circuit; 2010–2022	Succeeded by Leonard P. Stark
