= Raymond C. Clevenger =

American judge (born 1937)

Raymond Clevenger
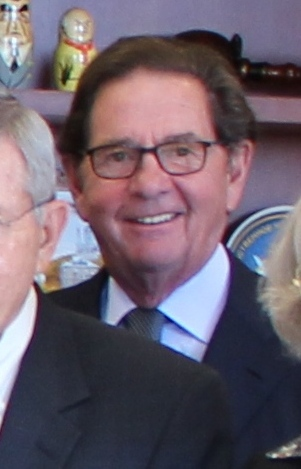
- Clevenger in 2013

Senior Judge of the United States Court of Appeals for the Federal Circuit
- In office February 1, 2006 – October 2, 2026

Judge of the United States Court of Appeals for the Federal Circuit
- In office April 30, 1990 – February 1, 2006
- Appointed by: George H. W. Bush
- Preceded by: Oscar Hirsh Davis
- Succeeded by: Kimberly A. Moore

Personal details
- Born: Raymond Charles Clevenger III; August 27, 1937 (age 89) Topeka, Kansas, U.S.
- Education: Yale University (BA, LLB)

Raymond Charles Clevenger III (born August 27, 1937) is a former United States circuit judge of the United States Court of Appeals for the Federal Circuit.

== Education and career ==
Clevenger was born in Topeka, Kansas. He was educated in the public schools in Topeka and at Phillips Academy in Andover, Massachusetts. Clevenger received a Bachelor of Arts degree from Yale University in 1959, graduating magna cum laude. After a stint at Morgan Guaranty Trust Company, he earned a Bachelor of Laws from Yale Law School in 1966, graduating magna cum laude and Order of the Coif. He was a law clerk to Justice Byron White at the Supreme Court during the October term, 1966 and practiced law at Wilmer, Cutler & Pickering, in Washington, D.C., and London from 1967 to 1990.

== Federal judicial service ==
Clevenger was nominated by President George H. W. Bush to the United States Court of Appeals for the Federal Circuit, to the seat vacated by Judge Oscar Hirsh Davis, on January 24, 1990. He was confirmed on April 27, 1990, received his commission on April 30, 1990 and assumed duties on May 3, 1990. He assumed senior status on February 1, 2006. He retired on October 2, 2026.

== See also ==
- List of law clerks for the sixth seat of the Supreme Court of the United States

Legal offices
Preceded by Oscar Hirsh Davis	Judge of the United States Court of Appeals for the Federal Circuit; 1990–2006	Succeeded by Kimberly A. Moore
