= In re Sherwood =

In re Sherwood was a case decided in 1980 by the United States Court of Customs and Patent Appeals. It dealt with a patent regarding the analysis of seismological data.

== Case details ==
=== Background ===
In 1975, John Sherwood filed a patent for an invention referred to as "Continuous Automatic Migration of Seismic Reflection Data with Waveform Preservation." The invention involved using a computer to measure and analyze seismological data. The patent application was initially rejected on two grounds: that it was unpatentable subject matter and that the 35 U.S.C §112's "best mode" requirement was not fulfilled. This rejection was affirmed by the United States Patent and Trademark Office Board of Appeals. Sherwood then appealed to the United States Court of Customs and Patent Appeals.

=== Issues ===
There were two issues before the court. First was the matter of whether or not the subject matter of the patent was patentable—the examiner and the board had claimed that the patent was for algorithms and thus unpatentable. Second, the court had to decide whether or not the fact that the patent did not disclose source code meant the "best mode" requirement was unfulfilled.

=== Decision ===
The court reversed the decision of the board on both grounds, finding that there was more to the patent claim than just algorithms and that source code disclosure was unnecessary, as someone "skilled in the art" could write the necessary source code.

== Importance ==
In re Sherwood was important primarily because it is one of the first cases to establish that source code disclosure is not necessary for fulfillment of the "best mode" requirement.
