= Randall Ray Rader =

American judge (born 1949)

Randall Rader
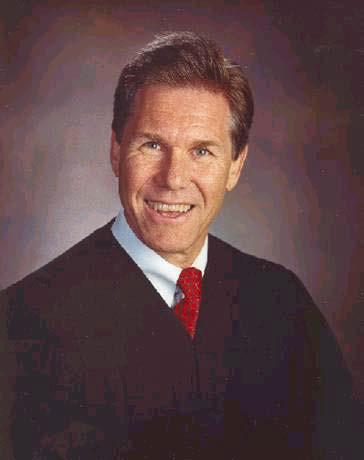

Chief Judge of the United States Court of Appeals for the Federal Circuit
- In office May 31, 2010 – May 30, 2014
- Preceded by: Paul Redmond Michel
- Succeeded by: Sharon Prost

Judge of the United States Court of Appeals for the Federal Circuit
- In office August 9, 1990 – June 30, 2014
- Appointed by: George H. W. Bush
- Preceded by: Jean Galloway Bissell
- Succeeded by: Kara Farnandez Stoll

Judge of the United States Court of Federal Claims
- In office August 12, 1988 – August 14, 1990
- Appointed by: Ronald Reagan
- Preceded by: Robert M. M. Seto
- Succeeded by: Diane Gilbert Sypolt

Personal details
- Born: Randall Ray Rader; April 21, 1949 (age 77) Hastings, Nebraska, U.S.
- Education: Brigham Young University (BA); George Washington University (JD)

Randall Ray Rader (born April 21, 1949) is a former United States Circuit Judge and former Chief Judge of the United States Court of Appeals for the Federal Circuit.

== Early life, education, and career ==
Born in Hastings, Nebraska, Rader received a Bachelor of Arts degree in English from Brigham Young University in 1974 and a Juris Doctor from the George Washington University Law School in 1978. Rader served in staff positions on the United States House of Representatives from 1975 to 1980, first as a legislative assistant to United States Representative Virginia D. Smith from 1975 to 1978, then as counsel to United States Representative Philip Crane, and legislative director of the United States House Committee on Ways and Means from 1978 to 1981. He then served as counsel to the United States Senate Committee on the Judiciary from 1980 to 1988. While counsel to the Judiciary Committee, he was Chief Counsel or Minority Chief Counsel for the Subcommittee on the Constitution and the Subcommittee on Patents, Trademarks, and Copyrights.

== Federal judicial service ==
President Ronald Reagan appointed Rader to the United States Court of Federal Claims in 1988, to succeed Robert M. M. Seto. The United States Senate confirmed the nomination by unanimous consent on August 11, 1988. On June 12, 1990, Rader was nominated by President George H. W. Bush to a seat on the United States Court of Appeals for the Federal Circuit vacated by Judge Jean Galloway Bissell. Rader was confirmed by the Senate on August 3, 1990, and received his commission on August 9, 1990.

While on the Federal Circuit, Rader has served as a law professor, having taught patent law and advanced intellectual property courses at the University of Virginia School of Law, Georgetown University Law Center, Washington, DC, the Munich Intellectual Property Law Center, and the George Washington University Law School, Washington, D.C. Rader is co-author of a casebook on patent law used at over sixty-five law schools. He has received many awards, including the J. William Fulbright Award for Distinguished Public Service, 2000. As an appellate judge, Rader has also led or participated in over sixty delegations to foreign nations, usually to teach rule of law or intellectual property concepts in developing nations.

In 2010, Rader became Chief Judge of the Federal Circuit succeeding Chief Judge Paul Redmond Michel upon his retirement. Along with his new administrative duties, he continued to speak at law schools and at international conferences.

On May 23, 2014, Rader announced his resignation as Chief Judge effective May 30, 2014. Rader remained a judge on the court, and Judge Sharon Prost succeeded him as Chief Judge. On June 13, 2014, Rader announced his retirement from the court effective June 30, 2014. Rader is on the Board of the International IP Commercialization Council (IIPCC.org), a global NPO NGO. Rader also serves as an advisor to the Mimura Komatsu Law Firm in Tokyo, Japan.

=== Breach of an ethical obligation ===
Rader's resignation as Chief Judge and his announcement of retirement came in the wake of his admitted breach of an ethical obligation to not lend the prestige of the judicial office to advance the private interests of others. Rader had sent a laudatory e-mail to a member of the bar of the Federal Circuit and asked that member to show that e-mail to other members of the Bar. Rader also recused himself from a couple of cases he had presided over, due to the participation of the attorney in question.

== Works and publications ==
- Adelman, Martin J.; Randall R. Rader (2003). Cases and materials on patent law (2nd ed.). St. Paul, MN: Thomson/West. ISBN 9780314246370. LCCN 2003267458.
- Adelman, Martin J.; Randall R. Rader (2008). Patent law in a nutshell. St. Paul, MN: Thomson/West. ISBN 9780314256508. LCCN 2008273962.

Legal offices
Preceded by Jean Galloway Bissell	Judge of the United States Court of Appeals for the Federal Circuit; 1990–2014	Succeeded by Kara Farnandez Stoll
Preceded by Paul Redmond Michel	Chief Judge of the United States Court of Appeals for the Federal Circuit; 2010–2014	Succeeded by Sharon Prost
