= United States Court of Appeals for the Federal Circuit =

Current United States federal appellate court

- (Fed. Cir.)
- Location: Howard T. Markey National Courts Building (717 Madison Place, NW; Washington, D.C.)
- Established: October 1, 1982
- Judges: 12
- Circuit Justice: John Roberts
- Chief Judge: Kimberly A. Moore
- cafc.uscourts.gov

The United States Court of Appeals for the Federal Circuit (in case citations, Fed. Cir. or C.A.F.C.) is one of the 13 United States courts of appeals. It has special appellate jurisdiction over all U.S. federal cases involving patents, international trade, trademark registrations, government contracts, veterans' benefits, public safety officers' benefits, federal employees' benefits, and various other types of cases. Unlike the other circuits, the Federal Circuit is a specialized court and has no jurisdiction over criminal, bankruptcy, immigration, or U.S. state law cases. It is headquartered at the Howard T. Markey National Courts Building in Washington, D.C.

The Federal Circuit was created in 1982 with enactment of the Federal Courts Improvement Act, which merged the United States Court of Customs and Patent Appeals and the appellate division of the United States Court of Claims, making the judges of the former courts into circuit judges. In addition to the Markey Building, the court also occupies the adjacent Benjamin Ogle Tayloe House, former Cosmos Club building, and the Cutts–Madison House in Washington, D.C., on Lafayette Square. The court sits from time to time in locations other than Washington, and its judges can and do sit by designation on the benches of other courts of appeals and federal district courts. As of 2016, Washington and Lee University School of Law's Millhiser Moot Courtroom had been designated as the continuity of operations site for the court.

== Jurisdiction ==
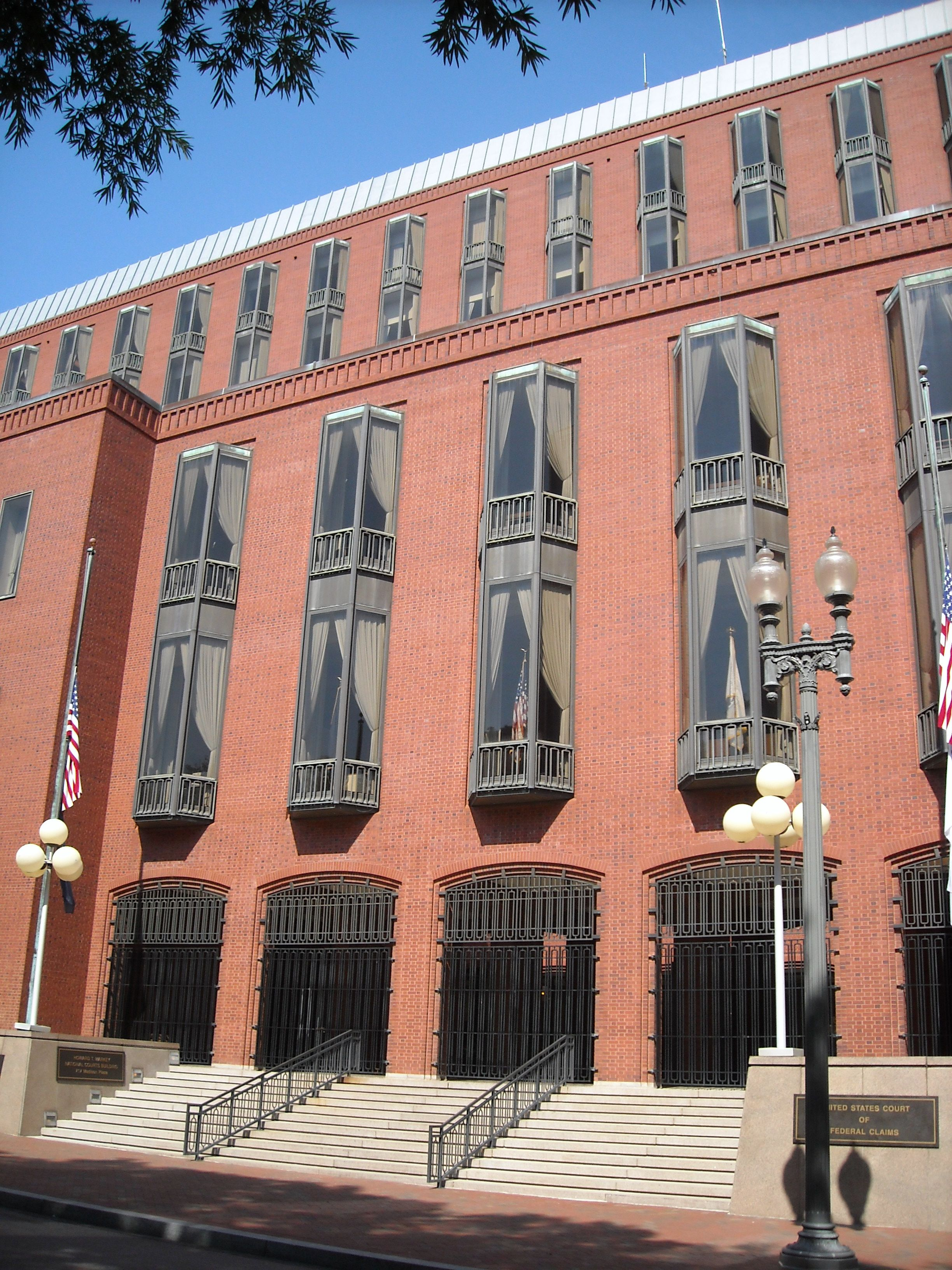
The Howard T. Markey National Courts Building in Washington, D.C., in which the Federal Circuit is located

The Federal Circuit is unique among the courts of appeals in that its jurisdiction is based wholly upon subject matter, not geographic location. The Federal Circuit is an appellate court with jurisdiction generally given in 28 U.S.C. § 1295. The court hears certain appeals from all of the United States District Courts, appeals from certain administrative agencies, and appeals arising under certain statutes. Among other things, the Federal Circuit has exclusive jurisdiction over appeals from:

- Article I tribunals:
  - United States Court of Federal Claims
  - United States Court of Appeals for Veterans Claims
  - United States Trademark Trial and Appeal Board
  - United States Patent Trial and Appeal Board (formerly known as the United States Board of Patent Appeals and Interferences)
  - Boards of contract appeals (for government contract disputes pursuant to the Contract Disputes Act of 1978):
    - Armed Services Board of Contract Appeals
    - Civilian Board of Contract Appeals
    - Postal Service Board of Contract Appeals
  - United States Merit Systems Protection Board (federal employment and employment benefits)
  - United States International Trade Commission
- Article III tribunals:
  - United States Court of International Trade
  - United States district courts relating to:
    - Patents, including appeals arising from an action against the commissioner of patents and trademarks under 35 U.S.C. § 145
    - The Little Tucker Act, 28 U.S.C. § 1346
    - Section 211 of the Economic Stabilization Act of 1970;
    - Section 5 of the Emergency Petroleum Allocation Act of 1973;
    - Section 523 of the Energy Policy and Conservation Act of 1975; and
    - Section 506(c) of the Natural Gas Policy Act of 1978
- Office of Congressional Workplace Rights

Although the Federal Circuit typically hears all appeals from any United States District Court where the original action included a complaint arising under the patent laws, the Supreme Court decided in Holmes Group, Inc. v. Vornado Air Circulation Systems, Inc. (2002) that the Federal Circuit did not have jurisdiction if the patent claims arose solely as counterclaims by the defendant. However, the force of law of Holmes ended following passage of the America Invents Act of 2011, which requires the Federal Circuit to hear all appeals where the original action included a complaint or compulsory counterclaim arising under the patent laws.

The decisions of the Federal Circuit, particularly in regard to patent cases, are unique in that they are binding precedent throughout the U.S. within the bounds of the court's subject-matter jurisdiction. This is unlike the other courts of appeals as the authority of their decisions is restricted by geographic location and thus there may be differing judicial standards depending on location. Decisions of the Federal Circuit are only superseded by decisions of the Supreme Court or by applicable changes in the law. Also, review by the Supreme Court is discretionary, so Federal Circuit decisions are often the final word, especially since there are no circuit splits given the Federal Circuit's exclusive subject-matter jurisdiction. In its first decision, the Federal Circuit incorporated as binding precedent the decisions of its predecessor courts, the United States Court of Customs and Patent Appeals and the appellate division of the United States Court of Claims.

Because the Court is one of national jurisdiction, panels from the court may sit anywhere in the country. Typically, once or twice a year, the court will hold oral arguments in a city outside of its native Washington, D.C. The panels may sit in Federal courthouses, state courthouses, or even at law schools.

== Composition ==
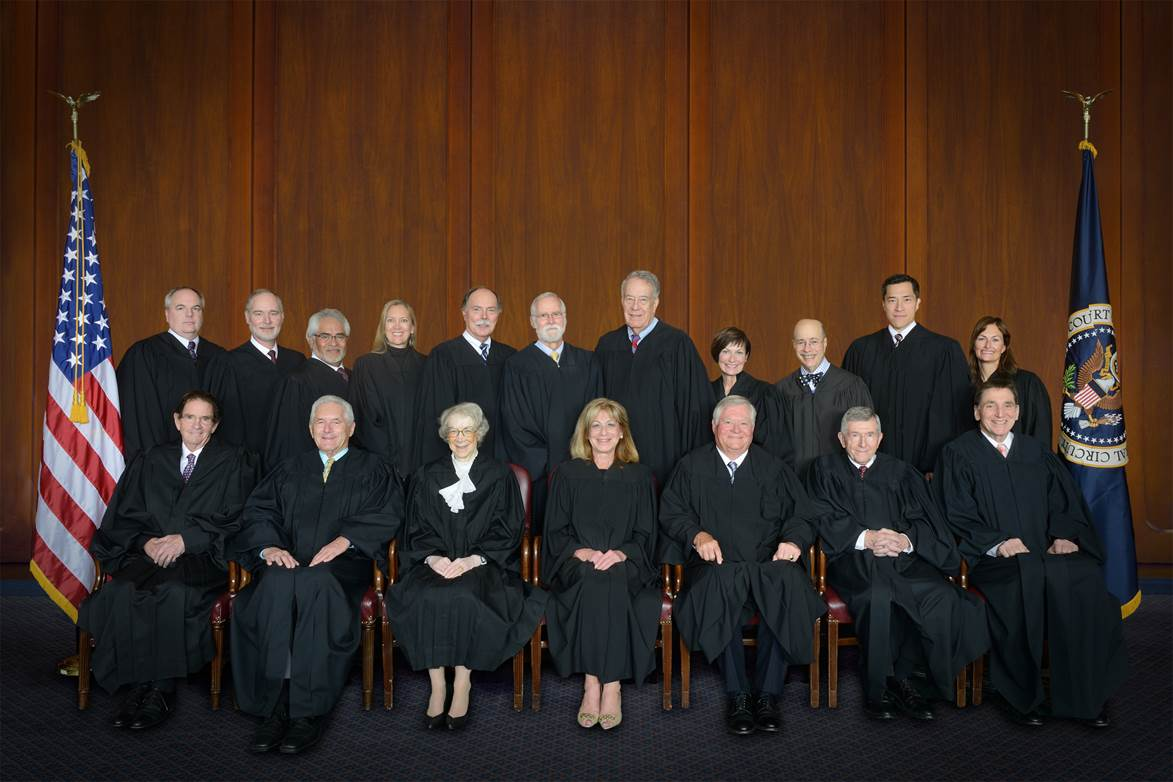
The judges of the Federal Circuit as of 2016

The Federal Circuit may have a total of 12 active circuit judges sitting at any given time, who are required to reside within 50 miles of the District of Columbia, as set by 28 U.S.C. § 44. Judges on senior status are not subject to this restriction. As with other federal judges, they are nominated by the President and must be confirmed by the Senate. Their terms last during the "good behavior" of the judges, which typically results in life tenure. When eligible, judges may elect to take senior status. This allows a senior judge to continue to serve on the court while handling fewer cases than an active service judge. Each judge in active service employs a judicial assistant and up to four law clerks, while each judge in senior status employs a judicial assistant and one law clerk.

== Composition of the court ==
As of October 2, 2026:

#	Title	Judge	Duty station	Born	Term of service			Appointed by
#	Title	Judge	Duty station	Born	Active	Chief	Senior	Appointed by
31	Chief Judge	Kimberly A. Moore	Washington, D.C.	1968	2006–present	2021–present	—	G.W. Bush
16	Circuit Judge	Pauline Newman (Note: Suspended from September 20, 2023 through August 29, 2026.)	Washington, D.C.	1927	1984–present	—	—	Reagan
22	Circuit Judge	Alan David Lourie	Washington, D.C.	1935	1990–present	—	—	G.H.W. Bush
29	Circuit Judge	Timothy B. Dyk	Washington, D.C.	1937	2000–present	—	—	Clinton
30	Circuit Judge	Sharon Prost	Washington, D.C.	1951	2001–present	2014–2021	—	G.W. Bush
33	Circuit Judge	Jimmie V. Reyna	Washington, D.C.	1952	2011–present	—	—	Obama
35	Circuit Judge	Richard G. Taranto	Washington, D.C.	1957	2013–present	—	—	Obama
36	Circuit Judge	Raymond T. Chen	Washington, D.C.	1968	2013–present	—	—	Obama
37	Circuit Judge	Todd M. Hughes	Washington, D.C.	1966	2013–present	—	—	Obama
38	Circuit Judge	Kara Farnandez Stoll	Washington, D.C.	1968	2015–present	—	—	Obama
39	Circuit Judge	Tiffany P. Cunningham	Washington, D.C.	1976	2021–present	—	—	Biden
40	Circuit Judge	Leonard P. Stark	Washington, D.C.	1969	2022–present	—	—	Biden
19	Senior Judge	Haldane Robert Mayer	Washington, D.C.	1941	1987–2010	1997–2004	2010–present	Reagan
21	Senior Judge	S. Jay Plager	Washington, D.C.	1931	1989–2000	—	2000–present	G.H.W. Bush
25	Senior Judge	Alvin Anthony Schall	Washington, D.C.	1944	1992–2009	—	2009–present	G.H.W. Bush
26	Senior Judge	William Curtis Bryson	Washington, D.C.	1945	1994–2013	—	2013–present	Clinton
28	Senior Judge	Richard Linn	Washington, D.C.	1944	1999–2012	—	2012–present	Clinton
34	Senior Judge	Evan Wallach	Washington, D.C.	1949	2011–2021	—	2021–present	Obama

== List of former judges ==
#	Judge	State	Born–died	Active service	Chief Judge	Senior status	Appointed by	Reason for termination
1	Don Nelson Laramore	IN	1906–1989	—	—	1982–1989	Eisenhower / Operation of law	death
2	Giles Rich	NY	1904–1999	1982–1999	—	—	Eisenhower / Operation of law	death
3	J. Lindsay Almond	VA	1898–1986	—	—	1982–1986	Kennedy / Operation of law	death
4	Oscar Hirsh Davis	DC	1914–1988	1982–1988	—	—	Kennedy / Operation of law	death
5	Arnold Wilson Cowen	TX	1905–2007	—	—	1982–2007	L. Johnson / Operation of law	death
6	Philip Nichols Jr.	DC	1907–1990	1982–1983	—	1983–1990	L. Johnson / Operation of law	death
7	Byron George Skelton	TX	1905–2004	—	—	1982–2004	L. Johnson / Operation of law	death
8	Phillip Baldwin	TX	1924–2002	1982–1986	—	1986–1991	L. Johnson / Operation of law	retirement
9	Howard Thomas Markey	IL	1920–2006	1982–1991	1982–1990	—	Nixon / Operation of law	retirement
10	Marion T. Bennett	MO	1914–2000	1982–1986	—	1986–2000	Nixon / Operation of law	death
11	Shiro Kashiwa	HI	1912–1998	1982–1986	—	—	Nixon / Operation of law	retirement
12	Jack Richard Miller	IA	1916–1994	1982–1985	—	1985–1994	Nixon / Operation of law	death
13	Daniel Mortimer Friedman	DC	1916–2011	1982–1989	—	1989–2011	Carter / Operation of law	death
14	Edward Samuel Smith	MD	1919–2001	1982–1989	—	1989–2001	Carter / Operation of law	death
15	Helen W. Nies	DC	1925–1996	1982–1995	1990–1994	1995–1996	Carter / Operation of law	death
17	Jean Galloway Bissell	SC	1936–1990	1984–1990	—	—	Reagan	death
18	Glenn L. Archer Jr.	DC	1929–2011	1985–1997	1994–1997	1997–2011	Reagan	death
20	Paul Redmond Michel	PA	1941–present	1988–2010	2004–2010	—	Reagan	retirement
23	Raymond C. Clevenger	DC	1937–present	1990–2006	—	2006–2026	G.H.W. Bush	retirement
24	Randall Ray Rader	VA	1949–present	1990–2014	2010–2014	—	G.H.W. Bush	retirement
27	Arthur J. Gajarsa	MD	1941–present	1997–2011	—	2011–2012	Clinton	retirement
32	Kathleen M. O'Malley	OH	1956–present	2010–2022	—	—	Obama	retirement

== Chief judges ==
Chief Judges
Markey	1982–1990
Nies	1990–1994
Archer, Jr.	1994–1997
Mayer	1997–2004
Michel	2004–2010
Rader	2010–2014
Prost	2014–2021
Moore	2021–present

Chief judges have administrative responsibilities with respect to their circuits, and preside over any panel on which they serve, unless the circuit justice (the Supreme Court justice responsible for the circuit) is also on the panel. Unlike the Supreme Court, where one justice is specifically nominated to be chief, the office of chief judge rotates among the circuit judges.

To be chief, a judge must have been in active service on the court for at least one year, be under the age of 65, and have not previously served as chief judge. A vacancy is filled by the judge highest in seniority among the group of qualified judges, with seniority determined first by commission date, then by age. The chief judge serves for a term of seven years, or until age 70, whichever occurs first. If no judge qualifies to be chief, the youngest judge over the age of 65 who has served on the court for at least one year shall act as chief until another judge qualifies. If no judge has served on the court for more than a year, the most senior judge shall act as chief. Judges can forfeit or resign their chief judgeship or acting chief judgeship while retaining their active status as a circuit judge.

When the office was created in 1948, the chief judge was the longest-serving judge who had not elected to retire, on what has since 1958 been known as senior status, or declined to serve as chief judge. After August 6, 1959, judges could not become or remain chief after turning 70 years old. The current rules have been in operation since October 1, 1982. Notwithstanding the foregoing, when the court was initially created, Congress had to resolve which chief judge of the predecessor courts would become the first chief judge. It was decided that the chief judge of the predecessor court who had the most seniority, as chief judge, would be the new chief judge. This made Howard T. Markey, former chief judge of the Court of Customs and Patent Appeals, the first chief judge.

== Succession of seats ==
The court has twelve seats for active judges, numbered in alphabetical order by their occupant at the time the court was formed, with the sole vacant seat being numbered last. Judges who retire into senior status remain on the bench but leave their seat vacant. That seat is filled by the next circuit judge appointed by the President.

Seat 1
Reassigned on October 1, 1982 from the United States Court of Customs and Patent Appeals by 96 Stat. 25
Baldwin	1982–1986
Michel	1988–2010
Taranto	2013–present

Seat 2
Reassigned on October 1, 1982 from the United States Court of Customs and Patent Appeals by 96 Stat. 25
Markey	1982–1991
Bryson	1994–2013
Hughes	2013–present

Seat 3
Reassigned on October 1, 1982 from the United States Court of Customs and Patent Appeals by 96 Stat. 25
Nies	1982–1995
Gajarsa	1997–2011
Wallach	2011–2021
Cunningham	2021–present

Seat 4
Reassigned on October 1, 1982 from the United States Court of Customs and Patent Appeals by 96 Stat. 25
Rich	1982–1999
Linn	1999–2012
Chen	2013–present

Seat 5
Reassigned on October 1, 1982 from the United States Court of Customs and Patent Appeals by 96 Stat. 25
Miller	1982–1985
Archer, Jr.	1985–1997
Dyk	2000–present

Seat 6
Reassigned on October 1, 1982 from the United States Court of Claims by 96 Stat. 25
Friedman	1982–1989
Lourie	1990–present

Seat 7
Reassigned on October 1, 1982 from the United States Court of Claims by 96 Stat. 25
Bennett	1982–1986
Mayer	1987–2010
Reyna	2011–present

Seat 8
Reassigned on October 1, 1982 from the United States Court of Claims by 96 Stat. 25
Kashiwa	1982–1986
Plager	1989–2000
Prost	2001–present

Seat 9
Reassigned on October 1, 1982 from the United States Court of Claims by 96 Stat. 25
Nichols, Jr.	1982–1983
Newman	1984–present

Seat 10
Reassigned on October 1, 1982 from the United States Court of Claims by 96 Stat. 25
Smith	1982–1989
Schall	1992–2009
O'Malley	2010–2022
Stark	2022–present

Seat 11
Reassigned on October 1, 1982 from the United States Court of Claims by 96 Stat. 25
Davis	1982–1988
Clevenger	1990–2006
Moore	2006–present

Seat 12
Reassigned on October 1, 1982 from the United States Court of Claims by 96 Stat. 25
Bissell	1984–1990
Rader	1990–2014
Stoll	2015–present

== See also ==
- Federal Circuit Bar Association
- Federal Circuit appointment history
- List of current United States circuit judges
- List of United States patent law cases
- United States Court of Federal Claims

== General references ==
- "OSCAR". Federal Law Clerk Information System. Archived from the original on April 5, 2014.
  - Source for the duty stations for senior judges
- "U. S. Court of Appeals for the Federal Circuit". History of the Federal Judiciary. Federal Judicial Center.
  - Source for the state, lifetime, term of active judgeship, term of chief judgeship, term of senior judgeship, appointer, termination reason, and seat information
