= Operation of law =

Legal term of art

The phrase "by operation of law" is a legal term that indicates that a right or liability has been created for a party, irrespective of the intent of that party, because it is dictated by existing legal principles. For example, if a person dies without a will, their heirs are determined by operation of law. Similarly, if a person marries or has a child after their will has been written, the law writes this pretermitted spouse or pretermitted heir into the will if no provision for this situation was specifically included. Adverse possession, in which title to land passes because non-owners have occupied it for a certain period of time, is another important right that vests by operation of law.

Events that occur by operation of law do so because courts have determined over time that the rights thus created or transferred represent what the intent of the party would have been, had they thought about the situation in advance; or because the results fulfilled the settled expectations of parties with respect to their property; or because legal instruments of title provide for these transfers to occur automatically on certain named contingencies.

Rights that arise by operation of law often arise by design of certain contingencies set forth in a legal instrument. If a life estate is created in a tract of land, and the person by whose life the estate is measured dies, title to the property reverts to the original grantor – or, possibly, to the grantor's legal heirs – by operation of law. Nothing needs to be put in writing to affirm that this will happen. Joint tenants with rights of survivorship create a similar situation. Joint tenants with rights of survivorship deeds are always taken in equal shares, and when one joint tenant dies, the other tenants equally acquire title by virtue of the terms of the conveyance itself, by operation of law.

Rights or liabilities created by operation of law can also be created involuntarily, because a contingency occurs for which a party has failed to plan (e.g. failure to write a will); or because a specific condition exists for a set period of time (e.g. adverse possession of property or creation of an easement; failure of a court to rule on a motion within a certain period automatically defeating the motion; failure of a party to act on a filed complaint within a certain time causing dismissal of the case); or because an existing legal relationship is invalidated, but the parties to that relationship still require a mechanism to distribute their rights (e.g. under the Uniform Commercial Code, where a contract for which both parties have performed partially is voided, the court will create a new contract based on the performance that has actually been rendered and containing reasonable terms to accommodate the expectations of the parties).

Because title to property that arises by operation of law is usually contingent upon proof of certain contingencies, and title records may not contain evidence of those contingencies, legal proceedings are sometimes required to turn title that arises by operation of law into marketable title.

== See also ==
- Ipso jure
