= List of United States Supreme Court cases, volume 77 =

Supreme Court of the United States
- Interactive map of Supreme Court of the United States
- 38°53′26″N 77°00′16″W
- Established: March 4, 1789; 236 years ago
- Location: Washington, D.C.
- Coordinates: 38°53′26″N 77°00′16″W
- Composition method: Presidential nomination with Senate confirmation
- Authorised by: Constitution of the United States, Art. III, § 1
- Judge term length: life tenure, subject to impeachment and removal
- Number of positions: 9 (by statute)
- Website: supremecourt.gov

This is a list of cases reported in volume 77 (10 Wall.) of United States Reports, decided by the Supreme Court of the United States from 1869 to 1871.

== Nominative reports ==
In 1874, the U.S. government created the United States Reports, and retroactively numbered older privately published case reports as part of the new series. As a result, cases appearing in volumes 1–90 of U.S. Reports have dual citation forms; one for the volume number of U.S. Reports, and one for the volume number of the reports named for the relevant reporter of decisions (these are called "nominative reports").

=== John William Wallace ===
Starting with the 66th volume of U.S. Reports, the Reporter of Decisions of the Supreme Court of the United States was John William Wallace. Wallace was Reporter of Decisions from 1863 to 1874, covering volumes 68 through 90 of United States Reports which correspond to volumes 1 through 23 of his Wallace's Reports. As such, the dual form of citation to, for example, is 77 U.S. (10 Wall.) 544 (1870).

Wallace's Reports were the final nominative reports for the US Supreme Court; starting with volume 91, cases were identified simply as "(volume #) U.S. (page #) (year)".

== Justices of the Supreme Court at the time of 77 U.S. (10 Wall.) ==
The Supreme Court is established by Article III, Section 1 of the Constitution of the United States, which says: "The judicial Power of the United States, shall be vested in one supreme Court . . .". The size of the Court is not specified; the Constitution leaves it to Congress to set the number of justices. Under the Judiciary Act of 1789 Congress originally fixed the number of justices at six (one chief justice and five associate justices). Since 1789 Congress has varied the size of the Court from six to seven, nine, ten, and back to nine justices (always including one chief justice).

To prevent President Andrew Johnson from appointing any justices, a hostile Congress passed the Judicial Circuits Act of 1866, eliminating three of the ten seats from the Supreme Court as they became vacant, and so potentially reducing the size of the court to seven justices. The vacancy caused by the death of Justice John Catron in 1865 had not been filled, so after Justice James Moore Wayne died in July 1867 there were eight justices left on the court at the start of the term when the cases in 77 U.S. (10 Wall.) were decided; however Justice Robert Cooper Grier resigned at the end of January 1870, temporarily reducing the Court to seven justices. Newly confirmed justices William Strong and Joseph P. Bradley joined the Court in March 1870, in the final weeks of the session. This brought the Court back to nine justices, the number set by the Judiciary Act of 1869.

=== Fluctuations in Supreme Court membership, 1864-1870 ===
Justice	Departure from the Court	Arrival on the Court	Number of active justices after his arrival or departure
Chase	-	15 December 1864	10 (the then-current statutory number)
Catron	30 May 1865	-	9 (one less than the then-current statutory number of 10)
Wayne	5 July 1867	-	8 (one more than the then-current statutory number of 7)
Grier	31 January 1870	-	7 (two less than the then-current statutory number of 9)
Strong	-	14 March 1870	8 (one less than the then-current statutory number of 9)
Bradley	-	23 March 1870	9 (the then-current statutory number)

=== Justices during at least part of the Court session reported in 77 U.S. (10 Wall.) ===
Portrait	Justice	Office	Home State	Succeeded	Date confirmed by the Senate (Vote)	Tenure on Supreme Court
	Salmon P. Chase	Chief Justice	Ohio	Roger B. Taney	December 6, 1864 (Acclamation)	December 15, 1864 – May 7, 1873 (Died)
	Samuel Nelson	Associate Justice	New York	Smith Thompson	February 14, 1845 (Acclamation)	February 27, 1845 – November 28, 1872 (Retired)
	Robert Cooper Grier	Associate Justice	Pennsylvania	Henry Baldwin	August 4, 1846 (Acclamation)	August 10, 1846 – January 31, 1870 (Retired)
	Nathan Clifford	Associate Justice	Maine	Benjamin Robbins Curtis	January 12, 1858 (26–23)	January 21, 1858 – July 25, 1881 (Died)
	Noah Haynes Swayne	Associate Justice	Ohio	John McLean	January 24, 1862 (38–1)	January 27, 1862 – January 24, 1881 (Retired)
	Samuel Freeman Miller	Associate Justice	Iowa	Peter Vivian Daniel	July 16, 1862 (Acclamation)	July 21, 1862 – October 13, 1890 (Died)
	David Davis	Associate Justice	Illinois	John Archibald Campbell	December 8, 1862 (Acclamation)	December 10, 1862 – March 4, 1877 (Resigned)
	Stephen Johnson Field	Associate Justice	California	newly created seat	March 10, 1863 (Acclamation)	May 10, 1863 – December 1, 1897 (Retired)
	William Strong	Associate Justice	Pennsylvania	Robert Cooper Grier	February 18, 1870 (No vote recorded)	March 14, 1870 – December 14, 1880 (Retired)
	Joseph P. Bradley	Associate Justice	New Jersey	newly created seat	March 21, 1870 (46–9)	March 23, 1870 – January 22, 1892 (Died)

== Notable Cases in 77 U.S. (10 Wall.) ==
=== Slaughter-House Cases ===
The Slaughter-House Cases, 77 U.S. (10 Wall.) 273 (1870) were consolidated cases pertaining to the scope of the Fourteenth Amendment to the United States Constitution. The Supreme Court held that the Privileges or Immunities Clause of the Fourteenth Amendment only protects legal rights associated with federal U.S. citizenship, but not those that pertain to state citizenship. In effect, the clause was interpreted to convey limited protection pertinent only to a small number of rights, such as the right to seek federal office. The Slaughter-House Cases essentially "gutted" the Privileges or Immunities Clause. In 1953, the American scholar Edward Samuel Corwin remarked: "Unique among constitutional provisions, the privileges and immunities clause of the Fourteenth Amendment enjoys the distinction of having been rendered a practical nullity by a single decision of the Supreme Court rendered within five years after its ratification."

== Citation style ==
Under the Judiciary Act of 1789 the federal court structure at the time comprised District Courts, which had general trial jurisdiction; Circuit Courts, which had mixed trial and appellate (from the US District Courts) jurisdiction; and the United States Supreme Court, which had appellate jurisdiction over the federal District and Circuit courts—and for certain issues over state courts. The Supreme Court also had limited original jurisdiction (i.e., in which cases could be filed directly with the Supreme Court without first having been heard by a lower federal or state court). There were one or more federal District Courts and/or Circuit Courts in each state, territory, or other geographical region.

Bluebook citation style is used for case names, citations, and jurisdictions.

- "C.C.D." = United States Circuit Court for the District of . . .
  - e.g.,"C.C.D.N.J." = United States Circuit Court for the District of New Jersey
- "D." = United States District Court for the District of . . .
  - e.g.,"D. Mass." = United States District Court for the District of Massachusetts
- "E." = Eastern; "M." = Middle; "N." = Northern; "S." = Southern; "W." = Western
  - e.g.,"C.C.S.D.N.Y." = United States Circuit Court for the Southern District of New York
  - e.g.,"M.D. Ala." = United States District Court for the Middle District of Alabama
- "Ct. Cl." = United States Court of Claims
- The abbreviation of a state's name alone indicates the highest appellate court in that state's judiciary at the time.
  - e.g.,"Pa." = Supreme Court of Pennsylvania
  - e.g.,"Me." = Supreme Judicial Court of Maine

== List of cases in 77 U.S. (10 Wall.) ==
Case Name	Page and year	Opinion of the Court	Concurring opinion(s)	Dissenting opinion(s)	Lower Court	Disposition
The Blackwall	1 (1870)	Clifford	none	none	D. Cal.	reversed
The Davis	15 (1870)	Miller	none	none	C.C.S.D.N.Y.	affirmed
McKee v. Rains	22 (1870)	Chase	none	none	C.C.D. La.	affirmed
Little v. Herndon	26 (1870)	Nelson	none	Miller	C.C.N.D. Ill.	affirmed
Bates v. Equitable Insurance Company	33 (1870)	Miller	none	none	C.C.D.R.I.	affirmed
People's Railroad v. Memphis Railroad	38 (1869)	Clifford	none	Chase	Tenn.	affirmed
Reilly v. Golding	56 (1870)	Nelson	none	none	C.C.D. La.	affirmed
Boylan v. United States	58 (1870)	Chase	none	none	C.C.D.N.Y.	affirmed
Mahoney v. United States	62 (1870)	Field	none	none	Ct. Cl.	affirmed
Texas v. Hardenberg	68 (1869)	Chase	none	none	original	decree for Tex.
Schools v. Risley	91 (1870)	Clifford	none	none	Mo.	affirmed
Stimpson v. Woodman	117 (1870)	Nelson	none	Clifford	C.C.D. Mass.	reversed
Texas v. Chiles	127 (1871)	Nelson	none	none	original	account denied
Wiggins v. Burkham	129 (1870)	Swayne	none	none	C.C.D. Ind.	affirmed
Clark v. Bousfield	133 (1870)	Nelson	none	none	C.C.N.D. Ohio	certification
Feild v. Farrington	141 (1870)	Strong	none	none	C.C.E.D. Ark.	reversed
Bank of the Republic v. Millard	152 (1870)	Davis	none	none	Sup. Ct. D.C.	reversed
Dean v. Nelson	158 (1870)	Bradley	none	none	C.C.W.D. Tenn.	modified
Downham v. City of Alexandria	173 (1870)	Field	none	none	Va. Gen. Dist. Ct.	dismissed
Memphis and Charleston Railroad Company v. Reeves	176 (1870)	Miller	none	none	C.C.W.D. Tenn.	reversed
The Lulu	192 (1870)	Clifford	none	none	C.C.D. Md.	reversed
The Kalorama	204 (1870)	Clifford	none	none	C.C.D. Md.	reversed
Braun v. Sauerwein	218 (1870)	Strong	none	none	C.C.D. Md.	affirmed
Hornsby v. United States	224 (1870)	Field	none	Davis	D. Cal.	reversed
The Columbia	246 (1870)	Strong	none	none	C.C.S.D.N.Y.	affirmed
Deming's Appeal	251 (1870)	Swayne	none	none	Ct. Cl.	reinstatement denied
New Orleans, Opelousas and Great Western Railroad v. Morgan	256 (1870)	Clifford	none	none	C.C.D. La.	dismissal denied
Deery v. Cray	263 (1870)	Miller	none	none	C.C.D. Md.	affirmed
Slaughter-House Cases	273 (1870)	Clifford	none	Bradley; Field; Swayne	La.	14th Am. limits
Washington Railroad Company v. Bradleys	299 (1870)	Swayne	none	none	Sup. Ct. D.C.	reversed
Gunnell v. Bird	304 (1870)	Bradley	none	none	Sup. Ct. D.C.	reversed
Cooper v. Reynolds	308 (1870)	Miller	none	Field	C.C.E.D. Tenn.	reversed
Smith v. Stevens	321 (1870)	Davis	none	none	Kan.	affirmed
Jones v. Andrews	327 (1870)	Bradley	none	none	C.C.W.D. Tenn.	reversed
The Farragut	334 (1870)	Bradley	none	none	C.C.S.D. Ill.	affirmed
Rutland Marble Company v. Ripley	339 (1870)	Strong	none	none	C.C.D. Vt.	reversed
Hanrick v. Neely	364 (1870)	Davis	none	none	C.C.W.D. Tex.	reversed
Philadelphia, Wilmington and Baltimore Railroad Company v. Trimble	367 (1870)	Swayne	none	Bradley	C.C.D. Md.	affirmed
Barnard v. Kellogg	383 (1871)	Davis	none	none	C.C.D. Conn.	reversed
United States v. Hodson	395 (1870)	Swayne	none	none	C.C.D. Wis.	reversed
Ducat v. City of Chicago	410 (1871)	Nelson	none	none	Ill.	affirmed
Masterson v. Herndon	416 (1870)	Miller	none	none	C.C.W.D. Tex.	dismissed
The Mabey	419 (1870)	Nelson	none	none	C.C.D.N.Y.	examination denied
Campbell v. Wilcox	421 (1871)	Field	none	none	C.C.S.D. Ohio	affirmed
United States v. Vigil	423 (1870)	Nelson	none	none	Sup. Ct. Terr. N.M.	dismissal denied
Tappan v. Beardsley	427 (1871)	Miller	none	none	C.C.S.D.N.Y.	reversed
Kimball v. Collector	436 (1870)	Clifford	none	none	C.C.D. Mass.	affirmed
The Clinton Bridge	454 (1870)	Nelson	none	none	C.C.D. Iowa	affirmed
Corbett v. Nutt	464 (1871)	Field	none	none	Va.	affirmed
Hannauer v. Woodruff	482 (1871)	Nelson	none	none	C.C.E.D. Ark.	certification
In re Paschal	483 (1871)	Bradley	none	none	not indicated	multiple
Yates v. City of Milwaukee	497 (1871)	Miller	none	none	C.C.D. Wis.	reversed
Messenger v. Mason	507 (1871)	Nelson	none	none	Iowa	dismissed
Ohio and Mississippi Railway Company v. McClure	511 (1871)	Swayne	none	none	Iowa	dismissed
Coddington v. Richardson	516 (1871)	Nelson	none	none	C.C.S.D. Ill.	affirmed
Brobst v. Brock	519 (1871)	Strong	none	none	C.C.E.D. Pa.	affirmed
Bethell v. Demaret	537 (1871)	Nelson	none	none	La.	dismissed
Ex parte Graham	541 (1871)	Swayne	none	none	D. La.	prohibition denied
City of Baltimore v. Baltimore and Ohio Railroad Company	543 (1871)	Davis	none	none	C.C.D. Md.	affirmed
Pennsylvania v. Quicksilver Mining Company	553 (1871)	Nelson	none	none	original	dismissed
The Daniel Ball	557 (1871)	Field	none	none	C.C.W.D. Mich.	affirmed
Liverpool Insurance Company v. Massachusetts	566 (1871)	Miller	Bradley	none	Mass.	affirmed
The Cotton Plant	577 (1871)	Strong	none	none	E.D. Pa.	reversed
Miller v. McKenzie	582 (1871)	Nelson	none	none	N.D. Miss.	dismissed
Stovall v. Banks	583 (1871)	Strong	none	none	N.D. Ga.	reversed
Stagg v. Connecticut Mutual Life Insurance Company	589 (1871)	Miller	none	none	C.C.D. Mo.	affirmed
Ward v. United States	593 (1871)	Davis	none	Field	Ct. Cl.	affirmed
Merchants' National Bank v. State National Bank	604 (1871)	Swayne	none	Clifford	C.C.D. Mass.	reversed
Marsh v. Fulton County	676 (1871)	Field	none	none	C.C.S.D. Ill.	affirmed

== See also ==
Certificate of division
