= Judge Gilchrist =

Judge Gilchrist may refer to:

- John Gilchrist (judge) (1809–1858), chief justice of the New Hampshire Superior Court of Judicature and a judge of the United States Court of Claims
- Robert Budd Gilchrist (1796–1856), judge of the United States District Court for the District of South Carolina
