= George Ticknor (disambiguation) =

George Ticknor (1791–1871) was an American academician and Hispanist.

George Ticknor may also refer to:

- George Ticknor (journalist) (1822–1866), American lawyer and journalist
- George Ticknor Curtis (1812–1894), American historian and lawyer

== See also ==
- George Tickner (1946–2023), American rock guitarist and songwriter
