= Isaac Blackford =

American judge (1786–1859)

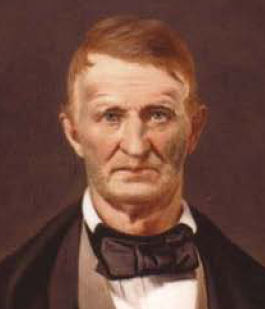
- Isaac Blackford from Who-When-What Book, 1900

Presiding Judge of the Court of Claims
- In office 1858–1859
- Preceded by: John Gilchrist
- Succeeded by: Edward G. Loring

Judge of the Court of Claims
- In office March 3, 1855 – December 31, 1859
- Appointed by: Franklin Pierce
- Preceded by: Seat established by 10 Stat. 612
- Succeeded by: James Hughes

2nd Indiana Supreme Court Chief Justice
- In office September 10, 1817 – January 3, 1853
- Preceded by: John Johnson
- Succeeded by: Andrew Davison

Speaker of the Indiana House of Representatives
- In office December 16, 1816 – December 19, 1817

Personal details
- Born: Isaac Newton Blackford; November 6, 1786 Bound Brook, New Jersey
- Died: December 31, 1859 (aged 73) Washington, D.C., U.S.
- Resting place: Crown Hill National Cemetery, Indianapolis, Indiana, Section 3, Lot 38; 39.8170356°N 86.1739432°W
- Party: Democratic-Republican; Whig
- Education: Princeton University read law

Isaac Newton Blackford (November 6, 1786 – December 31, 1859) was the second Chief Justice of the Indiana Supreme Court, the court's longest serving Justice, and among the longest serving jurists in the history of the United States. He wrote an eight-volume work entitled Blackford's Reports recording all the early decisions of the court. The books became a staple legal source among Indiana's lawyers and received national and international acclaim for their style, accuracy, quality, and concision in dealing with common law. As a jurist, Blackford was the most influential ever to serve on Indiana's courts, according to former Chief Justice of Indiana Randall Shepard. He was nicknamed the "Indiana Blackstone" because of a comment made by Washington Irving regarding the popularity of Blackford's books. During his lifetime he was nationally renowned as one of the most prominent jurists in the United States.

After graduating from Princeton University, Blackford moved to the Indiana Territory to practice law in 1812. After holding several civil service positions, he was appointed a circuit court judge but resigned just before the territorial government was dissolved in 1816. Elected as a representative to the first session of the Indiana General Assembly, he was chosen to serve as the first Speaker of the Indiana House of Representatives. Following the death of Indiana Chief Justice John Johnson in 1817, Blackford was appointed as his replacement by Governor of Indiana Jonathan Jennings. Blackford's early important cases included Polly v. Lasselle, the decision in that case freed all slaves in Indiana. Nominated without his knowledge or permission, in 1825 he was the Whig candidate for Governor of Indiana, but was defeated in the election because of his refusal to campaign publicly. Again nominated without his knowledge to become a United States senator, he lost the election in the Indiana General Assembly by only one vote.

Blackford was beset by a number of personal tragedies during the 1820s. Following the death of his wife in childbirth, his young son a few years later, his mother's death, and then narrowly escaping death himself, he became emotionally distraught. He began to live a reclusive lifestyle in a one-room apartment in the Indiana Governor's Mansion, where he remained for over twenty years. There he spent his time with only the companionship of his servant. He left for occasional meals, to attend court sessions, and rarely for business and church, but otherwise remained locked away. It was during his solitude that he began writing the reports for which he became renowned.

He was reappointed to his seat on the Supreme Court four times, serving until the adoption of the 1851 Constitution of Indiana, which made his position subject to election rather than appointment. Defeated for the Whig party nomination to run for his office, he left the court in 1852. He was defeated again in the 1853 election to become Supreme Court Reporter, which led him to seek a position on the federal courts after briefly attempting to practice law. Appointed by President Franklin Pierce, he served as a judge of the newly created Court of Claims dealing with financial claims against the federal government from 1855 until his death. During his lifetime Blackford accumulated a small fortune through the sale of his reports which was left to his only living relative, his half-sister Charlotte Teresa Coons.

== Early life ==
=== Family and background ===
Isaac Blackford was born on November 6, 1786, in Bound Brook, Somerset County, New Jersey, the only child of Joseph and Mary Straats Blackford. Joseph was a successful merchant, and had served in the New Jersey militia during the Revolutionary War. Mary was the daughter of a farmer. She had been a nurse during the American Revolutionary War and aided American soldiers during the battles of Trenton and Princeton, and continued to care for them when smallpox broke out among the army during the winter of 1780–1781. She was deeply religious, and known in the community for both her faith and patriotic zeal. Both of Blackford's parents were Presbyterian, and he remained a member of the church his entire life.

Blackford received a basic education, learning to read and write, in local public schools. His father died on May 22, 1800, leaving half his land holdings and savings of $7,220.99 ($110,113 in 2020 chained dollars) to his mother, and directing that the other half of the estate should be given to Blackford for education and as an inheritance, provided he remained obedient unto her until he reached adulthood. Mary remarried in 1801 to Thomas Coon and the couple had a child, Charlotte Teressa, on August 3, 1802. Blackford at first disliked his stepfather, but the two developed a close relationship as he grew older. The family continued to prosper, and when Blackford finally inherited his portion of his father's estate he received $5,550 ($84,632 in 2020 chained dollars). On his stepfather's advice he invested the money by granting a mortgage to earn interest.

Blackford was enrolled in Princeton University at age sixteen and graduated at the top of his class in 1806. On his enrollment forms he entered his middle name as Newton, but never again used the name during his life. Among his fifty-four classmates were John Williams Walker, James Iredell, John James Marshall, Arnold Naudain, and Patrick Noble. Blackford became fluent in Greek, Latin, and French and excelled in history and mathematics. He also spent a considerable amount of time reading legal books on English common law, especially the works of William Blackstone.

After college he studied law for a year in the office of Revolutionary War hero, Colonel George MacDonald in Bound Brook. After a year, he moved to Morristown and continued his studies in the law firm of Gabriel Ford. Ford's home had been used by George Washington as a military headquarters. Blackford boarded at Ford's home in the same room used by Washington during the war, and this was a memory he recalled fondly throughout his life. Blackford's connections brought him into contact with prominent figures during his early life. He met George Washington at age 10, and James Madison and Phillip Freneau while attending Princeton.

He completed his studies in 1810 and was admitted to the bar in New Jersey in November of that year. He took only one case of his own and realized he needed to join a law firm if he was going to be able to earn a living at his profession. He returned to his hometown and began practicing law as a member of MacDonald's firm.

=== Indiana Territory ===
In 1811 Blackford moved west. His reasons for leaving New Jersey are unclear. He had a potentially prosperous life in the east, as Ford was considering becoming a federal judge and allowing Blackford to inherit his practice. Indiana, by contrast, had just recently experienced the Battle of Tippecanoe and was still experiencing violence related to the War of 1812, and the prospect of earning a living as a lawyer on the frontier was uncertain. Despite his opportunities in New Jersey, Blackford determined to leave.

Having spent most of his funds on education, Blackford could not to afford to take the stage coach and walked from New Jersey to the Allegany River where he traveled downriver by raft to Cincinnati, Ohio and then continued on foot to Dayton, Ohio. He lived only briefly in Dayton and continued further west, moving into the Indiana Territory and first living in Brookville. He carried with him a letter of introduction to territorial Judge Isaac Dunn, a friend of George MacDonald. The letter helped him to quickly establish himself among the small legal community in the territory. Brookville was the administrative center of the eastern half of the territory, but Blackford had little chance of making a substantial income as a lawyer there, so he sought work in the civil service.

Blackford frequently moved from town to town in Indiana during his first years in the territory. He briefly traveled to Corydon in 1811 or 1812, but found no employment. He next moved to Vevay, Indiana where he took a job as cashier at a branch of the territorial Bank of Vincennes. By early 1813, he moved again to Salem where he was appointed by Governor William Henry Harrison to be clerk and recorder in the newly formed Washington County, a position he held only for a few months. The position proved disappointing to Blackford who reported that his chief responsibility was "to record marks on cattle which strayed at large in the absence of stock enclosures."

Struggling to earn enough income to support himself, Blackford continued seeking more lucrative positions. In 1813, Blackford traveled to the territorial capital, Vincennes. where he was admitted to the bar with the help of his friend John Test; he was only the thirtieth lawyer admitted to the bar in the territory. In December of the same year he was elected principal clerk for the Indiana Territory House of Representatives, which was in session in Corydon. His election to the position was owed largely to the endorsement of Isaac Dunn, who was speaker of the body. He was reelected to the position again in August 1814.

Living in Corydon, he also became a cashier again at the local branch Bank of Vincennes. He became aware of corruption at the bank which later folded in the Panic of 1819; numerous investors lost their money and scandalous abuses were revealed to the public. The experience influenced him to mistrust banks throughout his life, and led him to refuse to put any money in banks.

Governor Thomas Posey reorganized the territorial courts in 1813 creating three districts and appointing judges to preside in them. Judge Benjamin Parke was appointed to the 1st Circuit, but he resigned in 1814. Posey had become familiar with Blackford who as clerk of the House of Representatives was responsible for communications between Posey, who was residing in Jeffersonville, and the General Assembly, which was in Corydon. Posey appointed Blackford to succeed Parke as judge in the 1st Circuit Territorial Court. Blackford resigned his position as clerk and accepted Posey's appointment. The first circuit at that time was the largest in the territory and consisted of the eight western counties of the territory. There were few roads in the region at the time, and Blackford rode cross-country between settlements to hold court. He made six circuit trips during his tenure and tried forty-nine cases, and dismissed a number of others.

Statehood was granted to Indiana on December 11, 1816, and the territorial government was dissolved, including Blackford's position. Blackford renewed his license to practice law in the newly formed state, and became the first lawyer appointed to the bar in the State of Indiana.

He had moved to Vincennes during his term as judge to live centrally within his district. Upon leaving the bench, he was elected as a Democratic-Republican member to the first Indiana House of Representatives and served a one-year term from 1816 to 1817, representing Knox County. In the House he was nominated and elected first Speaker of the House. James Noble commenting on his election said, "His great fairness and unyielding integrity, to say nothing of his experience and natural fitness, won the respect and hearty good-will of us all and we could not find it in our hearts to oppose him." Although he came from the western and pro-slavery area of the state, he was in party with the anti-slavery Jennings' faction of assembly. As there was only one political party in the state at the time, the factions of the state Democratic-Republican Party vied for power. There is no record of Blackford's specific impact on any legislation, although he would have been heavily involved in laying the foundation of the state government, the framework of which was created during the first session of the assembly. Recalling Blackford's speakership, Noble went on to say that Blackford was a popular member of the body, and was supported in each of his proposals by the majority.

== Chief Justice ==
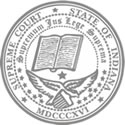
Seal of the Indiana Supreme Court

On September 10, 1817, Blackford was appointed Chief Justice of the Indiana Supreme Court by Governor Jonathan Jennings to replace Chief Justice John Johnson. Johnson had died after less than a year on the bench, and before the court had issued any decisions. Jennings informed Blackford of his decision as the two walked arm-in-arm from Johnson's grave following his funeral service. Blackford at first refused, saying he was too young and inexperienced. However, there were less than seventy lawyers in the entire state at that time, the majority of which belonged to other factions of the party, or had not lived in the state long enough to qualify for the job. Blackford was Jenning's most viable choice. Jennings and Blackford were also the only two members of the government who came from New Jersey, increasing Jennings' sentimental desire to see Blackford appointed. Despite Blackford's refusal, Jennings appointed him to the court and he was easily confirmed by the state senate to his first seven-year term.

Blackford quickly earned a reputation for being fair and impartial and is regarded as one of the most influential and pivotal members in the court's history. According to Chief Justice Randall Shepherd, he was the most important justice to have ever served on the state courts and was responsible for laying the legal foundation of the state. During his time on the three member court he wrote the majority opinion on 845 of the nearly 2300 cases he presided over. That was more than twice the number of decisions authored by any other justice in the court's history and remains a record. Seven other men served with him on the court, including James Scott, Jesse Holman, Stephen Stevens, John McKinney, Jeremiah Sullivan, Charles Dewey, Samuel Perkins, and Thomas Smith.

As Chief Justice, he was responsible for overseeing many of the day-to-day functions of the court, and oversaw the court during its move of the capitol from Corydon to Indianapolis in 1825. In 1831, due to crowding in the statehouse, the General Assembly granted the court permission to hold sessions anywhere within Indianapolis that they should choose. Blackford petitioned to have a chamber made available in the Indiana Governor's Mansion which was at that time being used for office space. He oversaw a fourth move to the new Indiana Statehouse in 1839. The court remained there for the remainder of his time on the bench.

Describing Blackford's style as a jurist, Oliver H. Smith wrote, "The principal characteristic of his mind is caution. He never guesses, He is emphatically a book judge. Declamation with him is nothing; precedent and good authority is everything." His reliance on English common law and especially precedents set by Westminster Hall, was unique compared to other frontier states. Chancellor Kent commented that "It is an interesting fact to find not only the lex mercatoria of English common law, but the refinements of the English equity system, adopted and enforced in the State of Indiana as early as 1820, when we consider how recently that country had then risen from a wilderness into a cultivated and civilized community."

=== Prominent cases ===
Among the many cases Blackford presided over was the 1820 case of Polly v. Lasselle, in which he retroactively applied the state constitution's ban on slavery which freed all slaves in Indiana.

Among his most important and impacting decisions was the case of State v. Tipton which severely limited the ability to appeal decisions to higher courts, but significantly decreased the Supreme Court's caseload. Under the original state constitution, Indiana had no appeals court, and all appeals from the circuit courts came directly to the Supreme Court. In the decision, Blackford wrote, "Courts of record have exclusive control over charges for contempt, and their conviction or acquittal is final and conclusive. This great power is intrusted to these tribunals of justice for the support and preservation of their respectability and independence; it has existed from the earliest period to which the annals of jurisdiction extend, and, except in a few cases of party violence, it has been sanctioned and established by the experience of ages." The decision was recognized as precedent in Indiana for 49 years. It was valid until Judge Buskirk investigated the precedent Blackford cited and discovered the underlying decision (Lord Mayor of London, 3 Wils. 188) was "not at all in point, while the whole current of modern decisions was in favor of appeal and review."

In Deming v. Bullit Blackford ruled that parties could cancel contracts of sale even after payment was made, provided they refunded the fees. Blackford eventually overruled his own precedent in the case of Cunningham v. Flinn. In Shanklin v. Cooper he ruled that contracts made in Indiana regarding assets outside of the state were still under Indiana's judicial jurisdiction, although he ruled to overturn his own precedent in the case of Hunt v. Standart. Because Indiana as a new state had a very limited civil and criminal code during the nineteenth century, Blackford relied heavily on English common law treatises to base his own decisions on, including Coke's Reports and Blackstone's Commentaries. During his lifetime, he amassed a personal library with nearly 2,000 volumes of legal works.

=== Personal tragedies ===
George MacDonald, under whom Blackford had studied law, left his law practice in the east and moved to the Indiana in 1818. Blackford began courting his daughter Caroline, who was fourteen years younger than himself. They were married on December 23, 1819, in Vincennes by Reverend Samuel T. Scott. Caroline wished to entertain and enjoyed the high society that Blackford's position brought, while Blackford preferred to live reclusively. Their brief marriage was strained because of the age difference. They had one son, George, born on May 3, 1821. Caroline died in childbirth, a shock from which Blackford never fully recovered and which led him to become very protective and invested in his son. Blackford wrote to his mother of his unhappiness in marriage, and, after his wife's death, he vowed to never marry again.

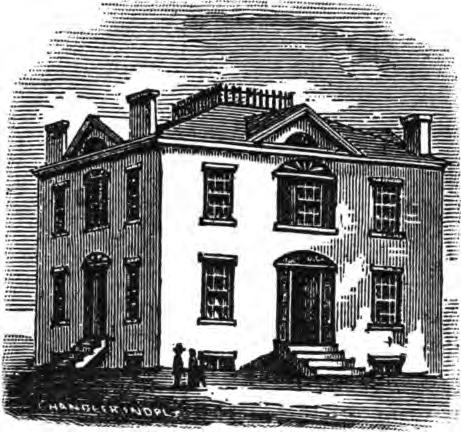
Sketch of the Indiana Governor's Mansion where Blackford lived for over twenty years.

Blackford's son became ill, probably with malaria, the date and details of the sickness are unknown. Blackford took him to Lexington, Kentucky for medical treatment, but he died only a short time later. George died sometime before 1827, and would have been under six years old. The year of George Blackford's death is uncertain because Blackford was so distraught by the event that he refused to speak about the incident with anyone for the rest of his life. The death was an emotional blow to Blackford. Burying his son in Kentucky, he returned to Vincennes where he arrived in the night and entered the home of his friend John Coburn. He lay on the floor and wept till morning. He then locked himself away for two weeks in a room in Coburn's home, never speaking and only coming out to receive a meal. Blackford continued to keep his residence in Vincennes until 1830. Afterwards, he sold his Vincennes estate and invested the money in land, and moved to Indianapolis.

The General Assembly had granted boarding rooms in the Indiana Governor's Mansion for the Supreme Court Justices to use while in Indianapolis. Blackford left Vincennes and moved into his room in the mansion. He hired a servant, William Franklin, who was the child of emancipated slaves, to bring him meals and clean his room. Due in large part to his emotional distress, Blackford began a hermit's lifestyle that he continued for twenty years. Franklin became Blackford's closest friend and remained with him throughout his life. (Note: Franklin lived until 1888 and Blackford's biography by William Thornton was based in large part on his recounting of Blackford's life. (Thornton, p. 31))

In 1827, Blackford's mother died on August 18. Blackford shut himself away for six months and even stopped attending court sessions. He obtained a lock of her hair and carried it with him for the remainder of his life. Shortly thereafter while returning to Indianapolis after attending business in Vincennes, he attempted to ford the swollen White River on his horse as he neared Martinsville. The river proved to be too swift and he and his horse were swept away. He was able to catch himself on an island, but was unable to escape it. He remained there for two days without food before he was discovered by a farmer and was rescued. He was taken to his apartment where he was nursed by Franklin until his health recovered.

=== Blackford's Reports ===
Blackford's salary began at $600 annually, and the constitution prevented it from decreasing during his term. At the time the salary was enough to sustain only a meager lifestyle. He invested some of his savings in land speculation around the state and made a large profit from his initial investment. He used the earnings to buy three city blocks in Indianapolis shortly after the city was platted in 1824. On one block he had a four-story brick building constructed during the late 1820s and he rented office space for income. By the 1830s his rental income was enough to sustain his lifestyle, and he no longer needed his judicial salary, which he chose to leave in the state treasury to draw interest at 6% per annum. By the time he left office, he was earning $1,500 annually from the state, and in total earned an estimated $50,000, including interest, during his time in office. ($1,555,400 in 2020 chained dollars) He was reportedly very frugal with his money and amassed a small fortune during his lifetime, leaving an estate of $250,000 ($6,943,750 in 2020 chained dollars) when he died.

In the early days, court decisions were few. In 1816, the court made no decisions, in 1817 two cases, and in 1818 only three. But as case volume began to increase in 1822, Blackford became aware of the problems presented by having no reporter of the decisions. He began maintaining a personal collection of the Supreme Court decisions in hopes the Indiana General Assembly would eventually authorize funds to create an official report.

After his personal tragedies while he remained locked in his room, Blackford began working on a book to report the important decisions of the Supreme Court and provide a legal source to state lawyers and judges. He was meticulous and precise in his writing. Biographer William Thornton attributed his ability to write concisely to the fact that he never practiced law extensively, and never developed the habit of writing lengthy arguments, but instead kept his thoughts clear and precise. Each volume he authored covered a decade of court decisions and was published four years after the decade was complete. So careful was Blackford in ensuring the quality and accuracy of the work that he regularly held up printing to make corrections found after a few volumes were printed, and after they were printed, if an error was reported, he would destroy the existing copies and have new ones made. He used his own savings to have the books published with the intention of selling them to lawyers in Indiana. The sale of the books brought Blackford a substantial income, and he earned between $1,500 and $2,000 annually on royalties.

Blackford's Reports were thorough and detailed thanks to Blackford's effort to keep them accurate. His reputation for accuracy became well known. On one occasion a lawyer arguing before the court seeking to delay a decision questioned Blackford on the spelling of the word "jenny", a female donkey, a word he knew would be in the report. Blackford responded with the spelling and lawyer again questioned him if he was certain that word was not spelled "jennie". Not wanting to be hasty and enter an incorrectly spelled word onto the record, Blackford delayed the decision for two days while experts were consulted as to the proper spelling. By the time the answer had come the court session had ended and decision was delayed for several months.

Blackford published the first of his eight volumes of Blackford's Reports in 1830, covering court cases between 1816 and 1826. It was immediately in demand among the state's judicial establishment as there were at that time no other readily available sources for Supreme Court decisions. The Indiana General Assembly later approved and funded the publishing of the two-volume Indiana Reports, which was authored by the court reporter and reported the entirety of the decisions of the Supreme Court. Blackford's Reports still remained more popular because of their superior style and quality. His reports were noted by readers for their concision, accuracy, and diction. They soon became popular in other US states where common law was used. Within a decade his reports had spread internationally; his reports were published in Britain and Canada where they were used as a legal resource.

Evidencing the popularity of his reports, Washington Irving, while serving as a United States diplomat to the United Kingdom at the Court of St. James's, wrote to his superiors in Washington D.C. requesting information on Blackford. He reported that Blackford's Reports were well known in Westminster and regularly used by the judiciary, and Irving compared him to William Blackstone. The attribution stuck with Blackford, and earned him the nickname "Indiana Blackstone". His reports by then had become a staple in law schools and a necessity in most law firms in the United States.

Between the time the books were published, and until 1930, his reports were cited in court decisions over 4,000 times by Indiana courts, over 3,000 times in other US state courts, over 1,400 times by federal courts and the United States Supreme Court, more than 350 times in Canadian courts, and more than 75 in British courts. Additionally, his decisions were cited over 400 times from Indiana Reports. The use of his reports in law schools became less common beginning in the early 1900s as many states' civil codes began to become more developed and reliance on common law was less frequent. His reports, however, remain a regularly used tool in cases where common law is still applied.

Blackford was a trustee for Indiana College (now Indiana University Bloomington) from 1838 to 1841. During that time the college published his reports on their printing press.

=== Appointments & electoral failures ===
In 1825 Blackford was nominated, without his knowledge, as the Whig candidate for governor of Indiana. Because of his position on the courts, he refused to campaign on his own behalf against his opponent. In the election he was defeated by James B. Ray with 13,140 votes to his 10,418. The following year, he was nominated for a United States Senate seat, again without his knowledge. He lost in the Indiana General Assembly by one vote and was defeated by former governor William Hendricks.

Blackford never sought political office while he was on the court, but his political opinions were not concealed. In 1824 he was an elector on the ticket for John Adams, and in 1832 he voted for and publicly supported Henry Clay. In 1836 he backed Martin Van Buren, primarily because he opposed Andrew Jackson. He was also opposed to the election of William Henry Harrison as president, who had been governor of the Indiana territory when he had first moved; his opposition stemmed from his experience with his style of governing and support of slavery. Although he made political positions known, he did not take part in campaigning, stumping, or party leadership.

Governor Ray reappointed Blackford as chief justice in 1826 in an attempt to win electoral support from the Whigs on a number of laws he was advocating for passage. Blackford was reappointed again in 1833 by Governor Noah Noble and in 1840 by Samuel Bigger who were both of same party as Blackford. Democratic Governor Whitcomb at first refused to reappoint Blackford because of his age in 1847. He nominated four different replacements for Blackford but the Indiana Senate refused to confirm them, forcing Whitcomb to give in and reappoint Blackford. Whitcomb likewise had refused to reappoint the other two members of the court, leaving Blackford as the only justice on the court for nearly a year while the governor wrangled with the General Assembly over the issue. In both 1826 and 1847, Blackford was the only member of the court to be reappointed, based largely on his popularity and the fame of his reports. His fellow court members had been ejected because of their age, or their slow pace in making decision.

In his later years on the court, the docket began to increase dramatically and the court was unable to keep pace with the caseload. The Blackford court's inability to keep up took a toll on his reputation, as some state leaders blamed his age as the cause of the backlog. The growing state was in need of an appeals court, and it would be created by the new Constitution of 1851. Another significant change was the passage of the state's Practice Act which broke down many common law precedents and significantly changed the methods of pleading that Blackford was accustomed to.

Blackford continued serving on the Supreme Court until the new state Constitution of 1851 made the position of justice an elected office. He sought the nomination at the Whig convention to run to keep his seat, but his lack of political experience led to his defeat. In total he had been on the Supreme Court for over thirty-five years, seven and a half years longer than any other justice in state history. As late as 1930, he remained the longest serving jurist in any position in the United States, with 12,899 days of service on the court.

== Later years ==
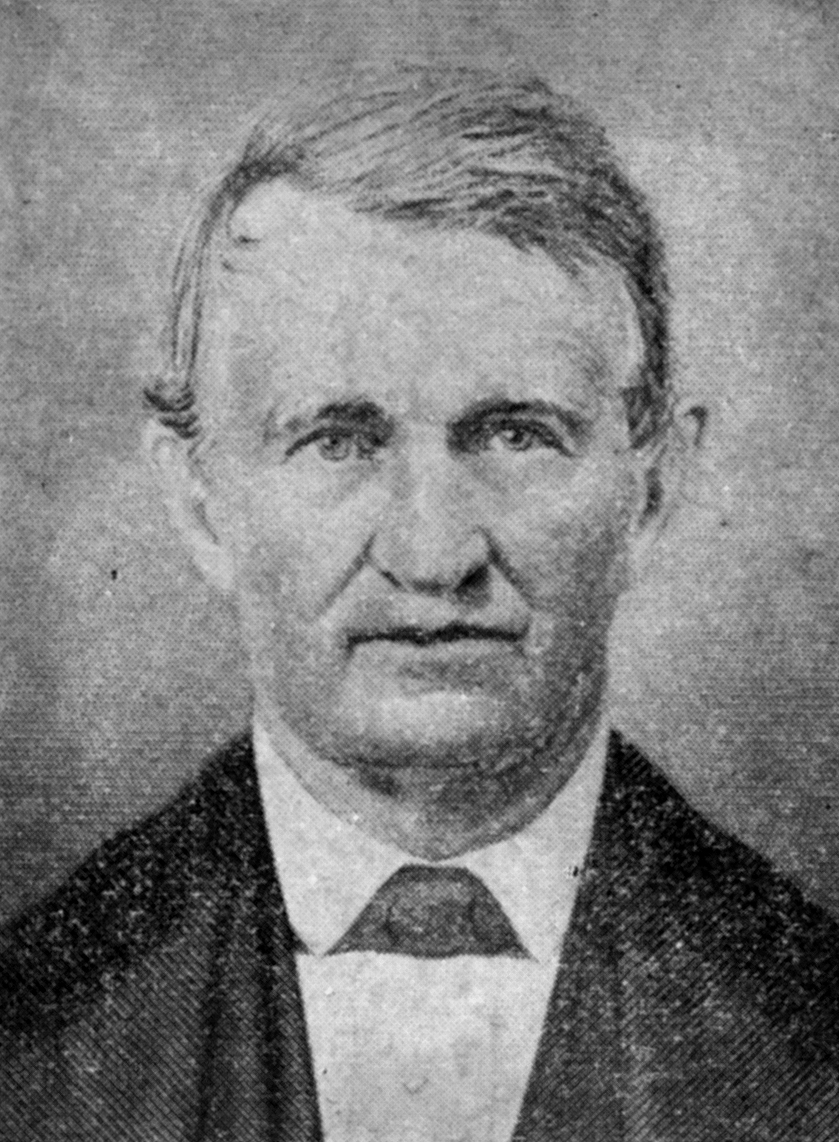
Isaac Blackford in a pencil portrait

Blackford still desired to be associated with the court so he could write the court reports. He was successfully nominated to run for the position of court reporter on the Whig ticket in 1853, but was defeated in the election by future Vice President of the United States Thomas Hendricks. After being defeated in his second election attempt after leaving the court, he briefly returned to private life. In 1854, he sought the nomination to run for Congress, but he lost the Democratic Party primary, again to Thomas Hendricks. Instead the party nominated him to run for the Indiana Senate, but he was defeated in the general election by the a People's Party candidate; The people's party subsequently merged with the newly formed Republican Party.

He opened a law office and took on one case which he argued before Judge David Wallace. He stumbled in making his arguments as he was unaccustomed to speaking publicly and he lost the case. He found the change of position embarrassing and was occasionally offended by the public and the court system for not showing him what he considered due respect. After the loss of his case he closed his law office.

=== Federal judicial service ===
With the aid of his friends, he sought to return to the bench. He had already become nationally renowned for his reports, and his availability to become a federal judge was reported to President Franklin Pierce. Congress created the Court of Claims (later the United States Court of Claims) to sit in Washington, D.C. in 1855. Blackford was nominated by President Pierce, who remarked that there was no better qualified candidate in the nation, on March 3, 1855, to the Court of Claims, to a new seat authorized by 10 Stat. 612. He was confirmed by the United States Senate on March 3, 1855, and received his commission the same day. He served as Presiding Judge from 1858 to 1859. The business of the court focused on financial claims against the government and was created as an investigative and deliberative body to help the Congress determine the validity of the claims and to lighten their workload. Given the type of cases dealt with, the decisions of the court received little attention and were primarily advisory in nature, recommending that Congress pay or not pay on the various claims. His service terminated on December 31, 1859, due to his death in Washington, D.C.

=== Death and legacy ===
Blackford's remains were returned to Indiana where he lay in state in the chambers of the Indiana Senate in Indianapolis, and the Indiana General Assembly passed resolutions honoring and celebrating his contributions to Indiana. His bier was attended by thousands of citizens and numerous dignitaries. He was buried in Greenwood Cemetery on the edge of Indianapolis. In 1866 his remains were disinterred and were reburied at Crown Hill Cemetery, Indianapolis, Indiana. There a 10 feet (3.0 m) high marble monument was erected over his grave in his honor. His entire estate was left to his half-sister Charlotte Teresa Coons and was worth an estimated $250,000 ($7,200,926 in 2020 chained dollars).

In 1915 a large oil painting of Blackford was donated to the Indiana Supreme Court, but was subsequently lost during a refurbishing of the Supreme Court offices. A search for the painting was undertaken, and it was rediscovered in 1958 and is hung prominently in the Indiana Supreme Court conference chambers.

Blackford County, Indiana was named in honor of Justice Blackford in 1838. Multiple buildings at Purdue University are named in his honor. During his lifetime he became known as the "Indiana Blackstone" because of his renown for Blackford's Reports. His reports remained in popular use many years after his death. Supreme Court librarian, circuit court judge, and historian William Wheeler Thornton states that after Blackford left the Indiana Supreme Court, and once the position was made elective, the prestige of the court that had been built up by Blackford was gradually lost as it became more political and less judicial. It was not until 1971 that the court position was again made appointive. Current Indiana Supreme Court Chief Justice Randall Shepard described Blackford as the "leading figure in shaping Indiana's judiciary." Blackford remains among the longest serving jurists is United States history, having spent 12,899 days as Chief justice, 1,764 on the Court of Claims, and 1,060 as an Indiana Territory Circuit Court judge, Blackford served a total 15,723 as a jurist.

== Electoral history ==
Indiana gubernatorial election, 1825
Party	Candidate	Votes	%
Independent	James B. Ray	13,140	55.8
Whig	Isaac Blackford	10,418	44.2

United States Senate election, 1826
Party	Candidate	Votes	%
National Republican	William Hendricks	30	48.3
Independent	Isaac Blackford	29	46.7
National Republican	Jonathan Jennings	3	4.8

== Bibliography ==
- Alexander, D.S. (1881). The Southern Law Review. Vol. VI, pages 907-928. St. Louis: G.I. Jones and Company.
- Congressional Quarterly's Guide to U.S. Elections. Congressional Quarterly Inc. 1976. ISBN 0-87187-072-X.
- Dunn, Jacob Piatt (1919). Indiana and Indianans. American Historical Society.
- Gugin, Linda C.; St. Clair, James E., eds. (2006). The Governors of Indiana. Indianapolis, Indiana: Indiana Historical Society Press. ISBN 0-87195-196-7.
- Gugin, Linda C.; St. Clair, James E., eds. (2010). Justices of the Indiana Supreme Court. Indianapolis, Indiana: Indiana Historical Society Press. ISBN 978-0-87195-288-2.
- Honeyman, A. Van Doren, ed. (1916). A Famous Western Jurist, A Native of Somerset. Somerville, New Jersey: Somerset County Historical Quarterly.
- Osborn, Elizabeth (2008). Isaac Blackford: Dedicated to Indiana & to Justice. Indiana Supreme Court.
- Thornton, William W (2005). Isaac Blackford: The Indiana Blackstone. Indiana Historical Bureau.
- Funk, Arville L (1983) [1969]. Sketchbook of Indiana History. Rochester, Indiana: Christian Book Press.
- Vile, John R. (2003). Great American Judges:An Encyclopedia. ABC-CLIO. ISBN 1-57607-989-9.

Party political offices
First	Whig nominee for Governor of Indiana; 1825	Succeeded by Israel T. Branby
Legal offices
Preceded by Seat established by 10 Stat. 612	Judge of the Court of Claims; 1855–1859	Succeeded by James Hughes
Preceded by John Gilchrist	Presiding Judge of the Court of Claims; 1858–1859	Succeeded by Edward G. Loring
