= The Daniel Ball =

- Supreme Court of the United States

Decided December 1, 1870
- Full case name: The Daniel Ball
- Citations: 77 U.S. 557 (more) 10 Wall. 557

Holding
- Bodies of water that are "navigable in fact" are considered navigable for legal purposes.

Court membership
- Chief Justice Salmon P. Chase Associate Justices Samuel Nelson · Nathan Clifford; Noah H. Swayne · Samuel F. Miller; David Davis · Stephen J. Field; William Strong · Joseph P. Bradley

Case opinion
- Majority: Field, joined by unanimous

The Daniel Ball, 77 U.S. 557 (1870), was a United States Supreme Court case concerning whether a given body of water was navigable. The Court's majority opinion, written by Justice Stephen J. Field, held that bodies of water that are "navigable in fact" are considered navigable for legal purposes. This holding contradicted existing British common law, which had defined navigability based on the ebb and flow of the tides.

The case originated in a dispute regarding a ship named the Daniel Ball, a steamboat that had been traveling on the Grand River in Michigan between the cities of Grand Rapids and Grand Haven. The owners of the ship were sued by the government of the United States for violating a federal law requiring ships to have a license in order to transport people or cargo on the "navigable waters of the United States".

The Daniel Ball also held that rivers are "navigable in fact" when they are used or are capable of being used for commerce, either between states within the United States or between foreign countries. This case is most often cited for its definition of the navigable Waters of the United States.
