= William Tod Otto =

American judge

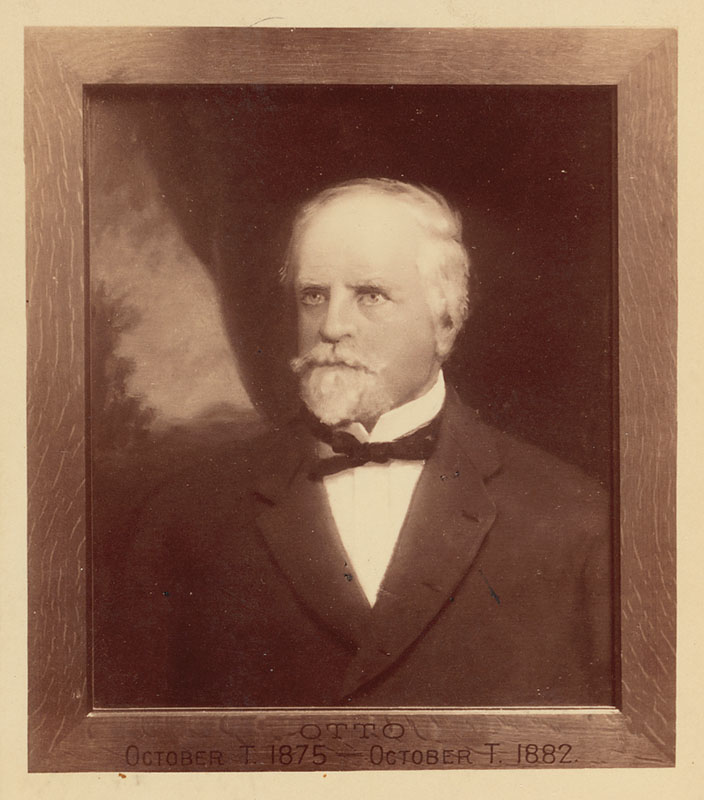
William Tod Otto

William Tod Otto (January 19, 1816 – November 7, 1905) was an American judge and the eighth reporter of decisions of the United States Supreme Court, serving as reporter from 1875 to 1883.

== Early life, family and education ==
Born in Philadelphia, he was the son of noted physician John Conrad Otto. William's great-grandfather was Revolutionary War Army Surgeon Bodo Otto, who had three sons that were also surgeons and assisted him during wartime.

William earned his A.B. in 1833 and his A.M. in 1836, both from the University of Pennsylvania, and then read law with Joseph R. Ingersoll.

== Career ==
Otto moved west and practiced law in Brownstown, Indiana. He became a judge on the Indiana Second Circuit Court from 1844 to 1852. He taught law at a predecessor school of the now Indiana University Maurer School of Law from 1847 to 1852. He unsuccessfully ran for Attorney General of Indiana in 1858.

Otto was a personal friend of fellow Indiana attorney Abraham Lincoln. Judge Otto headed the Indiana delegation to the 1860 Republican National Convention that nominated Lincoln for the presidency. Subsequently, Otto was among those instrumental in delivering Indiana, a key swing state, to Lincoln in the presidential election. Lincoln appointed him Assistant Secretary of the Interior after the previous man in the position, John Palmer Usher, was promoted to Secretary of the Interior. Anticipating the outbreak of southern hostilities, Lincoln wanted Otto to be involved in military organization. He served in the Interior Department from 1863 to 1871. According to The New York Times, Judge Otto was among those surrounding Lincoln's bedside when the President died after being shot by John Wilkes Booth.

Otto later served as a diplomat, helping arbitrate claims against Spain, as well as a delegate to the Universal Postal Union congress in Lisbon, Portugal. In 1875, he was named Reporter of Decisions of the Supreme Court of the United States, a position he held until 1883.

Legal offices
Preceded by John William Wallace	United States Supreme Court Reporter of Decisions; 1875 – 1883	Succeeded by Bancroft Davis
