= Henry Putzel Jr. =

American lawyer

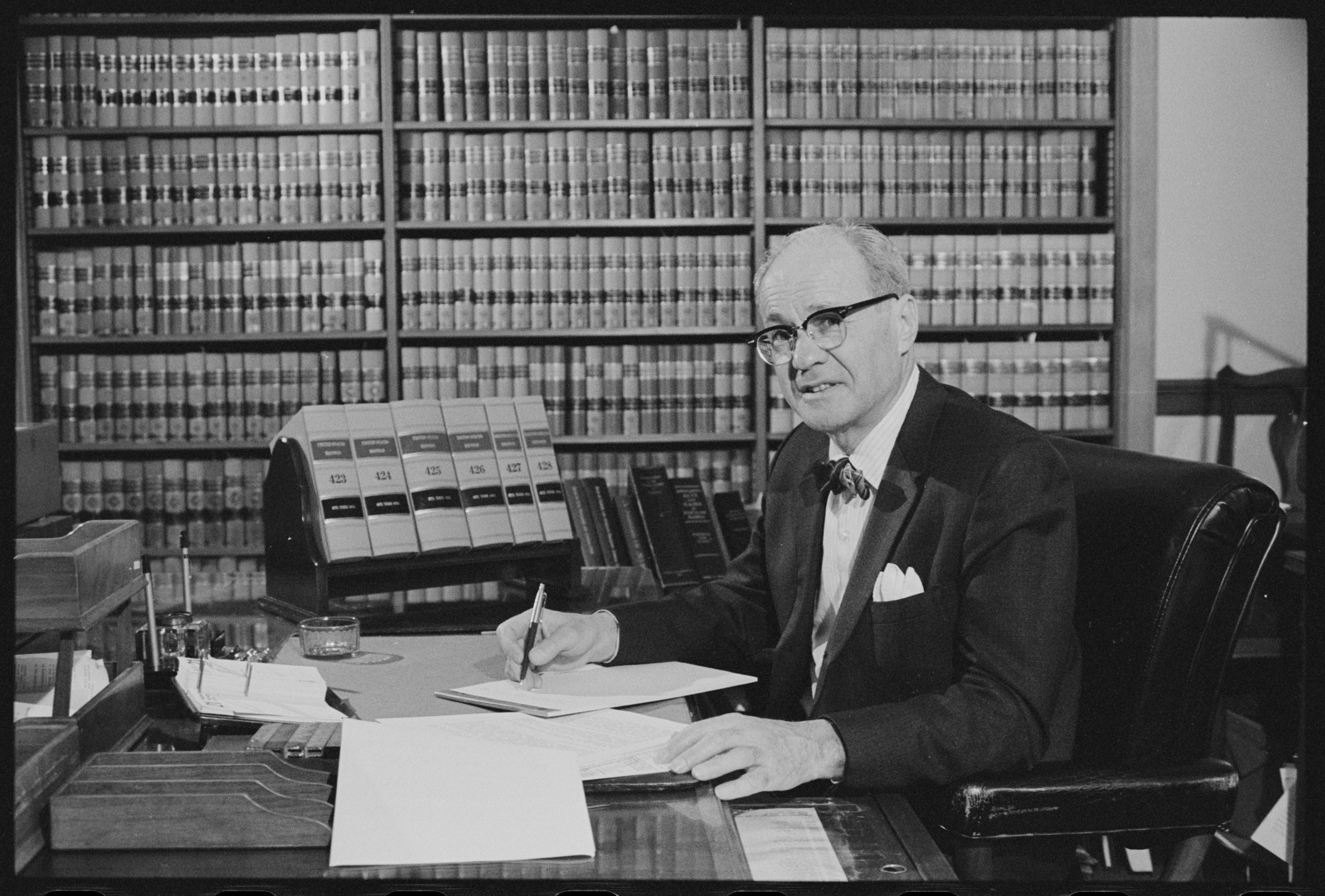
- Putzel in 1979

13th Reporter of Decisions of the Supreme Court of the United States
- In office 1964–1979
- Preceded by: Walter Wyatt
- Succeeded by: Henry Curtis Lind

Personal details
- Born: October 8, 1913 Denver, Colorado, U.S.
- Died: September 2, 2013 (aged 99) Peterborough, New Hampshire, U.S.
- Education: Yale University (BA)
- Profession: Lawyer

Henry Putzel Jr. (October 8, 1913 – September 2, 2013) was an American lawyer and the thirteenth Reporter of Decisions of the United States Supreme Court, serving from 1964 to 1979.

Born in Denver, Colorado, he received his B.A. from Yale University in 1935 and his law degree from Yale in 1938. He practiced law in St. Louis, Missouri from 1938 to 1941. During World War II, he worked for the Federal government at the Office of Price Administration (1942–1945) and the United States Department of Justice's Foreign Agents Registration Section (1945–1948). At Justice he also worked on desegregation and civil rights cases in the Civil Rights Division where he was eventually head of the Elections Section prior to being recommended to Chief Justice Earl Warren for the position of reporter of decisions.

Putzel said the ideal reporter must be a lawyer, a "word nut", and a "double revolving peripatetic nit-picker."

Putzel died in Peterborough, New Hampshire on September 2, 2013, at the age of 99.

Legal offices
Preceded by Walter Wyatt	United States Supreme Court Reporter of Decisions; 1964 – 1979	Succeeded by Henry Curtis Lind
