= Ernest Knaebel =

American lawyer

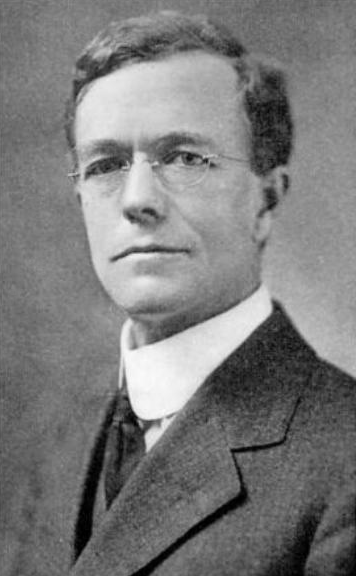

Supreme Court of the United States Reporter of Decisions
- In office 1916–1944

Personal details
- Born: June 14, 1872 Manhasset, New York, US
- Died: February 19, 1947 (aged 74) West Boxford, Massachusetts, US
- Education: Yale University
- Occupation: Lawyer

Ernest Knaebel (June 14, 1872 – February 19, 1947) was an American lawyer and the eleventh reporter of decisions of the United States Supreme Court, serving from 1916 to 1944. He retired on January 31, 1944, because of ill health, dying three years later.

== Biography ==
Ernest Knaebel was born in Manhasset, New York on June 14, 1872. He was a graduate of Yale University, receiving his A.B. in 1894, his LL.B. in 1896, and his LL.M. in 1897. He practiced law in New York City in 1898 but soon moved to Denver, Colorado. He practiced law there until 1902, when he was named United States Attorney, serving until 1907. In that year he went to Washington, D.C., where he was a special assistant to the United States Attorney General until 1911 and then Assistant Attorney General from 1911 to 1916. While at the United States Department of Justice, he specialized in cases involving the public lands and Indian matters. He became reporter in 1916 and during his tenure, the Government Printing Office took over publication of the United States Reports; previously private printers had issued them.

He died at his sister-in-law's home in West Boxford, Massachusetts on February 19, 1947.

Some of Knaebel's official correspondence and other personal papers are housed with the Knaebel Family Papers collection at the American Heritage Center of the University of Wyoming and available for research.

Legal offices
Preceded by Charles Henry Butler	United States Supreme Court Reporter of Decisions; 1915 – 1944	Succeeded by Walter Wyatt
