= Christine Luchok Fallon =

American lawyer (born 1952)

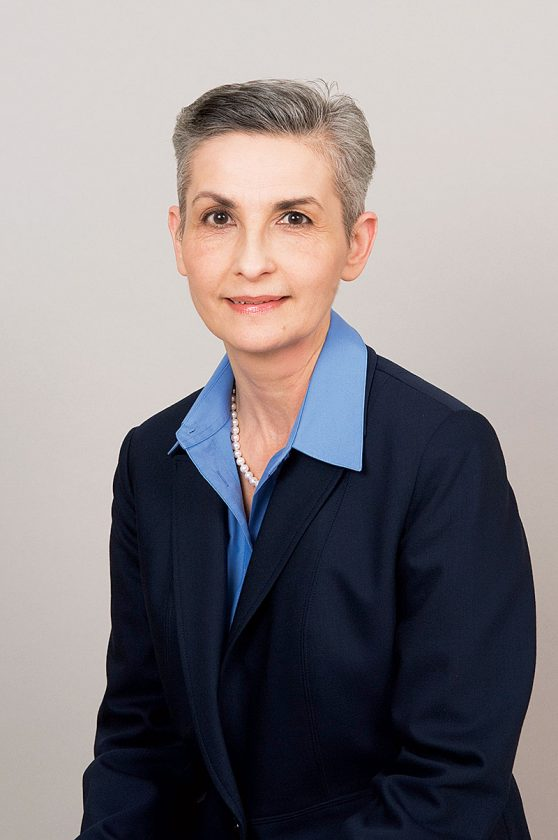

16th Reporter of Decisions of the United States Supreme Court
- In office March 3, 2011 – September 25, 2020
- Preceded by: Frank Wagner
- Succeeded by: Rebecca Anne Womeldorf

Personal details
- Born: Christine Anne Luchok; November 17, 1952 (age 73) Morgantown, West Virginia
- Education: West Virginia University (BA); Catholic University (JD)

Christine Anne Luchok Fallon (born November 17, 1952) is an American lawyer. She served as the 16th Reporter of Decisions of the United States Supreme Court. Fallon began her service in 2011 and retired in September 2020. She is the first woman to hold the position.

== Education ==
Fallon earned her bachelor's degree from West Virginia University in 1974, graduating magna cum laude. She earned her J.D. from the Columbus School of Law at the Catholic University of America in 1977.

== Career ==
=== Early law career ===
Fallon practiced law in Pittsburgh, Pennsylvania, and Tallahassee, Florida. From 1982 to 1989, Fallon served as a legal editor at the Research Institute of America in Washington, D.C., where she supervised seven attorneys.

=== Deputy Reporter of Decisions ===
Fallon served as the Supreme Court's Deputy Reporter of Decisions from February 1989 until March 2011. She wrote syllabi and edited the opinions of the Court for release and publication in the United States Reports.

=== Reporter of Decisions ===
In March 2011, Fallon was promoted to the Supreme Court's Reporter of Decisions. She was the first woman to hold the position since its establishment in 1790. Over the course of her career, she worked on many cases, including Bush v. Gore and National Federation of Independent Business v. Sebelius, which upheld the Affordable Care Act.

On July 7, 2020, the Supreme Court announced that Fallon would retire as the Reporter of Decisions, effective September 25, 2020, after 11 years in the role and 31 total years working for the Court. Her successor was announced as Rebecca Anne Womeldorf.

=== Organizational memberships ===
Fallon has been active in the Association of Reporters of Judicial Decisions, having served as president, vice president, and secretary.

Legal offices
Preceded by Frank Wagner	Reporter of Decisions of the United States Supreme Court; 2011–2020	Succeeded by Rebecca Anne Womeldorf
