= List of federal judges appointed by Franklin Pierce =

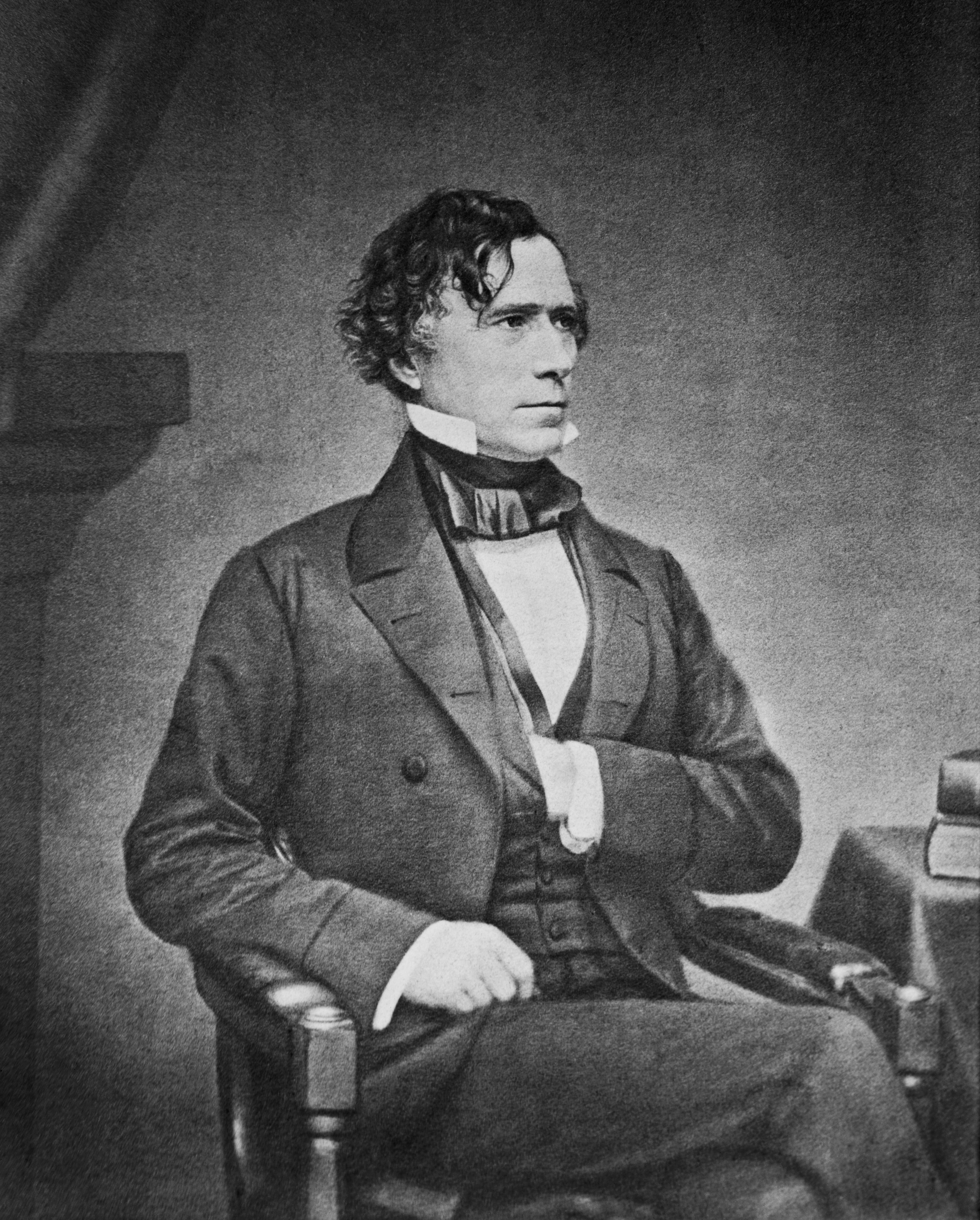
Franklin Pierce.

Following is a list of all Article III United States federal judges appointed by President Franklin Pierce during his presidency. In total Pierce appointed 16 Article III federal judges, including 1 Justice to the Supreme Court of the United States, 3 judges to the United States circuit courts, and 12 judges to the United States district courts.

Pierce was also the first president to appoint judges, 3 total, to the United States Court of Claims, an Article I tribunal.

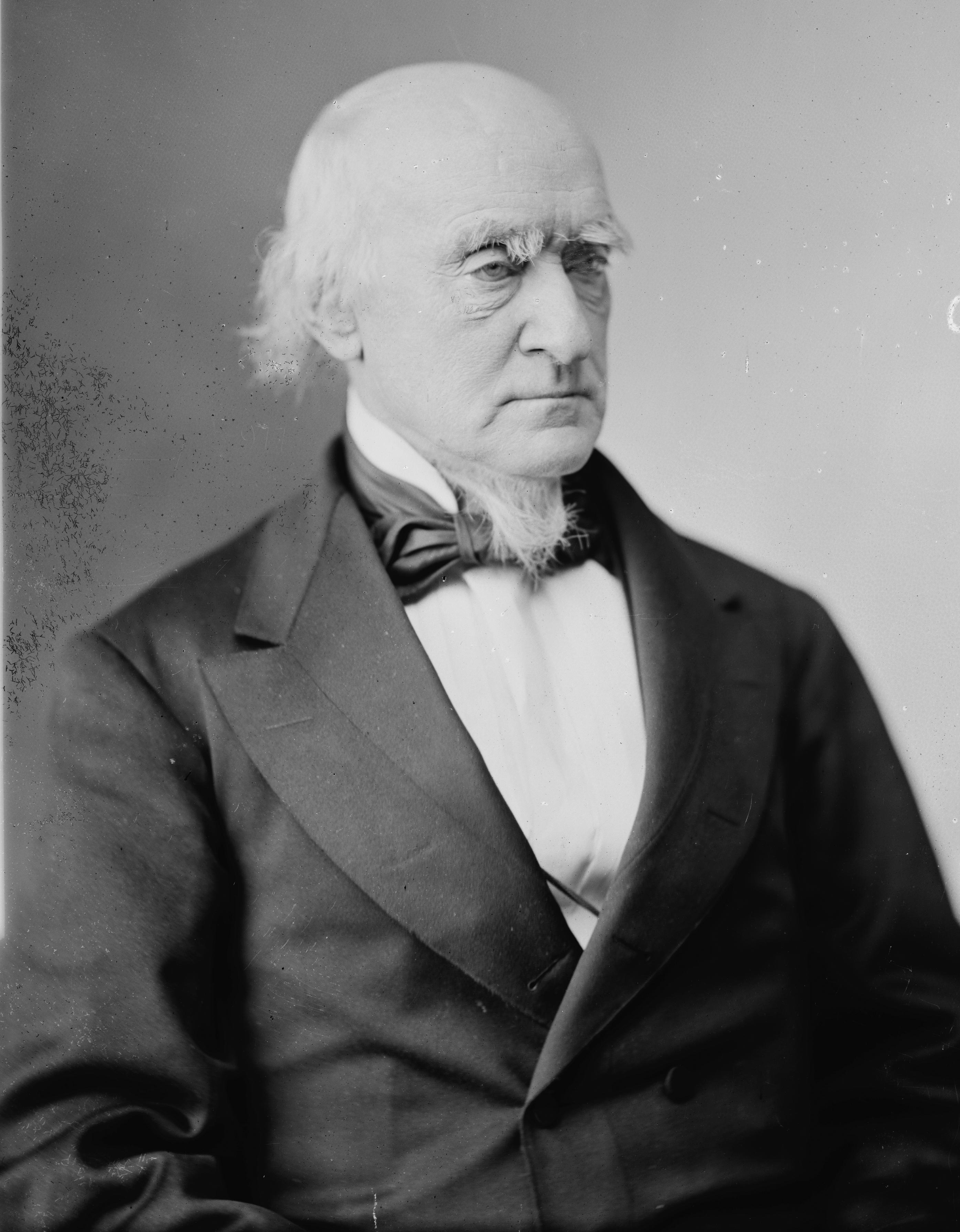
John Archibald Campbell was Pierce's only appointee to the Supreme Court.

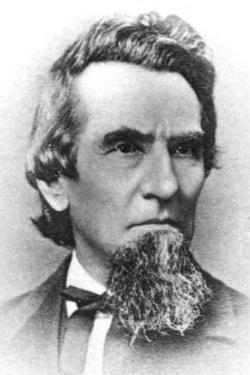
James M. Love, named to the United States District Court for the District of Iowa, was Pierce's longest-serving appointee.

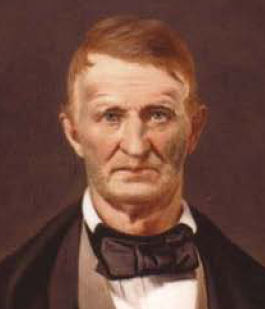
Former Indiana Supreme Court Justice Isaac Newton Blackford was among Pierce's appointments to the newly created United States Court of Claims.

== United States Supreme Court justices ==
#	Justice	Seat	State	Former justice	Nomination date	Confirmation date	Began active service	Ended active service
1	John Archibald Campbell	8	Alabama	John McKinley	March 21, 1853	March 22, 1853	March 22, 1853	April 30, 1861

== Circuit courts ==
#	Judge	Circuit	Nomination date	Confirmation date	Began active service	Ended active service
1	Matthew Hall McAllister	California	March 2, 1855	March 3, 1855	March 3, 1855	January 12, 1863
2	James Dunlop	D.C.	December 3, 1855	December 7, 1855	November 27, 1855	March 3, 1863
3	William Matthews Merrick	D.C.	December 14, 1855	December 14, 1855	December 14, 1855	March 3, 1863

== District courts ==
#	Judge	Court (Note: See List of United States district and territorial courts)	Nomination date	Confirmation date	Began active service	Ended active service
1	West Hughes Humphreys	E.D. Tenn. M.D. Tenn. W.D. Tenn.	March 24, 1853	March 26, 1853	March 26, 1853	June 26, 1862
2	Charles A. Ingersoll	D. Conn.	April 6, 1853	April 8, 1853	April 8, 1853	January 12, 1860
3	William Fell Giles	D. Md.	December 19, 1853	January 11, 1854	July 18, 1853	March 21, 1879
4	Isaac Stockton Keith Ogier	S.D. Cal.	January 18, 1854	January 23, 1854	January 23, 1854	May 21, 1861
5	Hiram V. Willson	N.D. Ohio	February 10, 1855	February 20, 1855	February 20, 1855	November 11, 1866
6	Samuel Hubbel Treat Jr.	S.D. Ill.	March 3, 1855	March 3, 1855	March 3, 1855	March 27, 1887
7	James M. Love	D. Iowa/S.D. Iowa	February 7, 1856	February 25, 1856	October 5, 1855	July 2, 1891
8	McQueen McIntosh	N.D. Fla.	February 27, 1856	March 11, 1856	March 11, 1856	January 3, 1861
9	Andrew Gordon Magrath	D.S.C.	May 9, 1856	May 12, 1856	May 12, 1856	November 7, 1860
10	David Allen Smalley	D. Vt.	February 2, 1857	February 3, 1857	February 3, 1857	March 10, 1877
11	Thomas Howard DuVal	W.D. Tex.	February 26, 1857	March 3, 1857	March 3, 1857	October 10, 1880
12	Samuel Treat	E.D. Mo.	March 3, 1857	March 3, 1857	March 3, 1857	March 5, 1887

== Specialty courts (Article I) ==
=== United States Court of Claims ===
#	Judge	Nomination date	Confirmation date	Began active service	Ended active service
1	Isaac Blackford	March 3, 1855	March 3, 1855	March 3, 1855	December 31, 1859
2	John Gilchrist	March 3, 1855	March 3, 1855	March 3, 1855	April 29, 1858
3	George Parker Scarburgh	January 22, 1856	February 11, 1856	May 8, 1855	April 20, 1861

== Sources ==
- Federal Judicial Center
