= Henry Curtis Lind =

American lawyer

14th Reporter of Decisions of the Supreme Court of the United States
- In office 1979–1989
- Preceded by: Henry Putzel Jr.
- Succeeded by: Frank D. Wagner

Personal details
- Born: October 12, 1921 Cranston, Rhode Island, U.S.
- Died: November 11, 2013 (aged 92)
- Education: Princeton University (AB); Harvard University
- Profession: Lawyer

Henry Curtis Lind (October 12, 1921 – November 11, 2013) was an American lawyer and the fourteenth reporter of decisions of the United States Supreme Court from 1979 to 1987.

Born in Cranston, Rhode Island, he received his A.B. from Princeton University in 1943 and his law degree from Harvard University in 1949. He was in private practice from 1949 to 1957, when he joined the staff of the Lawyers Co-operative Publishing Company in Rochester, New York, editing the Lawyer's Edition of the United States Reports and the United States Supreme Court Digest. He was assistant reporter of decisions for the court from 1973 to 1979 and oversaw the transition from hot lead to computer typesetting. He also wrote a manual of style and composition for judicial writing.

Legal offices
Preceded by Henry Putzel, Jr.	United States Supreme Court Reporter of Decisions; 1979 – 1989	Succeeded by Frank D. Wagner
