= Walter Wyatt =

American lawyer

Walter Wyatt (July 20, 1893 – February 26, 1978) was an American lawyer, who served as the twelfth Reporter of Decisions of the Supreme Court of the United States.

Born in Savannah, Georgia, Wyatt received his LL.B. from the University of Virginia in 1917. During World War I, Wyatt worked as legal adviser to the Selective Service System, the federal agency charged with enforcing the newly implemented military draft. From 1922 to 1946, he was an attorney for the Federal Reserve System, ending his career there as General Counsel of the agency, and from 1936 to 1946, he also served as counsel to a related agency, the Federal Open Market Committee. During this period, Wyatt also authored several books on banking law.

Wyatt was appointed as the Supreme Court's Reporter of Decisions on March 1, 1946, after the post had been vacant for two years following the death of Ernest Knaebel. He retroactively edited the volumes of the United States Reports covering those two years, volumes 322 to 325.

Wyatt died in Washington, D.C., in 1978. His papers are held at the Albert and Shirley Small Special Collections Library at the University of Virginia.

Legal offices
Preceded by Ernest Knaebel	United States Supreme Court Reporter of Decisions; 1946 – 1963	Succeeded by Henry Putzel Jr.
