= Rebecca Anne Womeldorf =

American lawyer

17th Reporter of Decisions of the Supreme Court of the United States
- Incumbent
- Assumed office January 13, 2021
- Preceded by: Christine Luchok Fallon

Personal details
- Education: Rhodes College (BA); Washington and Lee University (JD)

Rebecca Anne Womeldorf is an American lawyer serving as the reporter of decisions of the Supreme Court of the United States. Womeldorf was appointed in December 2020 and began her service in January 2021. She is the second woman to hold the position.

== Education ==
Womeldorf earned her Bachelor of Arts degree from Rhodes College in 1988 and Juris Doctor from the Washington and Lee University School of Law in 1991, graduating summa cum laude.

== Career ==
Womeldorf served as law clerk to then retired Justice Lewis F. Powell Jr. and Justice Anthony Kennedy, both of the Supreme Court of the United States. She practiced law in Washington, D.C. as a litigation partner at Hollingsworth LLP from 1999 until 2015. She then served as Secretary and chief counsel to the Committee on Rules of Practice and Procedure of the Judicial Conference of the United States through early 2021, overseeing staff responsible for providing administrative, legal, and technical support to the committee and its advisory committees.

== See also ==
- List of law clerks for the first seat of the Supreme Court of the United States
