= Bancroft Davis =

American politician (1822–1907)

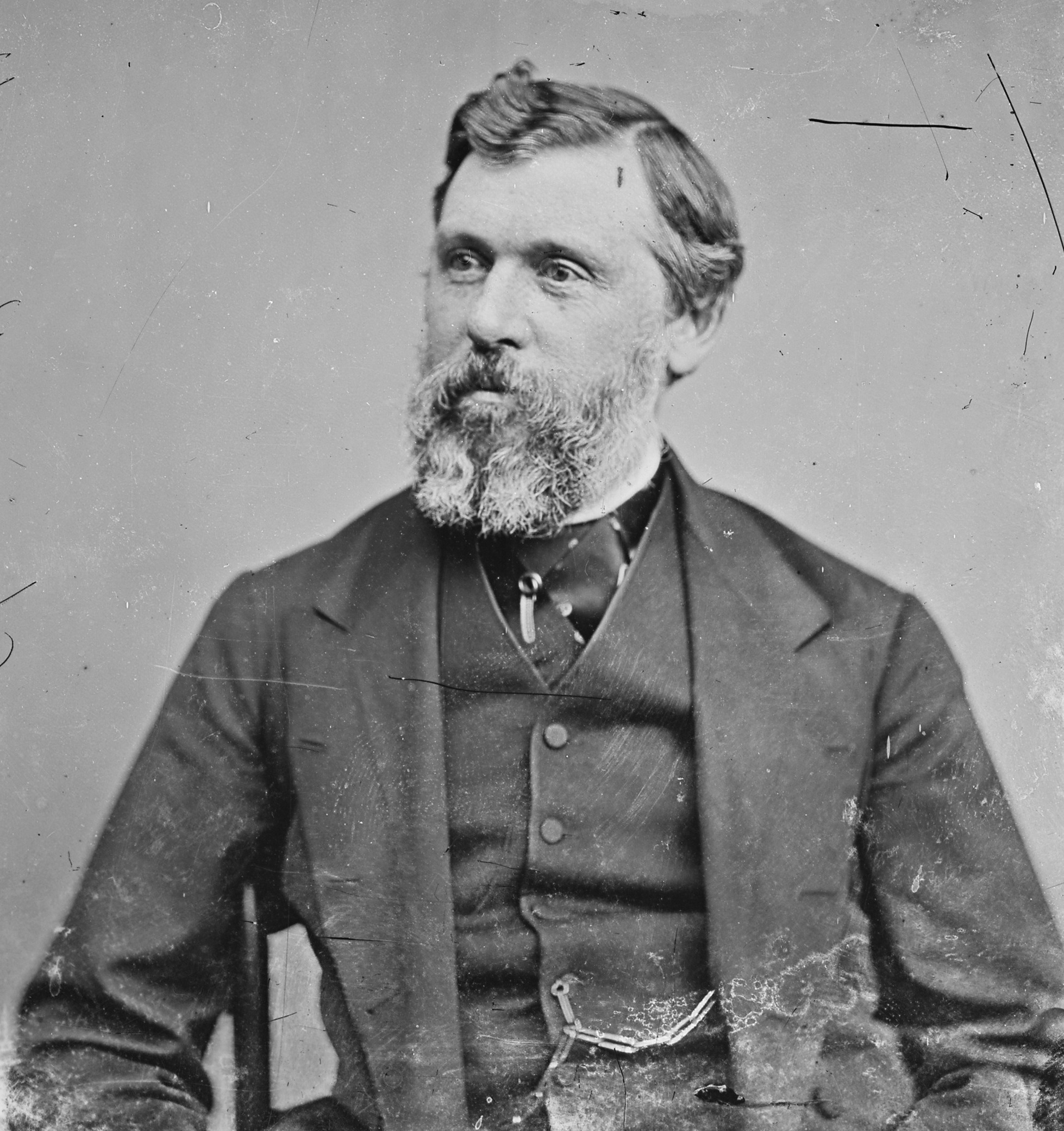
- Davis, c. 1860–1865

9th Reporter of Decisions of the Supreme Court of the United States
- In office 1883–1902
- Preceded by: William Tod Otto
- Succeeded by: Charles Henry Butler

Judge of the Court of Claims
- In office December 20, 1882 – November 5, 1883
- Appointed by: Chester A. Arthur
- Preceded by: himself
- Succeeded by: Lawrence Weldon
- In office December 14, 1877 – December 9, 1881
- Appointed by: Rutherford B. Hayes
- Preceded by: Edward G. Loring
- Succeeded by: himself

7th, 9th & 14th United States Assistant Secretary of State
- In office December 19, 1881 – July 7, 1882
- Preceded by: Robert R. Hitt
- Succeeded by: John Davis
- In office January 24, 1873 – January 30, 1874
- Preceded by: Charles Hale
- Succeeded by: John Cadwalader
- In office March 25, 1869 – November 13, 1871
- Preceded by: Frederick W. Seward
- Succeeded by: Charles Hale

13th Envoy from the United States to the German Empire
- In office August 28, 1874 – September 26, 1877
- President: Ulysses S. Grant; Rutherford B. Hayes
- Preceded by: George Bancroft
- Succeeded by: Bayard Taylor

Member of the New York State Assembly from the Orange County, 1st district
- In office January 1, 1869 – March 26, 1869
- Preceded by: William C. H. Sherman
- Succeeded by: Odell S. Hathaway

Personal details
- Born: John Chandler Bancroft Davis; December 29, 1822 Worcester, Massachusetts, U.S.
- Died: December 27, 1907 (aged 84) Washington, D.C., U.S.
- Party: Republican
- Parent: John Davis (father)
- Relatives: Horace Davis
- Education: Harvard University (A.B.) read law

John Chandler Bancroft Davis (December 29, 1822 – December 27, 1907), commonly known as (J. C.) Bancroft Davis, was an attorney, diplomat, judge of the Court of Claims, and Reporter of Decisions of the Supreme Court of the United States.

== Education and career ==
Born on December 29, 1822, in Worcester, Massachusetts, Davis read law in 1844 and received an Artium Baccalaureus degree in 1847 from Harvard University. He originally entered Harvard with the class of 1840 but was suspended in his senior year and did not graduate with his original class. He was Secretary and charge d'affaires for the London legation with the United States Department of State from 1849 to 1852. He entered private practice in New York City, New York from 1853 to 1862. He was an American correspondent for the London Times from 1854 to 1861. Because of ill health, Davis retired from his law work in 1862, and settled on a farm in rural New York until he regained his health. He was a member of the New York State Assembly (Orange County, 1st District) in 1869 but vacated his seat on March 26, 1869 to accept a federal post. He was a United States Assistant Secretary of State from 1869 to 1871, and from 1873 to 1874, under President Ulysses S. Grant. He was Secretary and United States Agent for the Joint High Commission in Geneva, Switzerland from 1871 to 1873. In 1874, he was appointed as the United States Envoy to the German Empire, serving in that position until 1877.

== Federal judicial service ==
Davis was nominated by President Rutherford B. Hayes on December 12, 1877, to a seat on the Court of Claims (later the United States Court of Claims) vacated by Judge Edward G. Loring. He was confirmed by the United States Senate on December 14, 1877, and received his commission the same day. His service terminated on December 9, 1881, due to his resignation to again accept the post of United States Assistant Secretary of State from 1881 to 1882.

Davis was nominated by President Chester A. Arthur on December 13, 1882, to the seat on the Court of Claims vacated by himself. He was confirmed by the Senate on December 20, 1882, and received his commission the same day. His service terminated on November 5, 1883, due to his resignation.

== Reporter of decisions ==
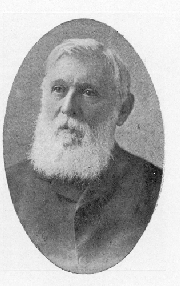
Bancroft Davis later in life

Davis served as Reporter of Decisions of the Supreme Court of the United States from 1883 to 1902.

=== Role in corporate personhood controversy ===
Acting as court reporter in Santa Clara County v. Southern Pacific Railroad, 118 U.S. 394 (1886), dealing with taxation of railroad properties, Davis plays a historical role in the corporate personhood debate. The position of court reporter entailed that he write "a summary-of-the-case commentary." Why Bancroft Davis's role in the controversy is worth mentioning is that he noted in the headnote to the court's opinion that the Chief Justice Morrison Waite began oral argument by stating, "The court does not wish to hear argument on the question whether the provision in the Fourteenth Amendment to the Constitution, which forbids a State to deny to any person within its jurisdiction the equal protection of the laws, applies to these corporations. We are all of the opinion that it does."

In a published account of Bancroft's collected Supreme Court reports and notes from 1885 to 1886, he wrote of the Santa Clara County v. Southern Pacific Railroad case that, "The defendant Corporations are persons within the intent of the clause in section 1 of the Fourteenth Amendment to the Constitution of the United States, which forbids a State to deny to any person within its jurisdiction the equal protection of the laws."

Journalists and authors such as Thom Hartman have since cited Davis's prior position as president of Newburgh and New York Railway as evidence of a conflict of interest in the corporate personhood interpretation of a Supreme Court ruling dealing with a railroad. The controversy regarding Bancroft Davis's summary remains unsolved.

== Death ==
Davis died on December 27, 1907, at his residence, 1621 H Street NW, in Washington, DC

== Family ==
Davis was the son of John Davis, a Whig governor of Massachusetts, and was the older brother of United States Representative Horace Davis.

== Personal ==
On November 19, 1857, Davis married Frederica Gore King (1829–1916). Frederica was the daughter of James G. King (1791–1853), an American businessman and Whig Party politician and the granddaughter of both Archibald Gracie and Rufus King, who was the Federalist candidate for both Vice President (1804 and 1808) and President of the United States (1816). They did not have any children.

== Honors ==
Davis was elected a member of the American Antiquarian Society in 1851.

== Works ==
- (1847) The Massachusetts Justice LCCN 05-17539
- (1871) The Case of the United States Laid before the Tribunal of Arbitration at Geneva LCCN 10-16624
- (1873) Treaties and Conventions Concluded between the United States of America and Other Powers, Since July 4, 1776 (Revised edition) LCCN 11-33794
- (1893) Mr. Fish and the Alabama Claims: A Chapter in Diplomatic History LCCN 11-24903, LCCN 71-95065
- (1897) Origin of the Book of Common Prayer of the Protestant Episcopal Church in the United States of America

== See also ==
- Davis political family

== Sources ==
- "Davis, John Chandler Bancroft - Federal Judicial Center". www.fjc.gov.
- The United States Court of Claims : a history / pt. 1. The judges, 1855–1976 / by Marion T. Bennett / pt. 2. Origin, development, jurisdiction, 1855–1978 / W. Cowen, P. Nichols, M.T. Bennett. Washington, D.C. : Committee on the Bicentennial of Independence and the Constitution of the Judicial Conference of the United States, 1976 i.e. 1977–1978. 2 vols.
- Schlup, Leonard (2003). Schlup, Leonard C.; Ryan, James Gilbert (eds.). Historical Dictionary of the Gilded Age. M.E. Sharpe. p. 124. ISBN 9780765621061.
- "Annual Report of the State Engineer and Surveyor of the State of New York, and of the Tabulations and Deductions from the Reports of the Railroad Corporations for the Year Ending September 30, 1867". The Argus Company, Albany, NY. 1868. p. 336.

New York State Assembly
Preceded by William C. H. Sherman	New York State Assembly Orange County, 1st District; 1869	Succeeded by Odell S. Hathaway
Legal offices
Preceded by Edward G. Loring	Judge of the Court of Claims; 1877–1881	Succeeded by himself
Preceded by himself	Judge of the Court of Claims; 1882–1883	Succeeded by Lawrence Weldon
Preceded by William Tod Otto	Reporter of Decisions of the Supreme Court of the United States; 1883–1902	Succeeded by Charles Henry Butler
