= Charles Henry Butler =

American lawyer

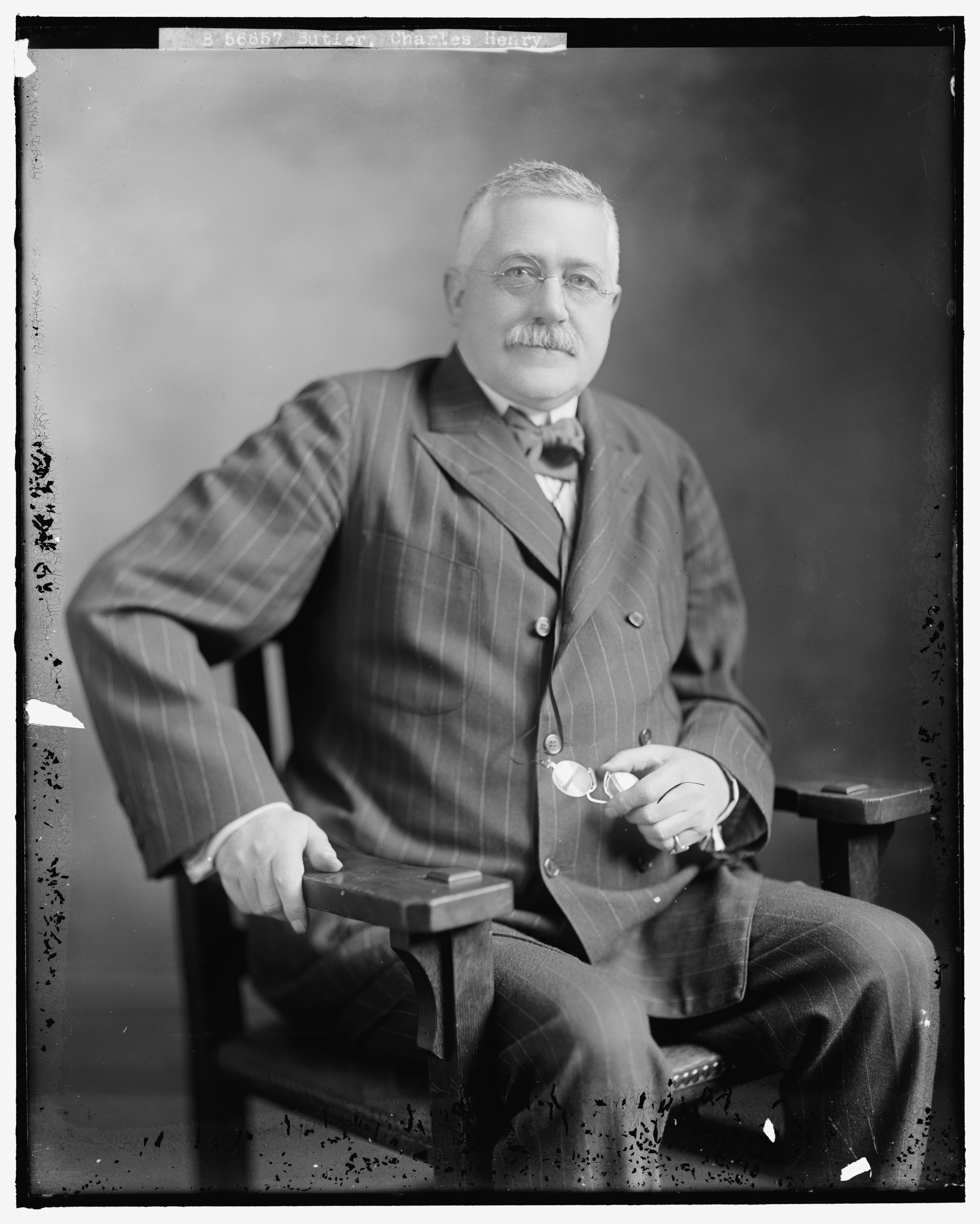
- Born: 18 June 1859; New York City, U.S.
- Died: 9 February 1940 (aged 80)
- Education: Non Graduate class of 1881, Honorary Master of Arts 1912
- Alma mater: Princeton University
- Occupation: Lawyer
- Years active: 1882-1940
- Known for: Diplomat, Lawyer
- Notable work: Treaty Making Power of the United States - 1902
- Title: 10th Reporter of Decision of United States Supreme Court (1912-1916)
- Political party: Republican Party

Charles Henry Butler (June 18, 1859 – February 9, 1940) was an American lawyer and the tenth reporter of decisions of the United States Supreme Court, serving from 1902 to 1916.

Born in New York City, his parents were William Allen, Mary R. (Marshall) Butler, he was the grandson of United States Attorney General Benjamin F. Butler. He attended Princeton University, but did not graduate. Nevertheless, he was admitted to the New York bar in 1882 and practiced there until his appointment as reporter of decisions, in 1902. His book, Treaty Making Power of the United States, was published in 1902. In 1898 he was a member of the Fairbanks-Herschell Commission that unsuccessfully attempted to resolve the Alaska Boundary Dispute, and in 1907 was a delegate to The Hague peace conference. Butler resigned as reporter because he found the work boring and he hated the anonymity. He resumed the practice of law in 1916 in Washington, D.C. Before his death, he wrote an anecdotal account of his grandfather's, his father's, and his own dealings with the Supreme Court, A Century at the Bar of the Supreme Court of the United States, which, in 1942, was published by G. P. Putnam's Sons. He died in Washington.

Legal offices
Preceded by Bancroft Davis	United States Supreme Court Reporter of Decisions; 1902 – 1916	Succeeded by Ernest Knaebel
