= Frank D. Wagner (lawyer) =

15th Reporter of Decisions of the Supreme Court of the United States
- In office 1987 – September 30, 2010
- Preceded by: Henry Curtis Lind
- Succeeded by: Christine Luchok Fallon

Personal details
- Born: Frank Douglas Wagner; August 6, 1945 Lansdowne, Pennsylvania, U.S.
- Died: August 28, 2016 (aged 71)
- Education: Cornell University (A.B.); Dickinson School of Law (J.D.)

Frank Douglas Wagner (August 6, 1945 – August 28, 2016) was an American lawyer who served as the 15th Reporter of Decisions of the United States Supreme Court from 1987 to September 30, 2010.

Wagner was born in Lansdowne, Pennsylvania. He received his A.B. in English from Cornell University in 1967 and his J.D. from the Dickinson School of Law in 1970. After practicing law in Pottstown, Pennsylvania, he was a legal editor with the Lawyers Co-operative Publishing Company in Rochester, New York, and later with the Research Institute of America in Washington, DC, editing publications on federal law.

During his tenure as Reporter of Decisions, Wagner was responsible for 82 volumes of the U.S. Reports, more than any previous Reporter. He also led the team that created the Supreme Court's first website, and co-chaired the committee that wrote the Association of Reporters of Judicial Decisions’ influential position paper on "official" on-line documents.

Wagner retired as Reporter of Decisions in 2010, and was succeeded by Christine Luchok Fallon. He died on August 28, 2016, at the age of 71.

== Notes ==
Legal offices
Preceded by Henry Curtis Lind	United States Supreme Court Reporter of Decisions; 1987-2010	Succeeded by Christine Luchok Fallon
