= John Conrad Otto =

American physician

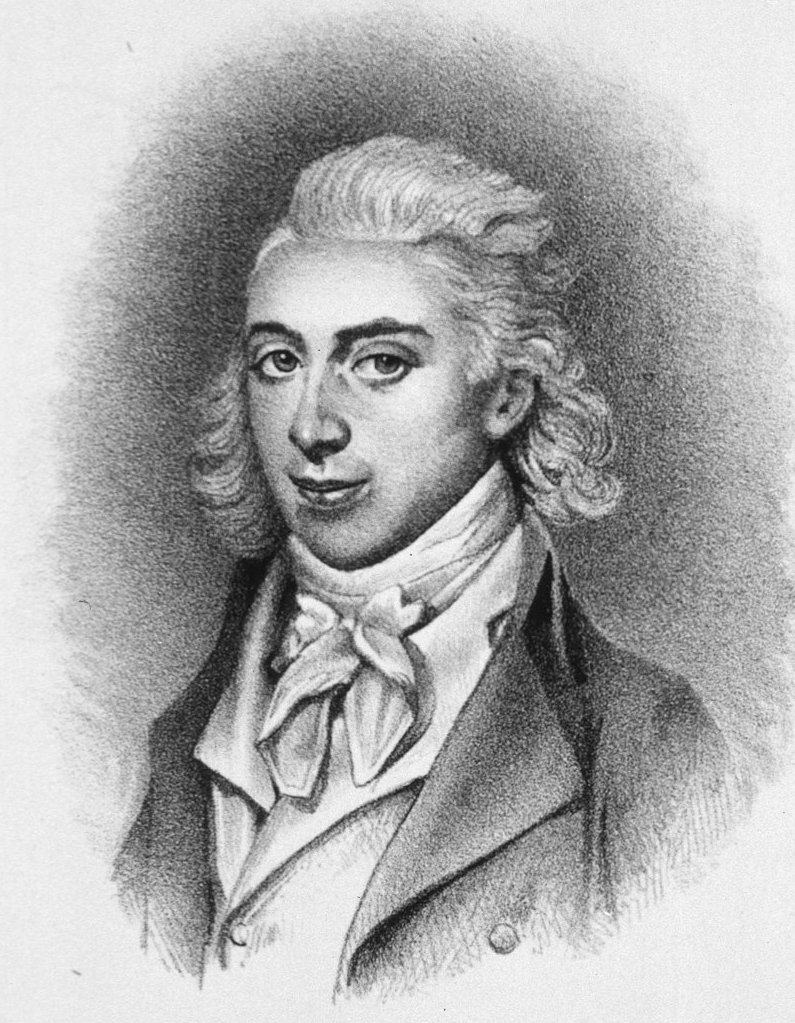
- Born: March 15, 1774
- Died: June 26, 1844 (aged 70); Philadelphia, Pennsylvania, U.S.
- Citizenship: American
- Education: University of Pennsylvania
- Occupation: Physician

John Conrad Otto (born near Woodbridge, New Jersey, 15 March 1774; died in Philadelphia, 26 June 1844) was an American medical doctor.

== Biography ==
His father, Bodo Otto, was a medical doctor, and warmly attached to the patriot cause during the American Revolutionary War. He sat in the senate of New Jersey, and served during the war as an officer in the Continental Army. The son graduated from Princeton in 1792, and in medicine at the University of Pennsylvania in 1796. In 1798 he was elected one of the physicians of the Philadelphia Dispensary, and in 1813, on the death of Benjamin Rush, he was chosen to succeed the latter as one of the physicians and clinical lecturer of the Pennsylvania Hospital, which post he held 21 years, and in connection with which he became extensively known throughout the United States.

Otto was physician to the Orphan Asylum for twenty years, and during many years to the Magdalen Asylum. In the cholera epidemic of 1833 he was one of the twelve physicians that were chosen by the public authorities of Philadelphia to adopt sanitary measures and establish and conduct hospitals in the city, and at the organization of the sanitary board he was chosen its president. He was a fellow of the College of Physicians, in which he held the office of censor, and from 1840 until his death that of vice president, and was for many years a member of the American Philosophical Society (elected 1817).

== Works ==
He wrote "An Account of an Hemorrhagic Disposition in certain Families" in the New York Medical Repository (1803), another paper on the same subject in Coxe's Medical Museum (1805), and again in the Medical and Physical Journal (1808). It is said that these papers are the first that appeared on this subject, namely hemophilia. He was also the author of other medical papers.

== Family ==
His great-grandfather and grandfather were also physicians. His grandfather came to this country from Germany in 1752, settled in Philadelphia, where he engaged in the practice of medicine, and during the winter of 1778 had charge of the hospital of the Continental Army at Valley Forge. His son William Tod Otto was a judge and the eighth reporter of decisions of the United States Supreme Court.
