= Reporter of Decisions of the Supreme Court of the United States =

- Seal of the Supreme Court
- Incumbent; Rebecca Anne Womeldorf since January 13, 2021
- Supreme Court of the United States
- Style: Reporter
- Status: Editor-in-chief; Publisher
- Reports to: Supreme Court of the United States; Chief Justice of the United States
- Seat: Supreme Court Building, Washington, D.C.
- Appointer: The Supreme Court
- Term length: No fixed term
- Constituting instrument: 28 U.S.C. § 673
- Formation: 1817
- First holder: Alexander J. Dallas
- Website: www.supremecourt.gov

The reporter of decisions of the Supreme Court of the United States is the official charged with editing and publishing the opinions of the Supreme Court of the United States, both when announced and when they are published in permanent bound volumes of the United States Reports. The reporter is responsible for only the contents of the United States Reports issued by the Government Publishing Office, first in preliminary prints and later in the final bound volumes. The reporter is not responsible for the editorial content of unofficial reports of the court's decisions, such as the privately published Supreme Court Reporter and Lawyers' Edition.

By federal statute, the reporter is appointed by the Supreme Court. The current reporter is Rebecca Anne Womeldorf.

== History ==
The first two reporters acted in an unofficial capacity. Only in 1817 did Congress create the statutory office of reporter, with a $1,000 a year salary. The early reporters profited from selling the printed volumes of the reports of decisions. In 1874, Congress for the first time appropriated funds to publish the volumes of the court's opinions; from that time the report was known as the United States Reports and numbering began as if the first volume by the first reporter, Alexander J. Dallas, was number one. The Government Printing Office took over publication of the United States Reports in 1922. The title of court's reporter was changed to "Reporter of Decisions" in 1953, to clarify the duties of the office.

== List of reporters ==
The 16 reporters of decisions are listed here with their tenures and the volumes of the United States Reports they edited. Volumes 1 through 90 were also known by the name of the reporter of decisions at the time and the numbers of those nominative reports are listed after the United States Reports numbers.

Name		Tenure	Volumes edited
1	Alexander J. Dallas	1790–1800	1–4 (1–4 Dallas)
2	William Cranch	1801–1815	5–13 (1–9 Cranch)
3	Henry Wheaton	1816–1827	14–25 (1–12 Wheat.)
4	Richard Peters	1828–1842	26–41 (1–16 Pet.)
5	Benjamin Chew Howard	1843–1860	42–65 (1–24 How.)
6	Jeremiah S. Black	1861–1862	66–67 (1–2 Black)
7	John William Wallace	1863–1874	68–90 (1–23 Wall.)
8	William Tod Otto	1875–1883	91–107
9	J. C. Bancroft Davis	1883–1902	108–186
10	Charles Henry Butler	1902–1916	187–241
11	Ernest Knaebel	1916–1944	242–321
–	Office vacant	1944–1946	322–325 (Note: Volumes 322–325 (1944–1946) were retroactively edited by Walter Wyatt after he became Reporter of Decisions in 1946.)
12	Walter Wyatt	1946–1963	326–375
13	Henry Putzel Jr.	1964–1979	376–444
14	Henry Curtis Lind	1979–1987	445–479
15	Frank D. Wagner	1987 – September 30, 2010	480–561
16	Christine Luchok Fallon	March 3, 2011 – September 25, 2020	562–591
17	Rebecca Anne Womeldorf	January 13, 2021 – present	592–

== See also ==
- Court reporter
- Lists of United States Supreme Court cases by volume
- Reporter of decisions for similar offices in other countries
- United States v. Detroit Timber & Lumber Co.
- Wheaton v. Peters, a dispute between two reporters that reached the Supreme Court
