= John Gilchrist (judge) =

American judge (1809–1858)

Presiding Judge of the Court of Claims
- In office 1855–1858
- Preceded by: Office established
- Succeeded by: Isaac Blackford

Judge of the Court of Claims
- In office March 3, 1855 – April 29, 1858
- Appointed by: Franklin Pierce
- Preceded by: Seat established by 10 Stat. 612
- Succeeded by: Edward G. Loring

Chief Justice of the New Hampshire Superior Court of Judicature
- In office 1848–1855

Justice of the New Hampshire Superior Court of Judicature
- In office 1840–1855

Personal details
- Born: John James Gilchrist; February 16, 1809 Medford, Massachusetts, U.S.
- Died: April 29, 1858 (aged 49) Washington, D.C., U.S.
- Education: Harvard University; Harvard Law School

John James Gilchrist (February 16, 1809 – April 29, 1858) was a Justice and chief justice of the New Hampshire Superior Court of Judicature and a judge and Presiding Judge of the Court of Claims.

== Education and career ==
Born on February 16, 1809, in Medford, Massachusetts, graduated from Harvard University in 1828, and graduated from Harvard Law School in 1831. He entered private practice in Charlestown, New Hampshire from 1831 to 1836. He was a member of the New Hampshire House of Representatives from 1836 to 1837. He was register of probate for Sullivan County, New Hampshire in 1836. He was a justice of the New Hampshire Superior Court of Judicature (now the Supreme Court of New Hampshire) from 1840 to 1855, serving as chief justice from 1848 to 1855.

== Federal judicial service ==
Gilchrist was nominated by President Franklin Pierce on March 3, 1855, to the Court of Claims (later the United States Court of Claims), to a new seat authorized by 10 Stat. 612. He was confirmed by the United States Senate on March 3, 1855, and received his commission the same day. He served as Presiding Judge from 1855 to 1858. His service terminated on April 29, 1858, due to his death in Washington, D.C.

== Sources ==
- "Gilchrist, John James - Federal Judicial Center". www.fjc.gov.

Legal offices
Preceded by Joel Parker	Chief Justice of the New Hampshire; Superior Court of Judicature; 1855	Succeeded by Andrew Salter Woods
Legal offices
Preceded by Seat established by 10 Stat. 612	Judge of the Court of Claims; 1855–1858	Succeeded by Edward G. Loring
Preceded by Office established	Presiding Judge of the Court of Claims; 1855–1858	Succeeded by Isaac Blackford
