= John James Marshall =

American politician

John James Marshall (August 4, 1785 – July 1846) was a lawyer, circuit court judge, and politician. A graduate of Princeton University, he was the son of Humphrey Marshall, the leader of the Kentucky Federalist Party. He represented Franklin County in the Kentucky House of Representatives in 1815 and 1816, and in 1820 was elected to the Kentucky Senate for a four-year term. From 1829 until 1833 he was reporter of the Kentucky Court of Appeals and published seven volumes of decisions of cases of law and equity. In 1833 he served as elector in the United States Electoral College, and the same year was once more elected representative from his district to the state legislature. In 1837 he was appointed by Governor James Clark judge of the circuit embracing Louisville, and move to that city. He continued to occupy that office up to the date of his death.
