= George Ticknor Curtis =

American writer (1812–1894)

George Ticknor Curtis (November 28, 1812 – March 28, 1894) was an American historian, lawyer, and writer.

== Biography ==
Curtis was born in Watertown, Massachusetts, and graduated from Harvard University in 1832 and then Harvard Law School. After admittance to the Massachusetts bar in 1836, he practiced first in Boston and then in New York City. Curtis was very successful as a patent attorney, working for (among others) Samuel F. B. Morse, Charles Goodyear and Cyrus McCormick.

From 1840 to 1843, Curtis was a member of the Massachusetts House of Representatives as a Whig. A political ally of Daniel Webster, he was one of the "Cotton Whigs" who joined the Democratic Party when the Whig party dissolved in 1856.

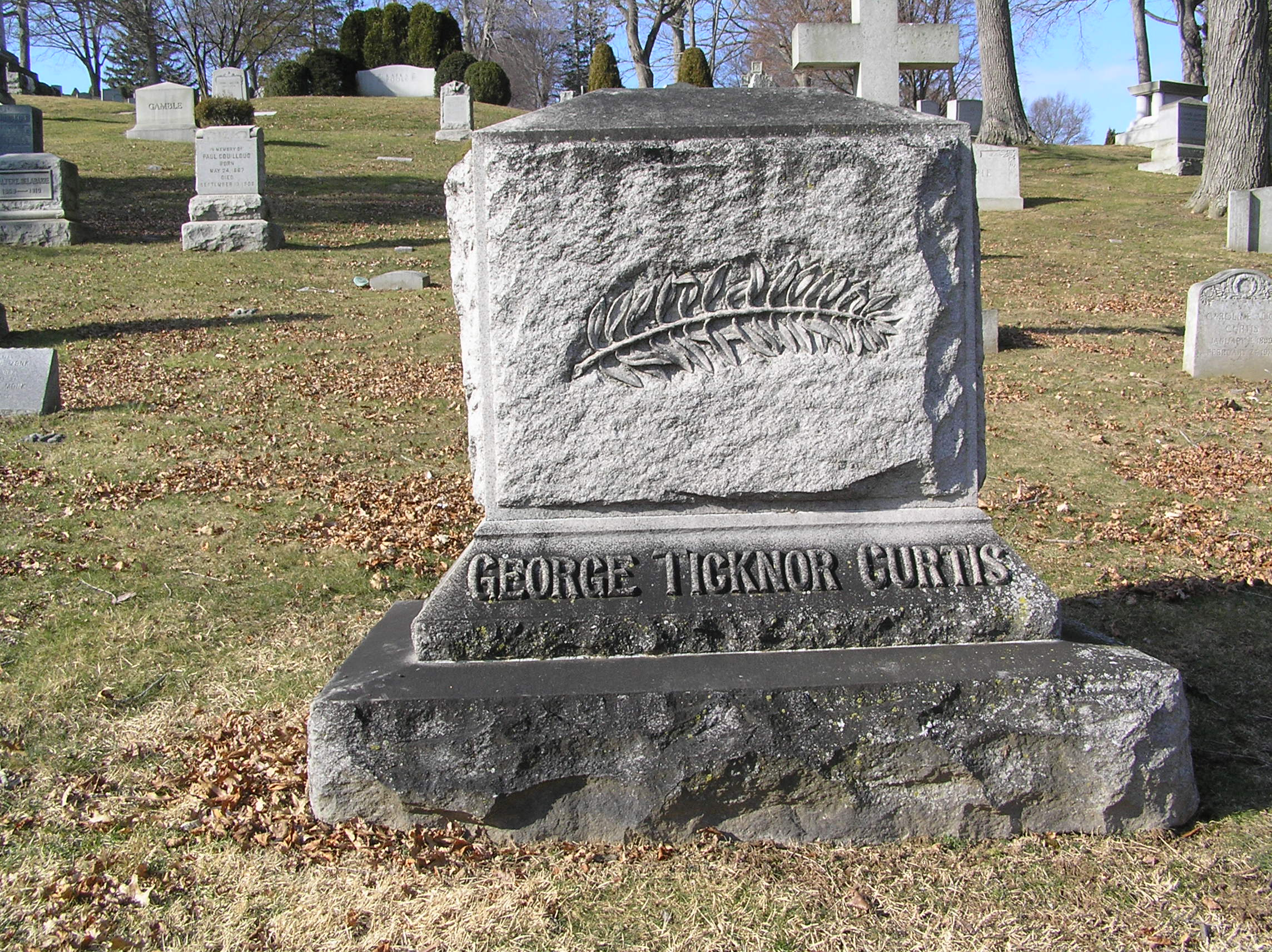
The tombstone of George Ticknor Curtis

Later, as a U.S. commissioner at Boston, Curtis was compelled to send a former slave, Thomas Sims, back to slavery in compliance with the Fugitive Slave Law of 1850. He served as co-counsel for Dred Scott when his case reached the United States Supreme Court in 1857. His brother, Benjamin Robbins Curtis, was notable as one of the two dissenters in Dred Scott v. Sandford.

Curtis wrote biographies of Daniel Webster (1870) and James Buchanan (1883) as well as a number of legal treatises, including his oft-cited "A Treatise on the Law of Patents for Useful Inventions in the United States of America" (Curtis on Patents). Among these, his Constitutional History of the United States [...] to the Close of the Civil War (2 vols., 1889 and 1896) has been called the classic Federalist interpretation of the Constitution. Another notable work is History of the Origin, Formation and Adoption of the Constitution.

Curtis was a creationist; he attacked evolution in his book Creation or Evolution? A Philosophical Inquiry (1887).

While not a Mormon himself (he was a member of the Federal Street Church, a Unitarian congregation), Curtis was also a defender of Mormonism, writing pro-Mormon articles for New York newspapers and magazines, most notably the New York Evening Post (July 14, 1887) and The Forum (November 1887).

He died in New York City on March 28, 1894.

== Selected publications ==
- A Treatise on the Rights and Duties of Merchant Seamen, According to the General Maritime Law, and the Statutes of the United States (1841)
- History of the Origin, Formation, and Adoption of the Constitution of the United States (Volume 1, 1854)
- History of the Origin, Formation, and Adoption of the Constitution of the United States (Volume 2, 1861)
- The Just Supremacy of Congress Over the Territories (1859)
- A Treatise on the Law of Patents for Useful Inventions (1873)
- Life of James Buchanan, Fifteenth President of the United States (Volume 1, 1883)
- Life of James Buchanan, Fifteenth President of the United States (Volume 2, 1883)
- A Plea for Religious Liberty and the Rights of Conscience (1886)
- Creation or Evolution?: A Philosophical Inquiry (1887)
- Life, Character, and Public Services of General George B. McClellan (1887)
- Life of Daniel Webster (Volume 1, 1889)
- Life of Daniel Webster (Volume 2, 1889)
