= John William Wallace =

American lawyer

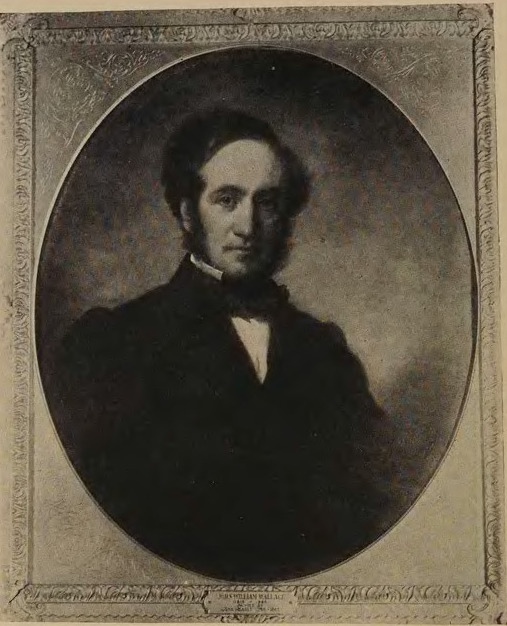
- portrait by John Neagle
- Born: 1815
- Died: 1884 (aged 68–69)

John William Wallace (February 17, 1815 – January 12, 1884) was an American lawyer and the seventh reporter of decisions of the United States Supreme Court, serving from 1863 to 1874.

== Formative years ==
Born in Philadelphia on February 17, 1815, Wallace graduated from the University of Pennsylvania in 1833. He then studied law under his father and John Sergeant and was admitted to the Philadelphia bar in 1836.

== Career ==
While working as librarian to the Law Association of Philadelphia, he compiled three volumes of decisions of the Third Circuit Court of Appeals, which sat in that city. He wrote The Reporters on English reporters and cases, first as an article in the American Law Magazine (1844), and then as a book in multiple editions (1845, 1855, 1882) that made his reputation.

His twenty-three volumes of reports of the Supreme Court's cases (volumes 68-90) are highly respected for their quality. He also served as president of the Historical Society of Pennsylvania (April 13, 1868 – January 12, 1884).

== Death ==
Wallace died in Philadelphia, his hometown, on January 12, 1884.

Legal offices
Preceded by Jeremiah S. Black	United States Supreme Court Reporter of Decisions; 1863 – 1874	Succeeded by William Tod Otto
