= List of Norwegian churches in the United States =

Norwegian churches in the United States include:

(by state then city)

- Norwegian Seamen's Church, San Pedro (Los Angeles, California)
- Faith Bible Church, (Northridge, California)
- Norwegian Seamen's Church, San Francisco, (San Francisco, California)
- Norwegian Seamen's Church, Miami, (Davie, Florida)
- Norwegian Lutheran Memorial Church, (Chicago, Illinois)
- Old East Paint Creek Lutheran Church, (Waterville, Iowa)
- Sheldahl First Norwegian Evangelical Lutheran Church, (Sheldahl, Iowa)
- Norwegian Seamen's Church, New Orleans, (New Orleans, Louisiana)
- Norwegian Church (Leer, Michigan)
- Christiania Lutheran Free Church, (Eureka Township, Minnesota)
- Nora Free Christian Church, (Hanska, Minnesota)
- Norwegian Lutheran Memorial Church, (Minneapolis, Minnesota)
- Bethany Lutheran Church (Oilmont, Montana)
- Clearwater Evangelical Lutheran Church, (Oklee, Minnesota)
- Trondhjem Norwegian Lutheran Church, ( Rice County, Minnesota)
- Norway Lutheran Church, ( Saint Paul, Minnesota)
- Zion Lutheran Church (Shelly, Minnesota)
- Norwegian Methodist Episcopal Church (Brooklyn, New York)
- Norwegian Seamen's Church, New York, (Manhattan, New York)
- Norway Lutheran Church and Cemetery, (Denbigh, North Dakota)
- Odalen Lutherske Kirke, (Edinburg, North Dakota)
- Viking Lutheran Church, (Maddock, North Dakota)
- Vang Evangelical Lutheran Church (Manfred, North Dakota)
- South Wild Rice Church, (Red River Valley, North Dakota)
- Our Savior's Scandinavian Lutheran Church, (Ward County, North Dakota)
- Calvary Lutheran Church and Parsonage (Silverton, Oregon)
- Aurland United Norwegian Lutheran Church, (Frederick, South Dakota)
- Zoar Norwegian Lutheran Church, ( Grenville, South Dakota)
- Golden Valley Norwegian Lutheran Church, (Ralph, South Dakota)
- Renner Lutheran Church, (Renner, South Dakota)
- Lebanon Lutheran Church, (Summit, South Dakota)
- Our Savior's Lutheran Church (Cranfills Gap, Texas)
- St. Olaf Kirke, (Cranfills Gap, Texas)
- Norwegian Seamen's Church, Houston, (Pasadena, Texas)
- Free Evangelical Lutheran Church-Bethania Scandinavian Evangelical Lutheran Congregation, (Ephraim, Wisconsin)
- Westby Coon-Prairie Lutheran Church, (Westby, Wisconsin)
