= Equality Township =

Equality Township may refer to:

- Equality Township, Gallatin County, Illinois
- Equality Township, Red Lake County, Minnesota
- Equality Township, Miller County, Missouri
