= Lebanon Church =

Lebanon Church may refer to:

- Lebanon Church Road, a section of the Yellow Belt of the Allegheny County Belt System
- Lebanon Church, Virginia

== See also ==
- Lebanon Lutheran Church, in South Dakota
- Lebanon Presbyterian Church, in Mississippi
