= Cranfills Gap High School =

Location
- 505 South 2nd Street; Cranfills Gap, Bosque County, Texas 76637; United States; 31.770268°N 97.824969°W

Information
- School type: Public, high school
- Locale: Rural: Remote
- School district: Cranfills Gap ISD
- Superintendent: Vince Gilbert
- NCES School ID: 481557001129
- Principal: Monti Parchman
- Teaching staff: 16.00 (on an FTE basis)
- Grades: PreK‍–‍12
- Enrollment: 128 (2023‍–‍2024)
- Student to teacher ratio: 8.00
- Colors: Maroon and white
- Team name: Lions
- Website: Official website

Cranfills Gap High School, also known as Cranfills Gap School, is a public high school located in Cranfills Gap, Texas. It is the sole high school in the Cranfills Gap Independent School District and is classified as a 1A school by the University Interscholastic League. During 2022‍–‍2023, Slocum High School had an enrollment of 126 students and a student to teacher ratio of 7.88. The school received an overall rating of "A" from the Texas Education Agency for the 2024‍–‍2025 school year

== Athletics ==
The Cranfills Gap Lions compete in the following sports:

- Basketball
- Cross Country
- 6-Man Football
- Golf
- Tennis
- Track and Field
