= Arnold Wilson Cowen =

American judge

Senior Judge of the United States Court of Appeals for the Federal Circuit
- In office October 1, 1982 – October 28, 2007

Senior Judge of the United States Court of Claims
- In office March 1, 1977 – October 1, 1982

Chief Judge of the United States Court of Claims
- In office July 8, 1964 – March 1, 1977
- Appointed by: Lyndon B. Johnson
- Preceded by: John Marvin Jones
- Succeeded by: Daniel Mortimer Friedman

Personal details
- Born: Arnold Wilson Cowen; December 20, 1905 Norse, Texas
- Died: October 28, 2007 (aged 101) Charlottesville, Virginia
- Education: University of Texas School of Law (LLB)

Arnold Wilson Cowen (December 20, 1905 – October 28, 2007) was a United States circuit judge of the United States Court of Appeals for the Federal Circuit and previously was the chief judge of the United States Court of Claims.

== Education and career ==
Born on December 20, 1905, in Norse, Bosque County, Texas, Cowen received a Bachelor of Laws in 1928 from the University of Texas School of Law. He entered private practice in Dalhart, Texas from 1928 to 1934. He served as a Judge of the Dallam County, Texas Court from 1935 to 1938. He served with the Farm Security Administration of the United States Department of Agriculture from 1938 to 1942, serving as Texas State Director from 1938 to 1939, Associate Division Director from 1939 to 1940, and Region 12 Director from 1940 to 1942. He served as Assistant Administrator of the War Food Administration from 1943 to 1945. He served as Special Assistant to the United States Secretary of Agriculture in 1945.

== Federal judicial service ==
Cowen served as a Trial Judge of the United States Court of Claims from 1942 to 1943, and from 1945 to 1964. He served as Chief of the Trial Division of the United States Court of Claims from 1959 to 1964.

Cowen was nominated by President Lyndon B. Johnson on June 16, 1964, to the Chief Judge seat of the United States Court of Claims vacated by Chief Judge John Marvin Jones. He was confirmed by the United States Senate on July 2, 1964, and received his commission on July 8, 1964. He served as a member of the Judicial Conference of the United States from 1964 to 1976. He assumed senior status on March 1, 1977. He was reassigned by operation of law to the United States Court of Appeals for the Federal Circuit on October 1, 1982, by 96 Stat. 25. His service terminated on October 28, 2007, due to his death in Charlottesville, Virginia.

== Bibliography and sources ==
- The United States Court of Claims : a history / pt. 1. The judges, 1855-1976 / by Marion T. Bennett / pt. 2. Origin, development, jurisdiction, 1855-1978 / W. Cowen, P. Nichols, M.T. Bennett. Washington, D.C.: Committee on the Bicentennial of Independence and the Constitution of the Judicial Conference of the United States. 1976.
- United States Court of Appeals for the Federal Circuit: A History: 1990–2002 / compiled by members of the Advisory Council to the United States Court of Appeals for the Federal Circuit in celebration of the court's twentieth anniversary. Washington, D.C.: U.S. Court of Appeals for the Federal Circuit. 2004.
- Surviving the Dustbowl, at PBS's website, accessed on 3/12/2007.
- "The American Experience" Surviving the Dust Bowl (1998) at IMDb

Legal offices
Preceded by John Marvin Jones	Chief Judge of the United States Court of Claims; 1964–1977	Succeeded by Daniel Mortimer Friedman
