= Rock Springs, Bosque County, Texas =

- Ghost town
- Location within Texas Location within the United States
- Coordinates: 31°41′10″N 97°25′00″W
- Country: United States
- State: Texas
- County: Bosque
- Elevation: 627 ft (191 m)
- Time zone: UTC-6 (Central (CST))
  - Summer (DST): UTC-5 (CDT)
- Area code: 254
- GNIS feature ID: 1380907

Rock Springs is a ghost town in Bosque County, in the U.S. state of Texas.

== History ==
Rock Springs also went by the name The Colony and was the only predominantly black community in the county.

== Geography ==
Rock Springs was located on Farm to Market Road 1367 in south-central Bosque County, near the McLennan County line.

== Education ==
James Sadler was an educator and built a school on his land grant. Today, Rock Springs is located within the Cranfills Gap Independent School District.
