= Our Savior's Lutheran Church (Cranfills Gap, Texas) =

Historic place in Clifton, Bosque County, Texas

Coordinates: 31°46′21″N 97°40′43″W

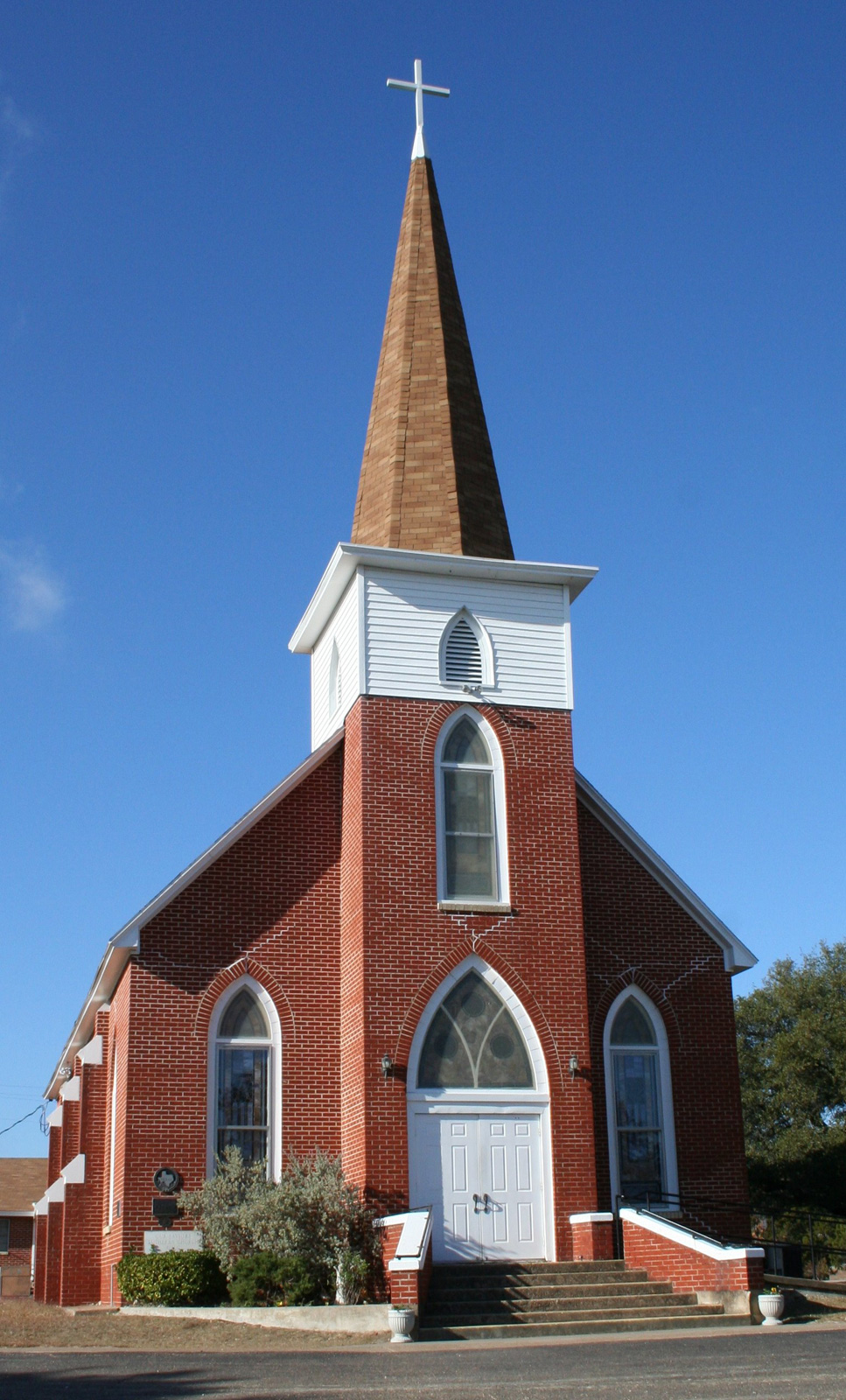
Our Savior's Lutheran Church at Norse

Our Savior's Lutheran Church, (Norwegian:Vår Frelsers Kirke) is a Lutheran church located near the cities of Clifton and Cranfills Gap in the unincorporated community of Norse in Bosque County, Texas, US.

== History ==
The congregation for Our Savior's Lutheran Church at Norse was organized on June 14, 1869 by Norwegian settlers of Bosque County, Texas. The church itself was constructed between 1875 and 1885. As the congregation grew, it became necessary to build another church in the western part of the Norwegian immigrant settlement. That church, St. Olaf Kirke, started as an extension of the Our Savior's Lutheran congregation upon completion of the church in 1886, but eventually became an independent congregation in 1902.

Monument to the Original Norwegian Settlers, located just outside the church

The cemetery on the church property serves as the burial site for a number of original Norwegian settlers of the area, including Cleng Peerson, commonly referred to was the father of Norwegian immigration to the United States. Today a portion of Texas 219 in Bosque County is named the Cleng Peerson Memorial Highway.

The area around the communities of Norse, Clifton, and Cranfills Gap is known as the Norse Historical District. Recently a monument was constructed just outside the church's cemetery recognizing the 17 original Norwegian settlers of Bosque County.

== Recent history ==
In October 1962, Our Savior's Lutheran Church at Norse was awarded the Texas Historical Building Medallion and has been recorded as a historical landmark of cultural significance by the State of Texas. Our Savior's Lutheran Church continues to be used for regular church services. The current pastor is the Rev. Dr. Ruth E. Hetland. The congregation consists of nearly 300 members and is currently affiliated with the Northern Texas-Northern Louisiana Synod of the Evangelical Lutheran Church in America.

== Other sources ==
- Lovell, Odd S. (1984) The Promise of America: A History of the Norwegian-American People (Minneapolis: The University of Minnesota Press) ISBN 0-8166-1331-1
- Pool, William C. (1964) Bosque Territory: A History of an Agrarian Community (Kyle, Texas: Chaparral Press)
- Pierson, Oris E. (1979) Norwegian Settlements in Bosque County (Clifton, Texas: Bosque Memorial Museum)
