= Daniel Mortimer Friedman =

American judge (1916–2011)

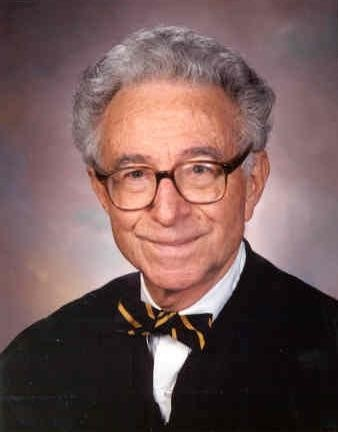

Senior Judge of the United States Court of Appeals for the Federal Circuit
- In office November 1, 1989 – July 6, 2011

Judge of the United States Court of Appeals for the Federal Circuit
- In office October 1, 1982 – November 1, 1989
- Appointed by: operation of law
- Preceded by: Seat established by 96 Stat. 25
- Succeeded by: Alan David Lourie

Chief Judge of the United States Court of Claims
- In office May 19, 1978 – October 1, 1982
- Appointed by: Jimmy Carter
- Preceded by: Arnold Wilson Cowen
- Succeeded by: Seat abolished

Acting Solicitor General of the United States
- In office January 20, 1977 – March 28, 1977
- President: Jimmy Carter
- Preceded by: Robert Bork
- Succeeded by: Wade H. McCree

Personal details
- Born: Daniel Mortimer Friedman; February 8, 1916 New York City, U.S.
- Died: July 6, 2011 (aged 95) Washington, D.C., U.S.
- Political party: Democratic
- Spouse: Elizabeth Ellis
- Children: 4 stepchildren
- Education: Columbia University (AB, LLB)

Daniel Mortimer Friedman (February 8, 1916 – July 6, 2011) was a United States circuit judge of the United States Court of Appeals for the Federal Circuit and previously was chief judge of the United States Court of Claims.

== Education and career ==
Born in New York City, New York, Friedman received an Artium Baccalaureus degree from Columbia University in 1937, and a Bachelor of Laws from Columbia Law School in 1940. He entered private practice in New York City until 1942, and was briefly an attorney for the Securities and Exchange Commission in Philadelphia, Pennsylvania and Washington, D.C. in 1942. He joined the United States Army in September 1942 and was in the Quartermaster Corps, including service in Europe during World War II. He was discharged in February 1946 as a master sergeant.

Following his military service, he returned to the Securities and Exchange Commission until 1951, when he became assistant chief of the appellate section of the Antitrust Division in the United States Department of Justice, in Washington, D.C. In 1959, he joined the Office of the United States Solicitor General, serving as an assistant to the solicitor general from 1959 to 1962, then as a second assistant to the solicitor general until 1968, and then as first deputy solicitor general until 1978. He was the Acting United States Solicitor General in 1977.

== Federal judicial service ==
On March 22, 1978, Friedman was nominated by President Jimmy Carter to become Chief judge of the United States Court of Claims, to the seat vacated by Chief Judge Arnold Wilson Cowen. Friedman was confirmed by the United States Senate on May 17, 1978, and received his commission on May 19, 1978. When the Court of Claims was abolished during the Reagan Administration he was reassigned on October 1, 1982, by operation of the Federal Courts Improvement Act, 96 Stat. 25, to be a United States Circuit Judge of the United States Court of Appeals for the Federal Circuit. He assumed senior status on November 1, 1989, and served in that capacity until his death on July 6, 2011, in Washington, D.C.

== Legacy ==
In cooperation with former clerks of Friedman, the Federal Circuit Bar Association in 2012 established the Friedman Memorial Committee to honor Friedman's memory, spirit, and accomplishments. The Committee organizes a prestigious annual lecture, the Judge Daniel M. Friedman Appellate Lecture, to advance the field of appellate advocacy. The first annual lecture on November 16, 2012, featured Chief Judge Frank H. Easterbrook of the United States Court of Appeals for the Seventh Circuit.

== Sources ==
- FJC Court of Federal Claims biography of Daniel M. Friedman
- United States Court of Appeals for the Federal Circuit: A History: 1990–2002 / compiled by members of the Advisory Council to the United States Court of Appeals for the Federal Circuit in celebration of the court's twentieth anniversary. Washington, D.C.: U.S. Court of Appeals for the Federal Circuit. 2004. LCCN 2004050209.

Legal offices
| Preceded by Robert Bork | Solicitor General of the United States; Acting; 1977 | Succeeded by Wade H. McCree |
| Preceded by Arnold Wilson Cowen | Chief Judge of the United States Court of Claims; 1978–1982 | Succeeded by Seat abolished |
| Preceded by Seat established by 96 Stat. 25 | Judge of the United States Court of Appeals for the Federal Circuit; 1982–1989 | Succeeded by Alan David Lourie |
