= John Marvin Jones =

American politician and jurist

Marvin Jones
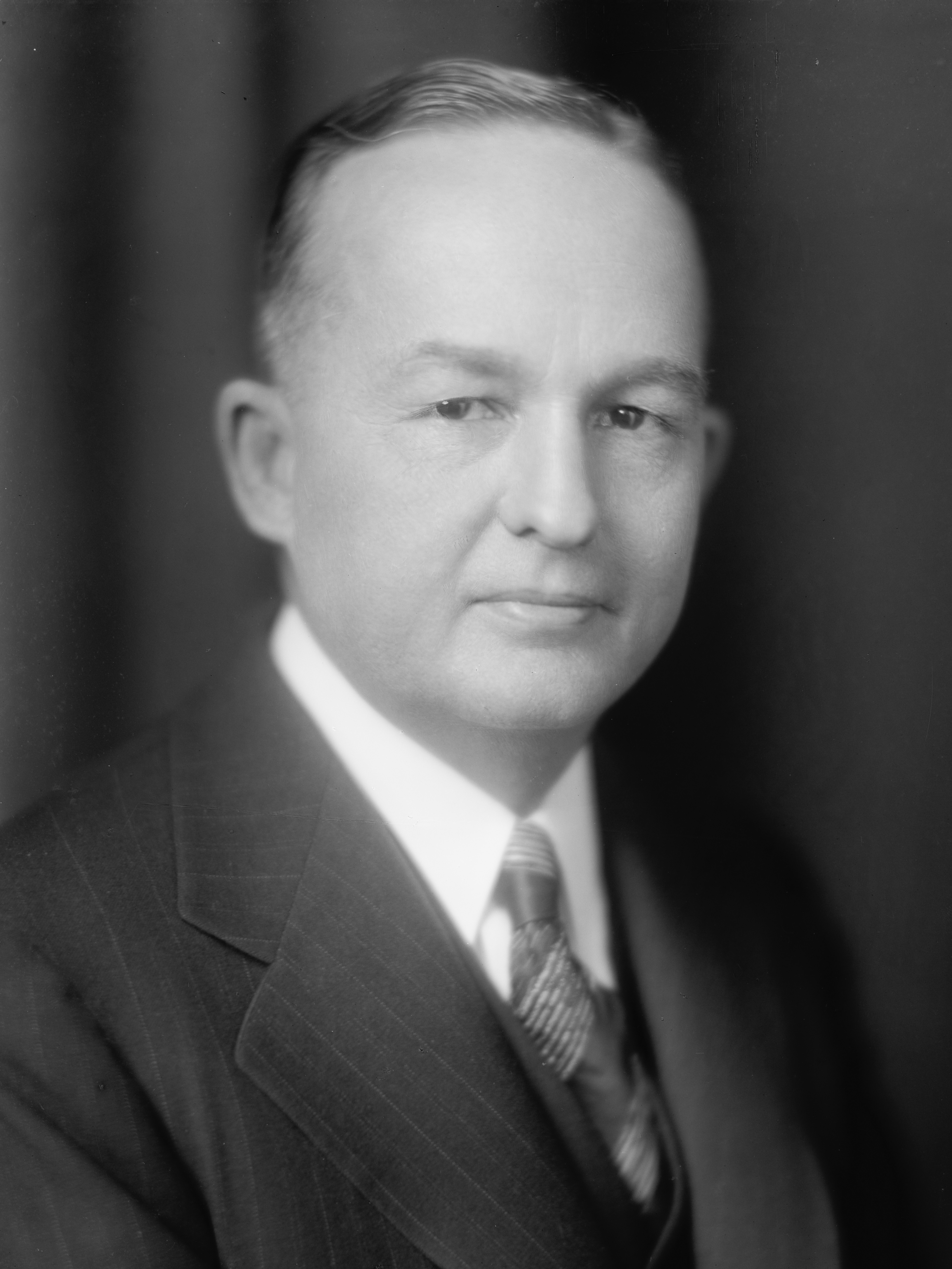

Senior Judge of the United States Court of Claims
- In office July 14, 1964 – March 4, 1976

Chief Judge of the United States Court of Claims
- In office September 1, 1948 – July 14, 1964
- Preceded by: Seat established
- Succeeded by: Arnold Wilson Cowen

Chief Justice of the Court of Claims
- In office July 9, 1947 – September 1, 1948
- Appointed by: Harry S. Truman
- Preceded by: Richard S. Whaley
- Succeeded by: Seat abolished

Administrator of the War Food Administration
- In office June 29, 1943 – July 1, 1945
- President: Franklin D. Roosevelt; Harry S. Truman
- Preceded by: Position established
- Succeeded by: Position abolished

Judge of the Court of Claims
- In office November 20, 1940 – July 9, 1947; On leave: January 15, 1943 – July 1, 1945
- Appointed by: Franklin D. Roosevelt
- Preceded by: Thomas Sutler Williams
- Succeeded by: George Evan Howell

Chair of the House Agriculture Committee
- In office March 4, 1931 – November 20, 1940
- Preceded by: Gilbert N. Haugen
- Succeeded by: Hampton P. Fulmer

Member of the U.S. House of Representatives from Texas
- In office March 4, 1917 – November 20, 1940
- Preceded by: John Hall Stephens
- Succeeded by: Eugene Worley
- Constituency: 13th district (1917–1919); 18th district (1919–1940)

Personal details
- Born: John Marvin Jones; February 26, 1882 Valley View, Texas, U.S.
- Died: March 4, 1976 (aged 94) Amarillo, Texas, U.S.
- Resting place: Llano Cemetery
- Party: Democratic
- Education: John B. Denton College (BA); Southwestern University (BPhil); University of Texas, Austin (LLB)

John Marvin Jones (February 26, 1882 – March 4, 1976) was a United States representative from Texas and a Judge of the United States Court of Claims.

== Education and career ==
Born on February 26, 1882, in Valley View, Cooke County, Texas, Jones attended the common schools and then received a Bachelor of Arts degree in 1902 from John B. Denton College (now defunct), a Bachelor of Philosophy degree in 1905 from Southwestern University and a Bachelor of Laws in 1907 from the University of Texas School of Law and was admitted to the bar the same year. He entered private practice in Amarillo, Texas from 1908 to 1917. He was a member of the Texas Board of Legal Examiners for the Seventh Supreme Judicial District in 1913. He was a member of the Democratic National Congressional Campaign Committee. He was a United States Army private in Company A of the 308th Battalion of the Tank Corps in 1918.

== Congressional service ==
Jones was elected as a Democrat to the 65th United States Congress and was reelected to the eleven succeeding Congresses and served from March 4, 1917, until his resignation on November 20, 1940, to become a judge of the United States Court of Claims. He was Chairman of the United States House Committee on Agriculture for the 72nd United States Congress through the 76th United States Congress.

== Federal judicial service ==
Jones was nominated by President Franklin D. Roosevelt on April 9, 1940, to a Judge seat on the Court of Claims vacated by Judge Thomas Sutler Williams. He was confirmed by the United States Senate on April 10, 1940, and received his commission on November 20, 1940. His service terminated on July 9, 1947, due to his elevation to be Chief Justice of the same court.

Jones was on leave from the U.S. Court of Claims from 1943 to 1945, during his service as U.S. War Food Administrator.

Jones was nominated by President Harry S. Truman on January 20, 1947, to the Chief Justice seat on the Court of Claims vacated by Chief Justice Richard S. Whaley. He was confirmed by the Senate on July 8, 1947, and received his commission on July 9, 1947. Jones was reassigned by operation of law to the newly created Chief Judge seat on the renamed United States Court of Claims on September 1, 1948, pursuant to 62 Stat. 898. Jones was initially appointed as a Judge under Article I, but the court was raised to Article III status by operation of law on July 28, 1953, and Jones thereafter served as an Article III Judge. He was a member of the Judicial Conference of the United States from 1956 to 1964. He assumed senior status on July 14, 1964. His service terminated on March 4, 1976, due to his death in Amarillo. He was interred in Llano Cemetery.

== Other service ==
Jones was on leave from the United States Court of Claims beginning January 15, 1943, to serve as adviser and assistant to the Director of the Office of Economic Stabilization until June 29, 1943, when he was appointed Administrator of the War Food Administration of the United States Department of Agriculture, serving until July 1, 1945, when he resumed his duties on the United States Court of Claims.

Jones served as a Special Master for the United States Supreme Court for Mississippi and Louisiana in 1965.

== Honor ==
In 1980, President Jimmy Carter signed a bill naming Amarillo's federal court building the J. Marvin Jones Federal Building.

== Bibliography and sources ==
- Thompson, Bette (February 13, 1976). "Amarillo Profiles". Amarillo Globe-Times. p. 37. "Now, preparing to celebrate his 94th birthday on Feb. 26, fragile health confines [Jones] to the area which was ever present in his mind while he bent his efforts for its people.""
- The United States Court of Claims : a history / pt. 1. The judges, 1855–1976 / by Marion T. Bennett / pt. 2. Origin, development, jurisdiction, 1855–1978 / W. Cowen, P. Nichols, M.T. Bennett. Washington, D.C.: Committee on the Bicentennial of Independence and the Constitution of the Judicial Conference of the United States. 1976.
- May, Irvin M. (1980). Marvin Jones, the public life of an agrarian advocate. College Station: Texas A&M University Press. ISBN 978-1-58544-029-0.
- Jones, Marvin (1973). Memoirs; 1917-1973, fifty-six years of continuing service in all three branches of the Federal Government. Edited and annotated by Joseph M. Ray. El Paso: Texas Western Press.

U.S. House of Representatives
Preceded by John Hall Stephens	Member of the U.S. House of Representatives from Texas's 13th congressional district 1917–1919	Succeeded by Lucian W. Parrish
Preceded by District established	Member of the U.S. House of Representatives from Texas's 18th congressional district 1919–1940	Succeeded by Eugene Worley
Political offices
Preceded by Gilbert N. Haugen	Chairman of the House Agriculture Committee; 1931–1941	Succeeded by Hampton P. Fulmer
Legal offices
Preceded by Thomas Sutler Williams	Judge of the Court of Claims; 1940–1947	Succeeded by George Evan Howell
Preceded by Richard S. Whaley	Chief Justice of the Court of Claims; 1947–1948	Succeeded by Seat abolished
Preceded by Seat established by 62 Stat. 898	Chief Judge of the United States Court of Claims; 1948–1964	Succeeded by Arnold Wilson Cowen
