= Leer Lutheran Church =

Historic church in Michigan, United States

- Norwegian Lutheran Church Complex
- U.S. National Register of Historic Places
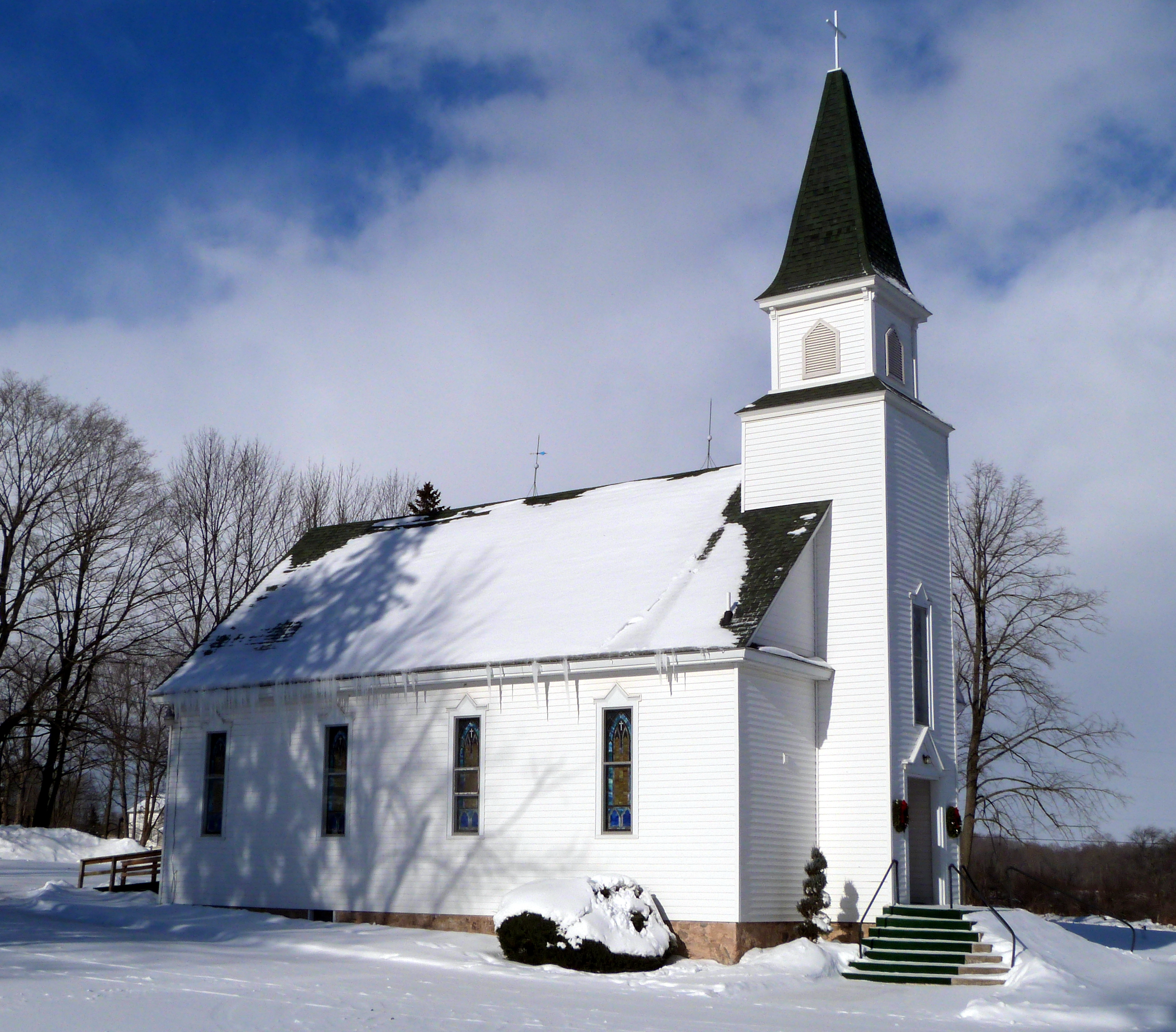

- Location within Michigan Location within the United States
- Interactive map
- Location: 10430 S. Leer Rd., near Leer in Long Rapids Township
- Coordinates: 45°11′50″N 83°43′11″W
- Built: 1899
- Built by: Joseph F. Bammel
- Architectural style: vernacular Gothic Revival
- NRHP reference No.: 13000478
- Added to NRHP: July 9, 2013

The Leer Lutheran Church, also known as the Norwegian Lutheran Church, is a church located at 10430 South Leer Road, near Leer in Long Rapids Township, Michigan. The church grounds include a parish house, cemetery, and pavilion, as well as the church itself. The church is substantially the same as when it was built. Highlights include an altar painting by Sarah Kirkeberg Raugland, and an unusual pressed metal interior in the parish house. It was listed on the National Register of Historic Places in 2013.

== History ==
By the 1870s, the town of Alpena had a sizable Norwegian community, many members of which had recently emigrated from Lier, Norway. With money from their lumbering jobs, members of the community purchased nearby land and founded the community of Leer, with the first permanent settlers arriving in the town in 1879. In 1882, a Norwegian Lutheran Church Society was organized in Leer at the home of Andreas and Gunhild Christopherson. The Reverend Peder lsberg, pastor of the Norwegian Lutheran congregation in Alpena, agreed to travel to Leer four times yearly for services. The Leer congregation met in a local school, and started a building fund with the intention of constructing a church.

In 1883, the congregation purchased a plot of land for $1.00 from Karl Burud, on the condition that it be used for a church and cemetery. The first burial in the cemetery occurred in 1885. By 1898, the fund drive was nearing completion, and a building committee was appointed to determine construction details. The final design was based on a German Lutheran church (no longer extant) located in nearby Krakow Township in Presque Isle County. The cornerstone of the church was laid on September 7, 1899, and the remainder of the church was constructed by carpenter Joseph F. Bammel for $3,000. It was completed in 1900.

In 1916, a parish house was constructed for $800. The parish house served as the social and educational center of the congregation. The church was modernized in the 1930s and 1940s, with the addition of electrification, a water system, and updated heating. Stained glass windows were installed in 1941–42. A single-story addition to the parish house was constructed in 1963. As of 2014, the church is still being used for services.

== Description ==
The Norwegian Lutheran Church is a rectangular wood-frame vernacular Gothic Revival church, measuring 50 feet (15 m) by 31 feet (9.4 m), with a gable roof and a fieldstone and concrete foundation. It has a centrally positioned, rectangular bell tower 63 feet (19 m) high that projects from the front facade. The church entrance is in the base of the tower and is reached via a set of concrete steps. Above the entrance is a single stained glass window. Similar windows line the longer sides of the church. The church was originally constructed of local materials, but is presently clad in white vinyl siding.

Inside the church entrance is a small vestibule, along with a cry room and restroom (converted from a former coat room), beyond which is the entrance to the nave. The nave has two rows of eight oak pews with a center aisle. In the front are the chancel, altar, and pulpit, which are flanked by the pastor's dressing room, and another vestibule leading to a rear exit. A balcony is in the rear of the church. The original wood floor is covered with carpeting. The altar painting, Crucifixion, by Sarah Kirkeberg Raugland, is attached to the rear wall of the chancel.

A two-story parish house is situated adjacent to the church. It is a wood-frame structure with a gambrel roof and concrete block foundation, approximately 40 feet (12 m) by 27 feet (8.2 m). It is clad with vinyl siding, and has a main entrance reached by ten concrete steps. A later single-story addition projects to one side.

The upper floor of the historic section of the parish house is a single open space, and is in substantially original condition. The walls and ceiling are covered with elaborate embossed and painted pressed metal panels. The metal panels form wainscoting and an upper rail, and transition to different patterns above the rail. An oak staircase connects the upper floor to the lower. The lower floor, which has been significantly modernized, houses a kitchen, dining and social space, bathroom, and a small office.

The cemetery fronts the church property, and contains upright, flat, and obelisk headstones, crafted from granite and marble. Various cedars, yews, pines, and shrubs area scattered throughout the property. A modern pavilion is also located near the church. This structure is an open air gabled structure, with the roof supported by wooden posts sitting on a concrete pad, and an enclosed kitchen and utility facility on one end. The pavilion is modern, built to take the place of the original horse stalls.

== See also ==
- List of Norwegian churches in the United States
- National Register of Historic Places listings in Alpena County, Michigan
