= St. Olaf Kirke =

Church building in Texas, United States of America

Coordinates: 31°47′31″N 97°46′26″W

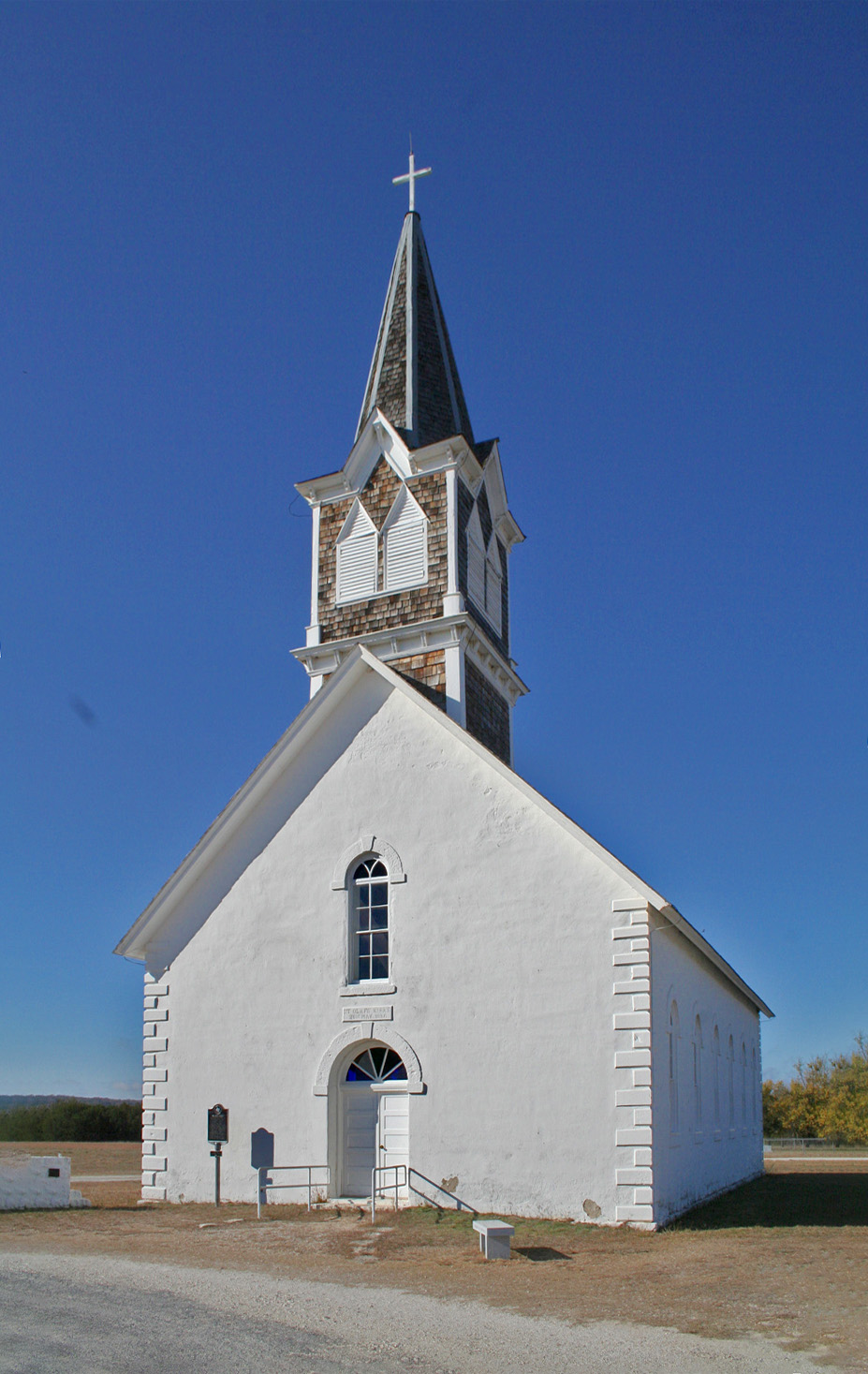
St. Olaf Kirke

St. Olaf Kirke, commonly referred to as The Rock Church, is a small Lutheran church located outside of Cranfills Gap, Texas, United States, in an unincorporated rural community known as Norse in Bosque County, Texas. The Church is affiliated with the Evangelical Lutheran Church in America.

== Background ==
St. Olaf Kirke is situated on a rise overlooking Meridian Creek Valley, four miles east of Cranfills Gap. The church was constructed in 1884 on land purchased for $25. Designed and built in 1886 by Andrew Mickelson, St. Olaf Kirke served a community of Norwegian settlers who farmed on area lands. With the help of Mickelson's brothers, Christian and Ole, as well as many local farmers, limestone was quarried from the surrounding hills to build the church. Originally, the church's floor consisted of little more than dirt and the pews were constructed of planks laid upon wooden kegs.

While the church originally functioned as an extension of the Our Savior's Lutheran Church congregation located just six miles east, the growth of the community resulted in St. Olaf Kirke becoming an independent congregation in 1902. Norwegian was the primary language used during church services, although some English services were held as well. The church continued to be used for regular Sunday church services until 1917 when St. Olaf Lutheran Church was built in Cranfills Gap.

== Recent history ==
Today, St. Olaf Kirke serves as a historical landmark with special significance for the descendants of the Norwegian settlers of the area. Special events, such as weddings and funerals, continue to be held in the church. The church was designated a historical landmark by the Texas Historical Commission in 1974 and was entered into the National Register of Historic Places in 1983.

Due to the community's strong ties to its original Norwegian heritage, this area was visited King Olav V of Norway on October 10, 1982. The King came to commemorate the birth of Cleng Peerson who is buried in the Norse Cemetery. At that time the King also visited St. Olaf Kirke which is located nearby.

== Gallery ==
Altar

Baptismal Font

Historical Marker

== Other sources ==
- Blegen, Theodore C. (1969)Norwegian Migration to America (New York: Haskell House)
- Flom, George T. (1909) A History of Norwegian Immigration to the United States: from the earliest beginning down to the year 1848 ( Iowa City< Iowa)
- Lovell, Odd S. (1984) The Promise of America: A History of the Norwegian-American People (Minneapolis: The University of Minnesota Press) ISBN 0-8166-1331-1
- Nelson, E. Clifford; Fevold, Eugene L. (1960) The Lutheran Church among Norwegian-Americans: a history of the Evangelical Lutheran Church (Minneapolis: Augsburg Publishing House)
