= Equality Township, Miller County, Missouri =

Township in Miller County, Missouri, U.S.

Coordinates: 38.2192°N 92.4958°W

Equality Township is an inactive township in Miller County, in the U.S. state of Missouri.

Equality Township was established in 1837, and named for the virtue of equality.

== Demographics ==
In the 2020 United States census, Equality Township had an estimated population of 1,004 residents. The ratio of males per 100 females for Equality Township was 108.2. 22.3% of the towns population was under the age of 18 and the median age in the township was 46.3. 93.3% of the town was classified as White, 3.5% as Black or African American, 1.2% 2 or more races, and 0.6% Hispanic. The median income in USD in 2020 was $33,947 per person. An estimated 3.5% of the town lives below the poverty level.
