= Manfred, North Dakota =

- Unincorporated community
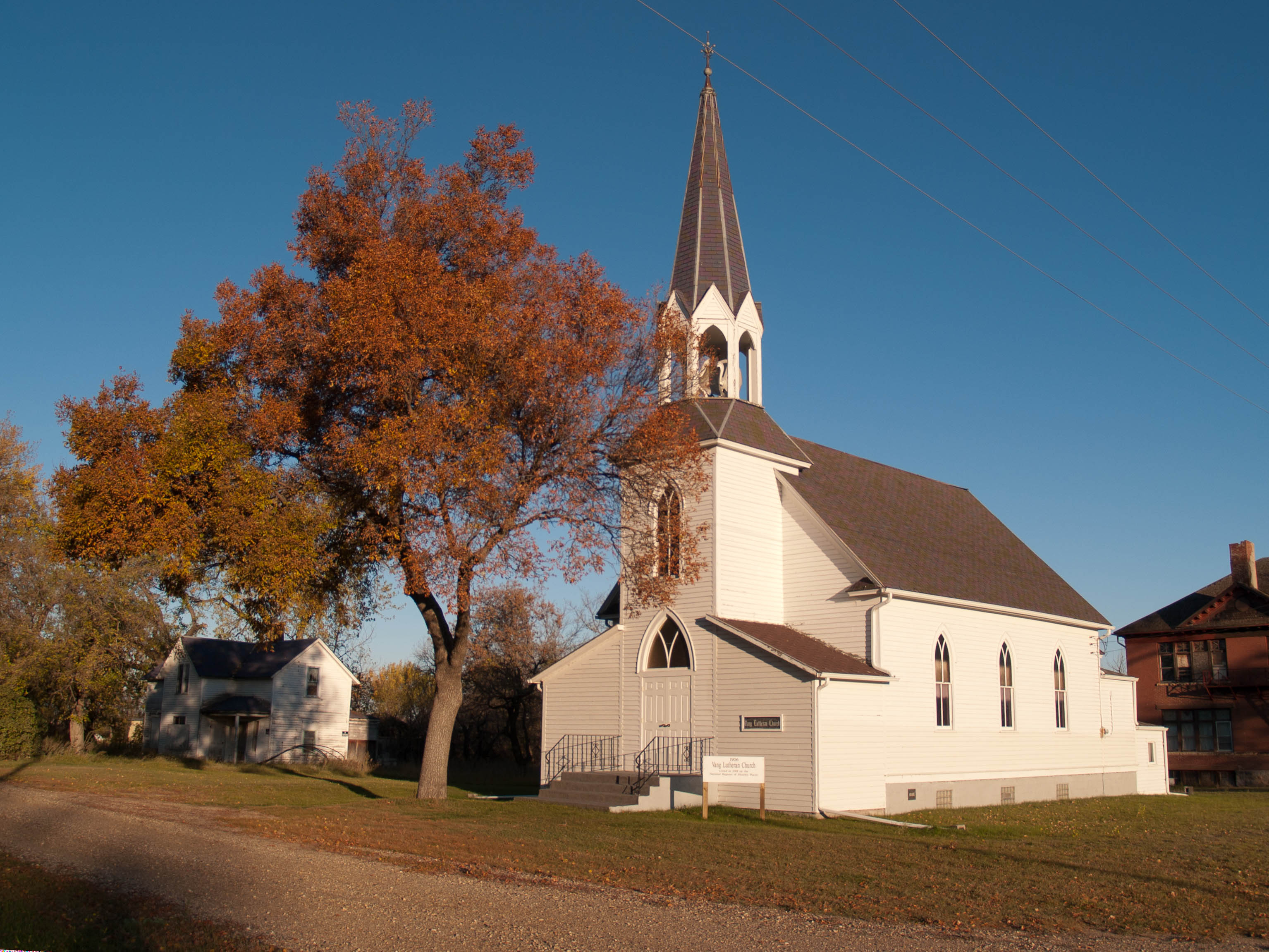
- Vang Evangelical Lutheran Church in Manfred

- Location within North Dakota Location within the United States
- Coordinates: 47°41′41″N 99°44′53″W
- Country: United States
- State: North Dakota
- County: Wells
- Elevation: 1,601 ft (488 m)
- Time zone: UTC-6 (Central (CST))
  - Summer (DST): UTC-5 (CDT)
- Area code: 701
- GNIS feature ID: 1030081

Manfred is an unincorporated community in Wells County, North Dakota, United States. Manfred is located along U.S. Route 52 and the Canadian Pacific Railway, 10.1 miles (16.3 km) east-southeast of Harvey. The Vang Evangelical Lutheran Church, which is listed on the National Register of Historic Places, is located in Manfred.
