= Vang Evangelical Lutheran Church =

Historic church in North Dakota, United States

- U.S. National Register of Historic Places
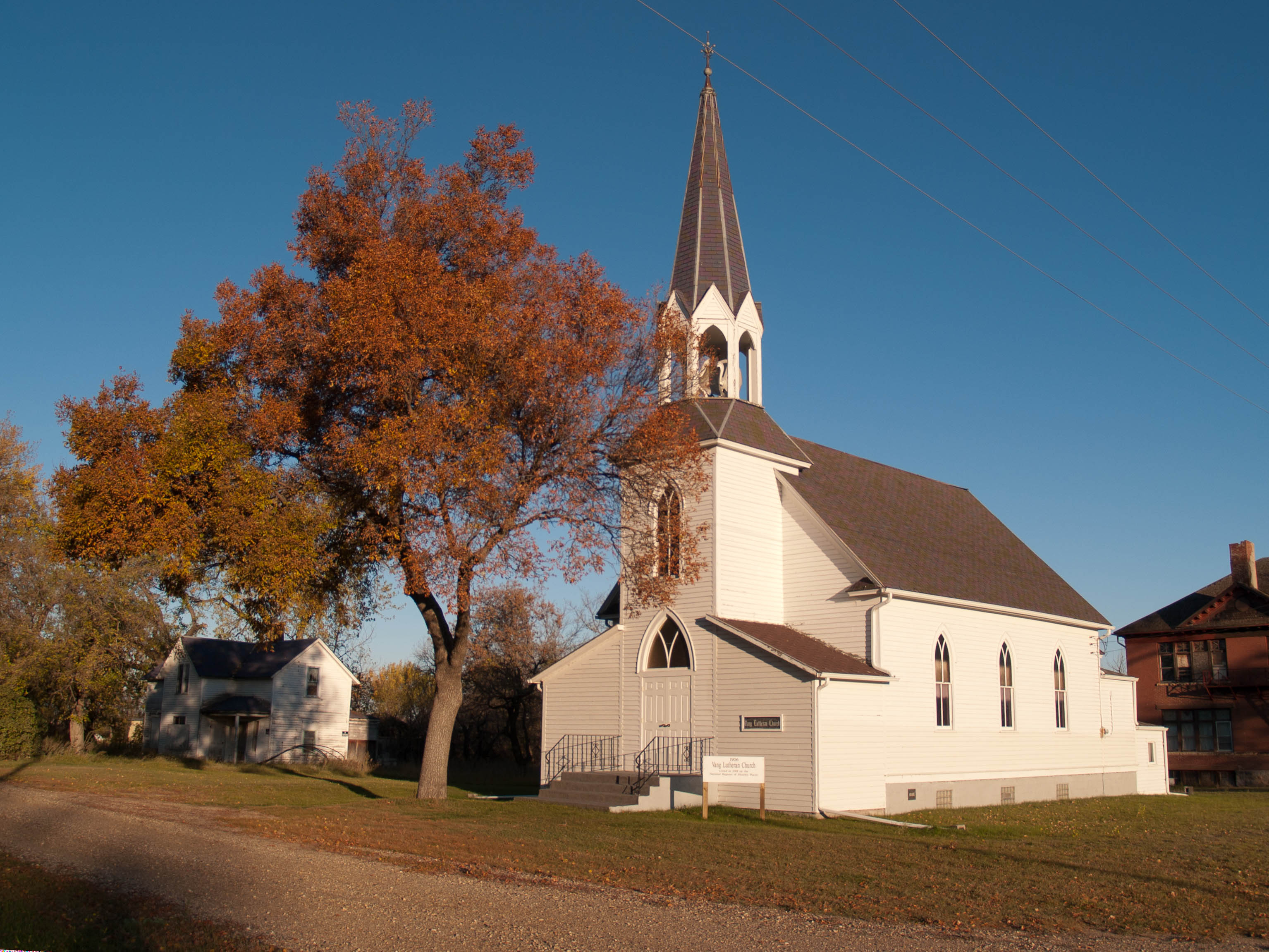

- Location within North Dakota Location within the United States
- Location: 200 W. LeGrand St., Manfred, North Dakota
- Coordinates: 47°41′43″N 99°45′2″W
- Area: less than one acre
- Built: 1906
- Architect: Fanning, W.; et al.
- Architectural style: Late Gothic Revival
- NRHP reference No.: 01000674
- Added to NRHP: June 21, 2001

The Vang Evangelical Lutheran Church is a historic church located in Wells County, North Dakota.

Vang Evangelical Lutheran Church was built in 1906 by immigrants from Norway. It is situated at West LeGrand St. in the small unorganized village of Manfred, North Dakota and is affiliated with the Evangelical Lutheran Church in America. During 2011, the church became a listed building on the National Register of Historic Places (NRHP).
