= War Food Administration =

U.S. government agency

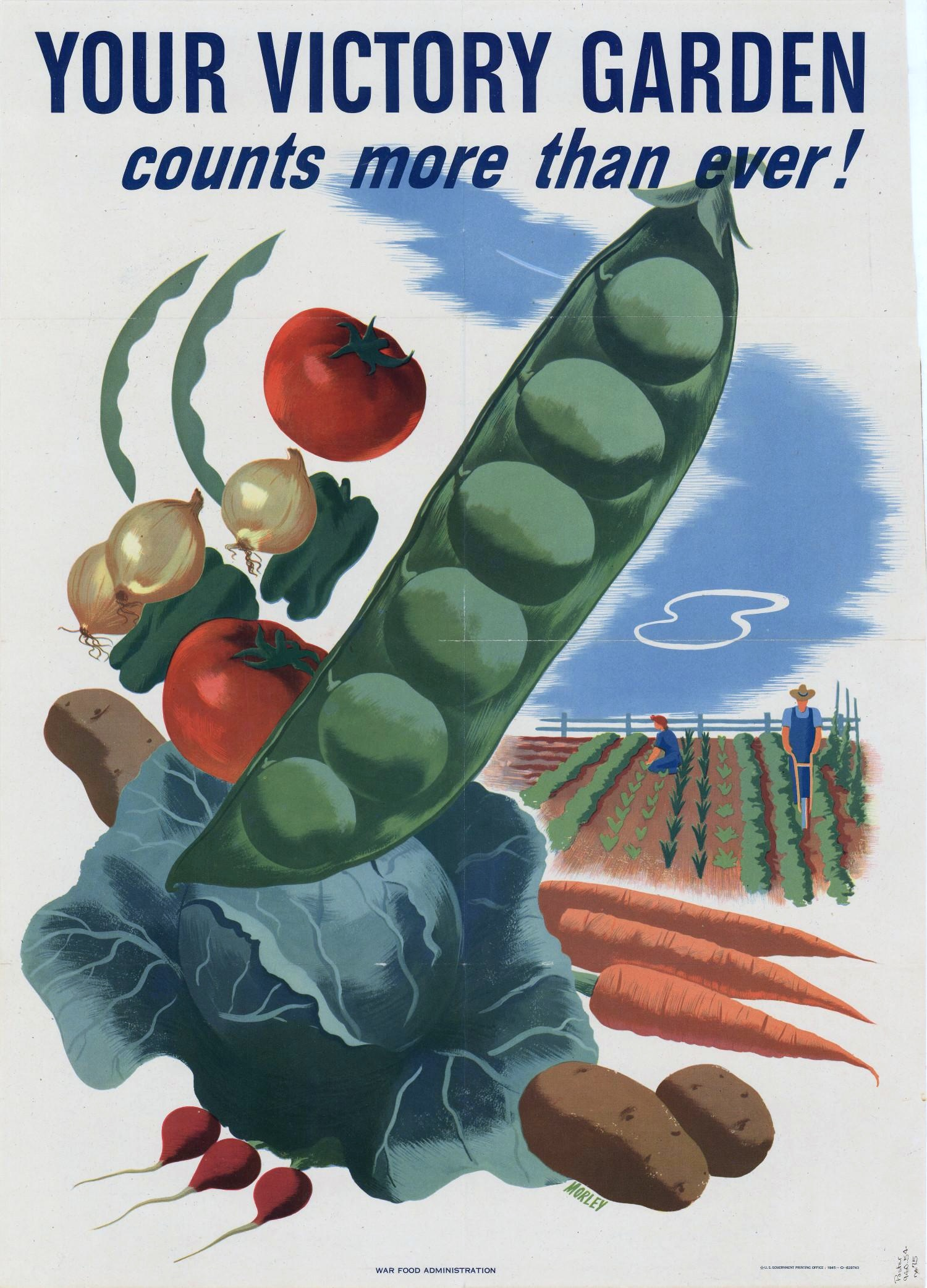
Poster for the National Victory Garden Program

The War Food Administration was a United States government agency that existed from 1943 to 1945. The War Food Administration was responsible for the production and distribution of food to meet war and essential civilian needs during World War II. It was a predecessor of the Farm Service Agency.

The agency helped create school lunch programs in the United States, and administered farm labor programs.

== Functions ==
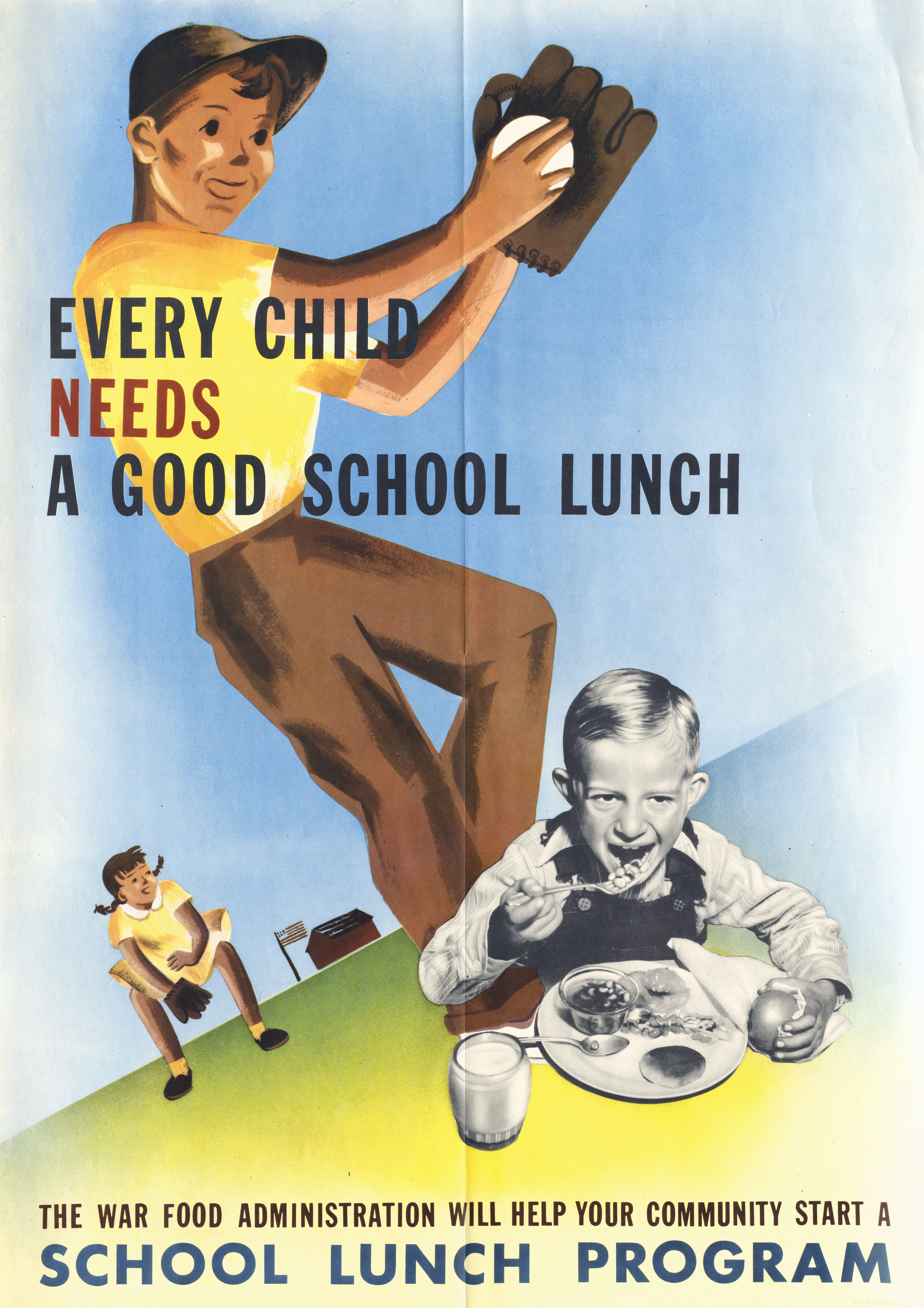
Poster promoting the development of school lunch programs

The War Food Administration was established by Executive Order 9322 of March 26, 1943 (amended by Executive Order 9334 of April 19, 1943). It was under the direction of the War Food Administrator, who was appointed by and was responsible to the President.

Marvin Jones was appointed War Food Administrator by President Franklin D. Roosevelt and led the agency from 1943 to 1945.

The War Food Administrator determined the direct and indirect, military, other governmental, civilian, and foreign requirements for human and animal food, and for food used industrially; formulated and implemented a program to supply food adequate to meet the requirements; allocated the Nation's farm production resources as needed; assigned priorities and makes allocations of food for all uses; insured the efficient and proper distribution of the available food supply; and made recommendations to the Chairman of the War Production Board covering the quantities and types of nonfood materials, supplies, and equipment required to carry out the program of the War Food Administration.

The Administrator determined the need and amount of food available for civilian rationing, exercising his priorities and allocation powers in this connection through the Office of Price Administration.

The War Food Administrator also had responsibility for farm labor supply and farm wage and salary stabilization.

== Administrative history ==
The National Archives website describes the origins of this agency as follows:

The Agricultural Adjustment Administration was established under the Agricultural Adjustment Act (48 Stat. 31), May 12, 1933. It was reorganized under the Soil Conservation and Domestic Allotment Act (49 Stat. 1148), February 29, 1936. It was redesignated the Agricultural Adjustment Agency and consolidated with the Sugar Agency, Federal Crop Insurance Corporation, and Soil Conservation Service into Agricultural Conservation and Adjustment Administration by EO 9069, February 23, 1942. It was assigned to Food Production Administration by EO 9280, December 5, 1942; and to Administration of Food Production and Distribution by EO 9322, March 26, 1943, renamed War Food Administration by EO 9334, April 19, 1943. Its functions reverted to the Secretary of Agriculture when War Food Administration abolished by EO 9577, June 29, 1945. It was subsequently assigned to the Production and Marketing Administration by Secretary's Memorandum 1118, August 18, 1945.

The Office of Labor was established in the War Food Administration (WFA), effective June 23, 1943, by Administrator's directive, June 21, 1943. It administered wartime farm labor activities of the Department of Agriculture. It was abolished concurrently with the WFA by EO 9577, June 29, 1945. Its successor agencies were the Office of the Secretary of Agriculture (July-Aug. 1945), and the Labor Branch, Production and Marketing Administration (PMA, Aug. 1945–1948).
