= Zoar Norwegian Lutheran Church =

Historic church in South Dakota, United States

- U.S. National Register of Historic Places
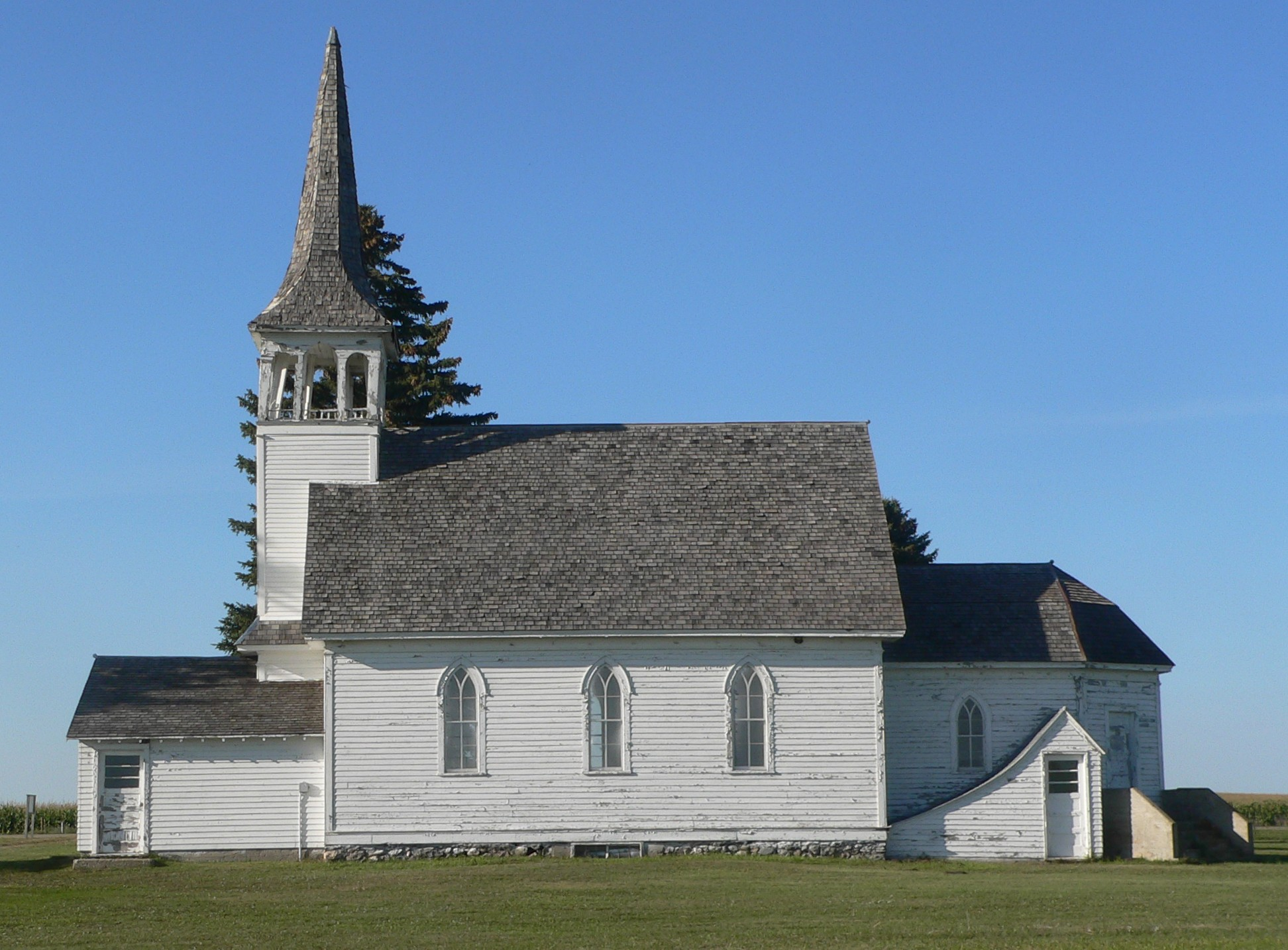

- Location within South Dakota Location within the United States
- Nearest city: Grenville, South Dakota
- Coordinates: 45.543368°N 97.239633°W
- Architectural style: Gothic Revival
- NRHP reference No.: 90001644
- Added to NRHP: October 25, 1990

The Zoar Norwegian Lutheran Church is a historic church in rural northeastern Day County, South Dakota. It is a modest wood-frame structure, set on a rise south of County Road 4 northeast of Pickerel Lake. It has Gothic Revival styling, and a bell tower capped by a steeple with flared roof. Built in 1904, it is one of a few surviving period country churches in the region, and is distinctive for its use by a Norwegian-American community in an area predominantly populated by Polish immigrants.

The church was listed on the National Register of Historic Places in 1990.
