= Cranfills Gap Independent School District =

School district in Texas

Coordinates: 31.79538°N 97.82820°W

Cranfills Gap Independent School District is a public school district based in Cranfills Gap, Texas (USA).

Located in Bosque County, a portion of the district extends into Hamilton County.

Cranfills Gap ISD has one school that serves students in grades pre-kindergarten through twelve.

== School ==
- Cranfills Gap School - PreK-12 Grade School that serves the entire CGISD.

== Academic achievement ==
In 2009, the school district was rated "recognized" by the Texas Education Agency.

== Special programs ==
=== Athletics ===
Cranfills Gap High School plays six-man football. At a mere 24 students it is the smallest public school playing football in Texas.

== See also ==
- List of school districts in Texas
- List of high schools in Texas
