= Trondhjem Norwegian Lutheran Church =

Historic church in Minnesota, United States

- U.S. National Register of Historic Places
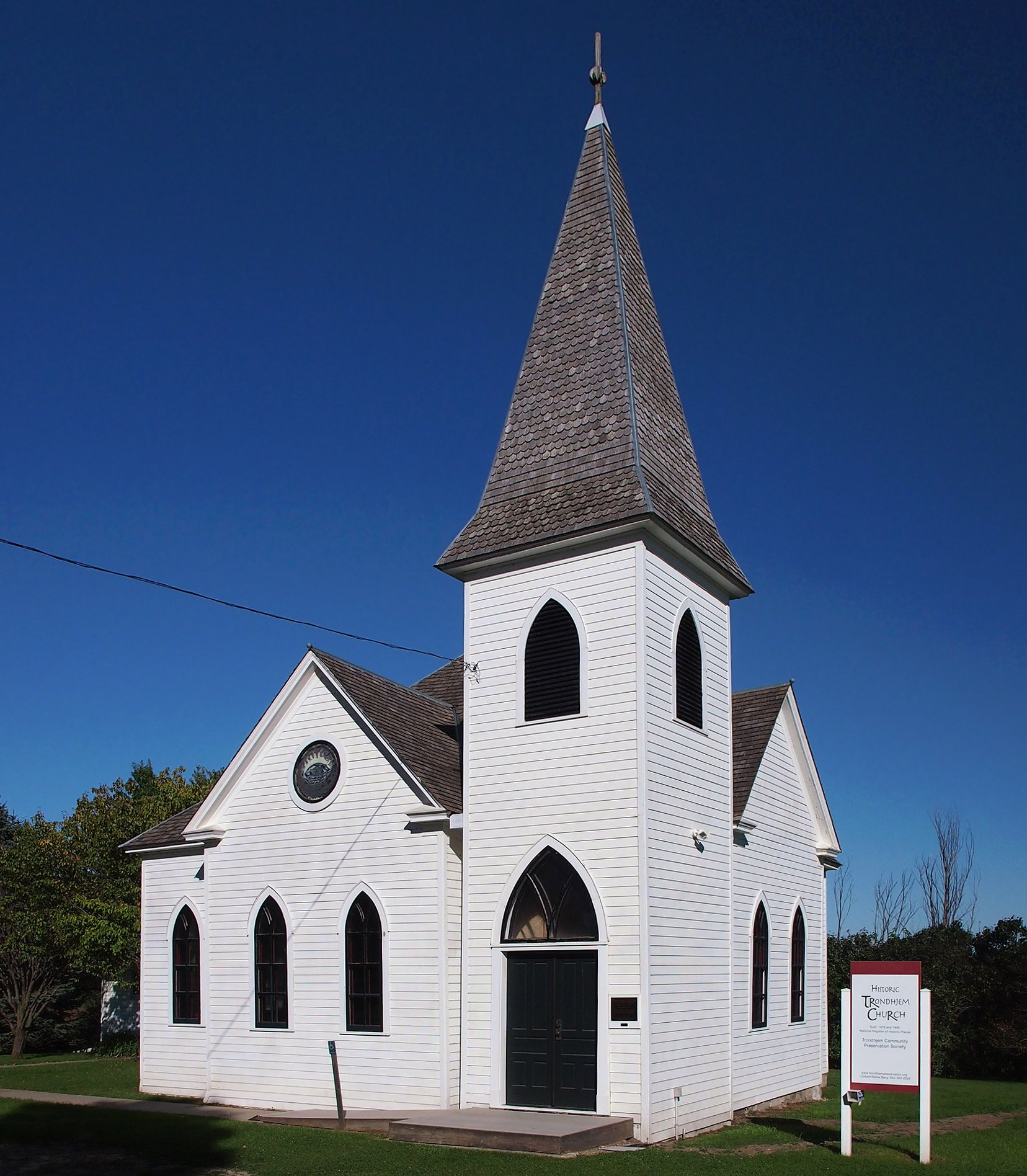
- Trondhjem Norwegian Lutheran Church from the west-southwest

- Location within Minnesota Location within the United States
- Location: 8501 Garfield Avenue S., Webster Township, Minnesota
- Nearest city: Lonsdale, Minnesota
- Coordinates: 44°27′51″N 93°24′8″W
- Built: 1899
- Architectural style: Greek Revival, Gothic Revival
- NRHP reference No.: 01000945
- Added to NRHP: September 7, 2001

Trondhjem Norwegian Lutheran Church is a historic church in Webster Township, Rice County, Minnesota. It was original built in 1878 and rebuilt in 1899. It is situated about 1 mi (1.6 km) south of Minnesota State Highway 19 at 8501 Garfield Avenue S, southeast of Lonsdale, Minnesota.

== History ==
According to the congregation minutes, on May 15, 1876, Norwegian immigrants established the Throndhjem's (sic) Church. The original church was built on the same site during 1878 using a cruciform architectural plan. Many elements in this building showing signs of prior use; most likely re-used from the prior structure.

== Present status ==
Annually the society hosts a winter concert, an ice cream social in July and the Syttende Mai celebration, all part of fundraising efforts.

In 2001 Trondhjem Norwegian Lutheran Church was listed on the National Register of Historic Places by the United States Department of Interior, United States Park Service, because of its historical significance. Also listed on the National Register of Historic Places and located across the road from the Old Trondhjem Church is the cemetery which was established before the church building.

== Related reading ==
- Ronning, N. N. (1947) Pioneer Sketches from Webster, Rice County, Minnesota (Minneapolis: Ludvig Broten)
- Rice County Historical Society (1987) Portraits and Memories of Rice County, Minnesota (Dallas: Taylor Publishing Co.)
