= Highview Christiania Lutheran Free Church =

Historic church in Minnesota, United States

- Christiania Lutheran Free Church
- U.S. National Register of Historic Places
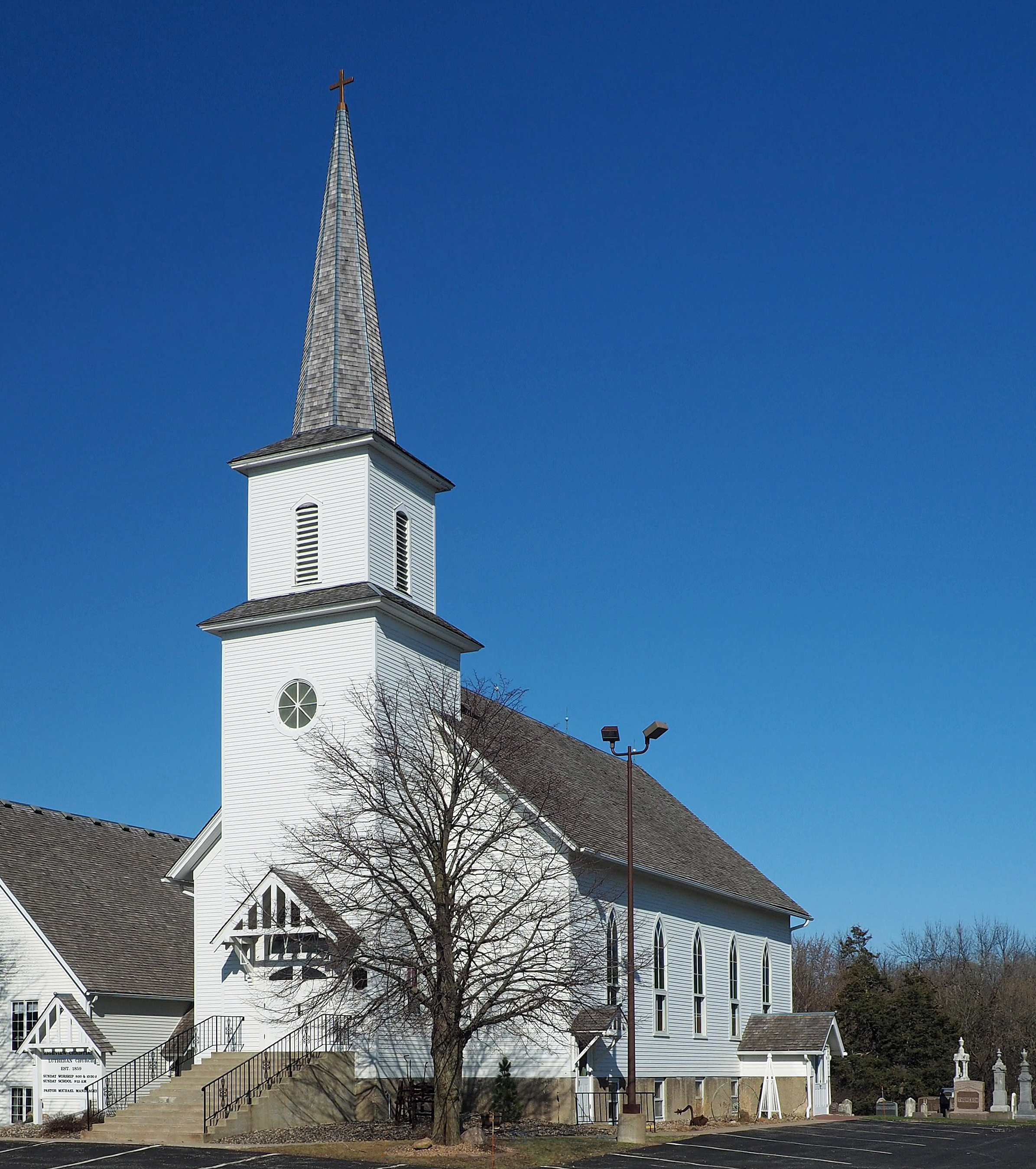
- Christiania Lutheran Free Church viewed from the southwest

- Location within Minnesota Location within the United States
- Location: 26690 Highview Avenue, Eureka Township, Minnesota
- Coordinates: 44°33′53″N 93°14′17″W
- Area: 6.3 acres (2.5 ha)
- Built: 1865 (cemetery), 1877–78 (church)
- Architect: Hans Berg Larsen
- Architectural style: Gothic Revival
- NRHP reference No.: 10000301
- Added to NRHP: May 28, 2010

Highview Christiania Lutheran Church is an American church in Eureka Township, Minnesota, at 26690 Highview Avenue, about nine miles (14 km) southwest of Farmington, Minnesota.

In the early 1850s, a group of Norwegian immigrants first arrived in Eureka Township. A Norwegian language Lutheran congregation was formally organized in 1860. Their church was first known as the Norwegian-Danish Evangelical Lutheran Church in Christiana Settlement.

The carpenter Gothic church was built under the direction of Hans Berg Larsen between 1877 and 1878, on the site of the old log church and dedicated in 1878. It is one of the oldest church buildings in continuous use in the state of Minnesota and has been called the Highview Christiania Lutheran Church since 1966. It was added to the National Register of Historic Places in 2010.
