= Equality Township, Red Lake County, Minnesota =

Equality Township, Minnesota
- Township
- Location of Equality Township, within Red Lake County, Minnesota
- Coordinates: 47°54′50″N 95°45′49″W
- Country: United States
- State: Minnesota
- County: Red Lake

Area
  - Total: 47.7 sq mi (123.6 km^{2})
  - Land: 47.7 sq mi (123.6 km^{2})
  - Water: 0.039 sq mi (0.1 km^{2})
- Elevation: 1,161 ft (354 m)

Population (2020)
  - Total: 144
  - Density: 3.02/sq mi (1.17/km^{2})
- Time zone: UTC-6 (Central (CST))
  - Summer (DST): UTC-5 (CDT)
- FIPS code: 27-19502
- GNIS feature ID: 0664102

Equality Township is a township in Red Lake County, Minnesota, United States. The population was 144 at the 2020 census. It is home to the Clearwater Evangelical Lutheran Church.

== Geography ==
According to the United States Census Bureau, the township has a total area of 47.7 square miles (124 km^{2}), of which 47.7 square miles (124 km^{2}) is land and 0.04 square miles (0.10 km^{2}) (0.04%) is water.

== Demographics ==
As of the census of 2000, there were 123 people, 50 households, and 34 families residing in the township. The population density was 2.6 inhabitants per square mile (1.0/km^{2}). There were 62 housing units at an average density of 1.3 per square mile (0.50/km^{2}). The racial makeup of the township was 100.00% White.

There were 50 households, out of which 34.0% had children under the age of 18 living with them, 60.0% were married couples living together, 4.0% had a female householder with no husband present, and 32.0% were non-families. 30.0% of all households were made up of individuals, and 14.0% had someone living alone who was 65 years of age or older. The average household size was 2.46 and the average family size was 3.09.

In the township the population was spread out, with 29.3% under the age of 18, 4.9% from 18 to 24, 28.5% from 25 to 44, 18.7% from 45 to 64, and 18.7% who were 65 years of age or older. The median age was 36 years. For every 100 females, there were 146.0 males. For every 100 females age 18 and over, there were 141.7 males.

The median income for a household in the township was $31,250, and the median income for a family was $29,375. Males had a median income of $31,750 versus $18,125 for females. The per capita income for the township was $19,046. There were 14.3% of families and 9.8% of the population living below the poverty line, including no under eighteens and 14.3% of those over 64.
