= Zion Lutheran Church (Shelly, Minnesota) =

Historic church in Minnesota, United States

- U.S. National Register of Historic Places
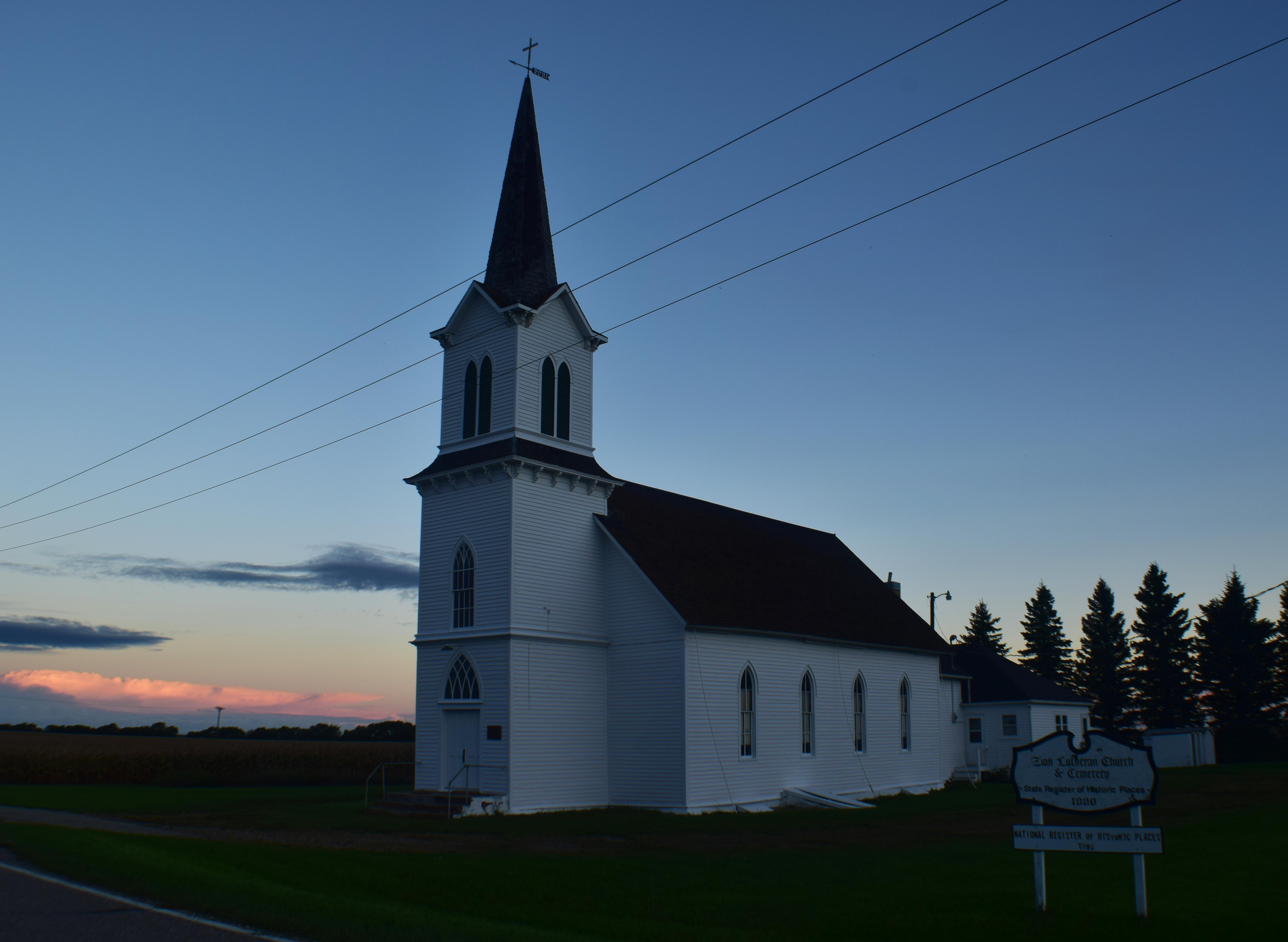
- Zion Lutheran Church from the southeast

- Location within Minnesota Location within the United States
- Nearest city: Shelly, Minnesota
- Coordinates: 47°27′20″N 96°47′28″W
- Built: 1883
- Architect: Olson, Tonder
- Architectural style: Gothic
- NRHP reference No.: 99001269
- Added to NRHP: October 21, 1999

Zion Lutheran Church is located in rural Norman County, Minnesota, United States. The church is situated 3 miles (4.8 km) east of the town of Shelly on County Road 3. The church was founded in 1880 to serve a Norwegian immigrant congregation. The Victorian Gothic church was constructed during 1883. The church and adjacent cemetery were listed on the National Register of Historic Places in 1999.
