= Clearwater Evangelical Lutheran Church =

Historic church in Minnesota, United States

- U.S. National Register of Historic Places
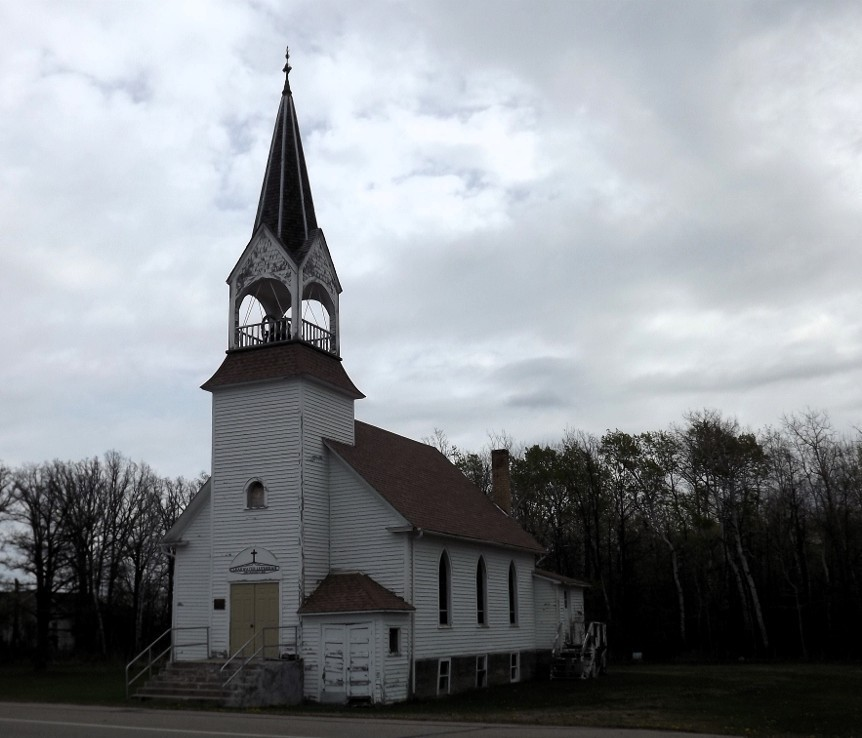
- The church viewed from the southwest
- Nearest city: Oklee, Minnesota
- Coordinates: 47°55′41″N 95°46′27″W
- Area: 2.6 acres (1.1 ha)
- Built: 1912
- Built by: Aslak and Oscar Nesland
- Architectural style: Gothic Revival
- NRHP reference No.: 99001386
- Added to NRHP: November 18, 1999

Clearwater Evangelical Lutheran Church is a rural former place of worship near the Clearwater River in Equality Township, Red Lake County, Minnesota. It served a congregation of Norwegian Americans which organized in 1898 under the name Clearwater Norwegian Evangelical Lutheran Church of America. Before building the church, they met in homes and log schoolhouses.

The cornerstone of the church was dedicated in 1911 and the building was completed 1912 but not wired for electricity until 1949. Norwegian was taught in the church school until 1940 and into the 1950s some worship services were entirely in Norwegian. The church closed in 1988 due to declining membership. Together with the adjacent cemetery, it was listed on the National Register of Historic Places in 1999.
