= Lebanon Lutheran Church =

Historic church in South Dakota, United States

- U.S. National Register of Historic Places
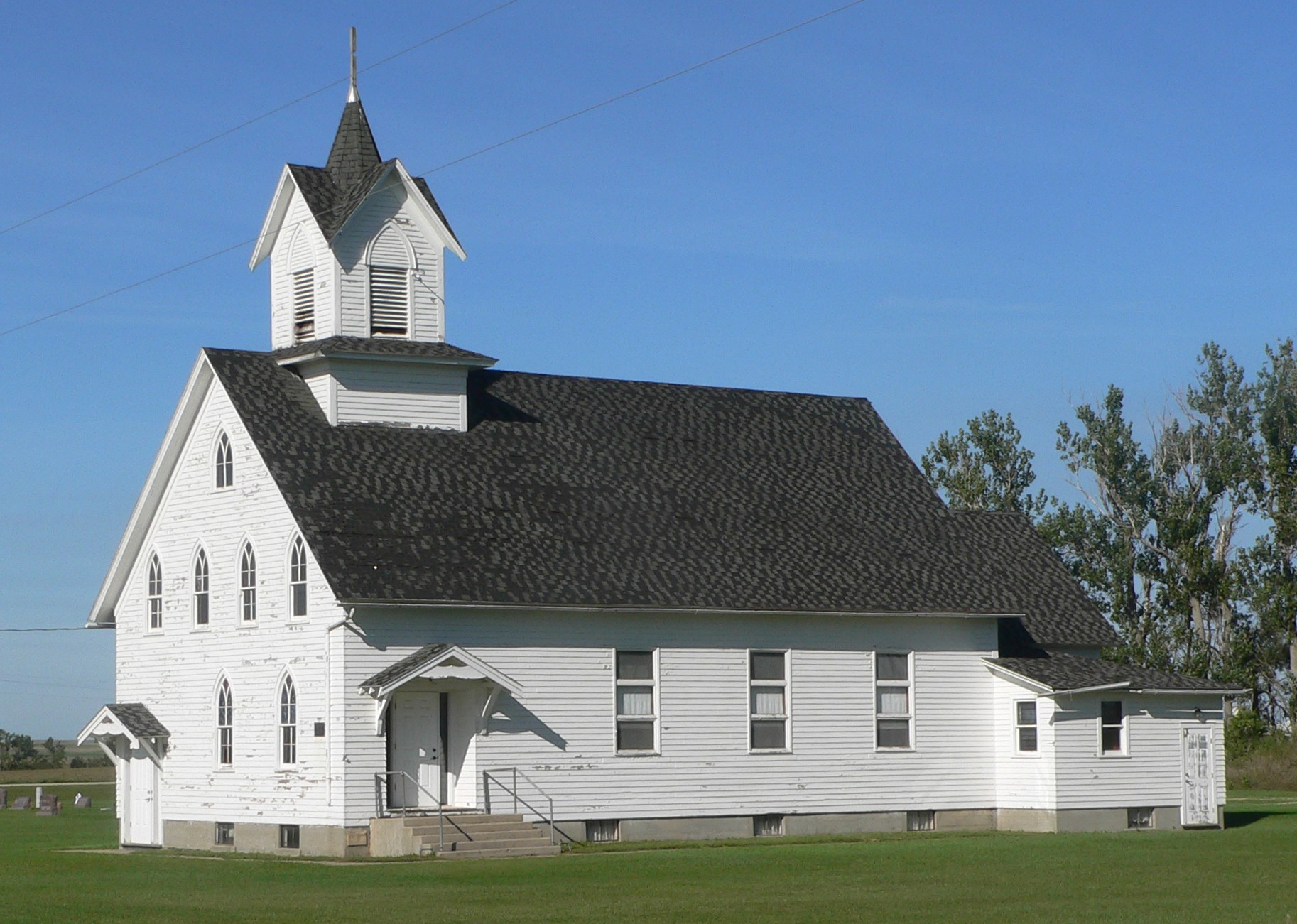

- Location within South Dakota Location within the United States
- Nearest city: Summit, South Dakota
- Coordinates: 45.267249°N 97.164403°W
- Built: 1908
- Architectural style: Late Gothic Revival
- NRHP reference No.: 77001244
- Added to NRHP: September 15, 1977

The Lebanon Lutheran Church in South Dakota was established by Norwegian immigrants to the Sisseton-Wahpeton (Lake Traverse) Sioux Indian Reservation. It was the first Norwegian Lutheran church in that area predating congregations in nearby Ortley and Summit. It was added to the National Register of Historic Places in 1977.

During the mid-1960s, Lebanon Church experienced a decline in its rural population. Consequently, it merged with Zion Lutheran Church (Ortley) and Summit Lutheran Church, forming a new entity known as Hope Lutheran Church in Summit, SD.

Regular Sunday services ceased at that point, although the property continues to be maintained and is utilized periodically for special events relating primarily to the history of the church or descendants of the parishioners.
