= Cranfills Gap, Texas =

City in Hamilton County, Texas, United States

- City
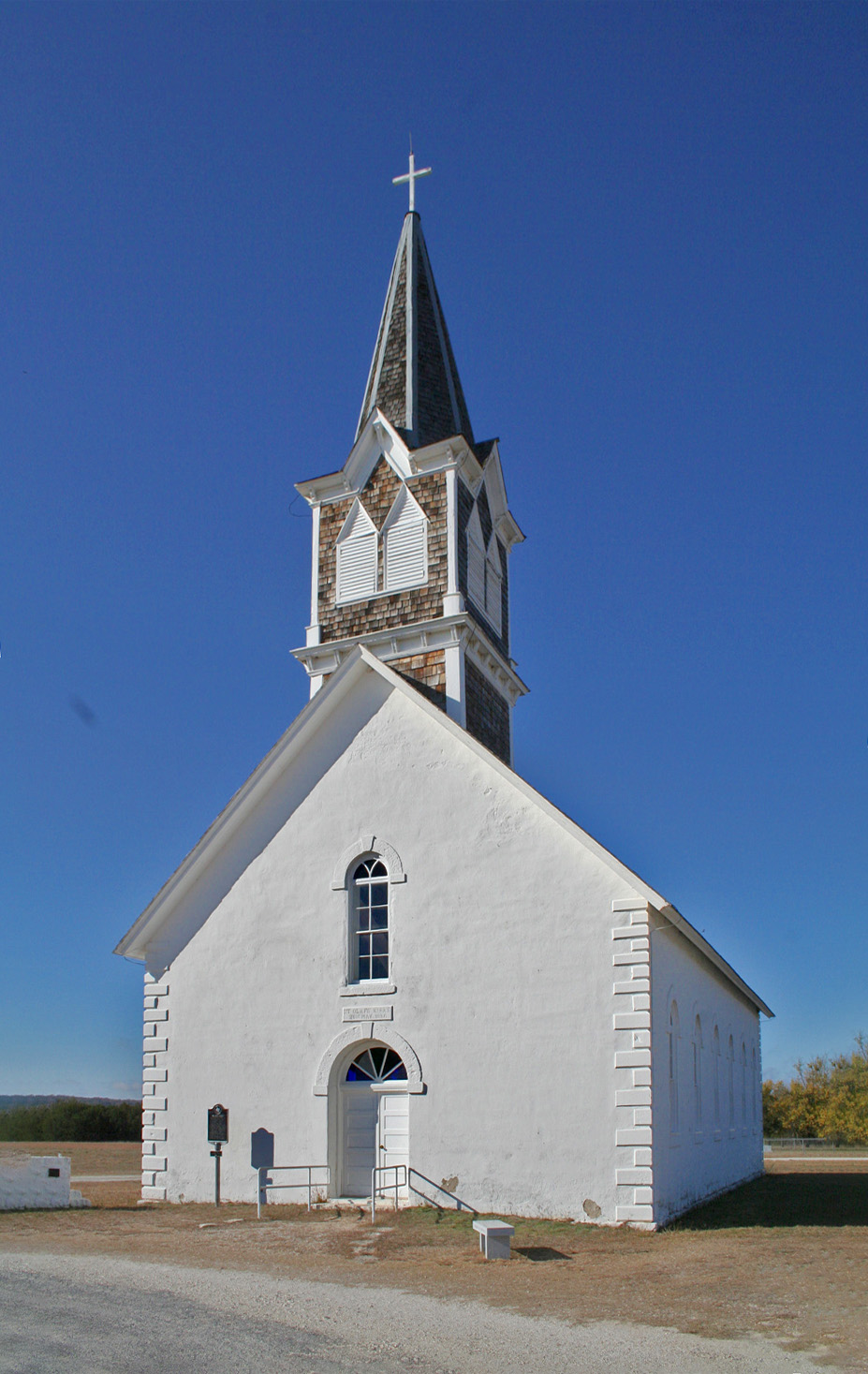
- St. Olaf Kirke located just outside Cranfills Gap in the unincorporated rural community known as Norse, Texas

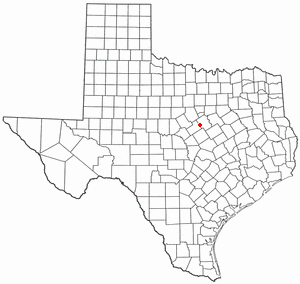
- Location of Cranfills Gap, Texas

- Coordinates: 31°46′31″N 97°49′49″W
- Country: United States
- State: Texas
- County: Bosque

Area
  - Total: 0.73 sq mi (1.88 km^{2})
  - Land: 0.73 sq mi (1.88 km^{2})
  - Water: 0 sq mi (0.00 km^{2})
- Elevation: 1,011 ft (308 m)

Population (2020)
  - Total: 277
  - Density: 382/sq mi (147/km^{2})
- Time zone: UTC-6 (Central (CST))
  - Summer (DST): UTC-5 (CDT)
- ZIP code: 76637
- Area code: 254
- FIPS code: 48-17540
- GNIS feature ID: 2410259
- Website: www.cranfillsgaptexas.com

Cranfills Gap is a city located in Bosque County in central Texas, United States. It was founded by Norwegian Emigrants and to this day most residents can trace their lineage to those Norwegian Founders. The Bosque county area surrounding Cranfills Gap is listed on the National Register of Historic places as the Norse Historic District. The population was 277 at the 2020 census.

== History ==
The area in which Cranfills Gap is located was originally settled by and named for George Eaton Cranfill in 1851.

Norwegian settlers in and around the community, who were mostly Lutheran, built St. Olaf Kirke (kirke is Norwegian for "church") in a rural area just outside Cranfills Gap. St. Olaf Kirke, commonly referred to as The Rock Church, is a small Lutheran church located in the unincorporated rural community of Norse, Texas. Among the pioneers in Norse was Cleng Peerson. The founder of Norse was Ole Canuteson (Ole Knudsen) from the Stavanger region of Norway. In 1917, as the congregation of that church began to grow, a new church was built for the congregation inside the town.

The town slowly grew to its peak population of 600 in 1940. During World War II, Cranfills Gap was the first town to sell more than its quota of war bonds for the Fourth War Loan Drive. While as many as 25 businesses operated within "the gap", as locals commonly refer to it, the population and the business activity slowly dwindled to roughly nine businesses in 1980 and a population of 269 in 1990.

On December 3, 2008, KXXV-TV in nearby Waco reported on its website that Cranfills Gap had been selected for participation in an advertising campaign for the Las Vegas Convention and Visitors Authority. The selection process compared hundreds of rural communities from across the USA seeking "the most unique all-American town in all of the 50 states." Cranfills Gap was first contacted by the LVCVA in October 2008 when the town was placed on the list of ten candidate communities. A film crew and LVCVA representative visited the town for a few days and interviewed residents about the town, their impressions of and experience with Las Vegas, and their opinions about the ongoing selection process. In November 2008, Cranfills Gap Chamber of Commerce members were notified that the LVCVA had shortened the list to two finalists including their town. Another LVCVA delegation was dispatched to Cranfills Gap for a closer look. The visitors stayed for about a week and conducted a fresh set of interviews and observed the community at work and play. Although the LVCVA had initially intended to send 150 residents from the winning locality to Sin City, the Cranfills Gap Chamber of Commerce and elected officials struck a feasible compromise with their visitors: if selected, Cranfills Gap would make every effort to provide one hundred adult men and women for the LVCVA's project. During the first week of December 2008, Cranfills Gap and local media were notified by LVCVA that the town had won the nationwide search and 100 of its residents would be sent on a free trip to Las Vegas during the weekend of December 5–7, 2008. Cranfills Gap City Council member Ron Hubbard told the press that he sincerely hoped Cranfills Gap would reap benefits from the ad campaign beyond just plane tickets and memories. "With that national recognition, maybe people will come visit, see what we're all about," said Hubbard.

== Geography ==
Cranfills Gap is located in western Bosque County. Its western border is the Hamilton County line. Texas State Highway 22 passes through the town, leading northeast 14 miles (23 km) to Meridian, the Bosque county seat, and west 18 miles (29 km) to Hamilton.

1,164-foot (355 m) Cranfills Mountain is in the western part of the town, rising 180 feet (55 m) above the town center.

According to the United States Census Bureau, the town has a total area of 0.7 square miles (1.8 km^{2}), all land.

== Climate ==
The climate in this area is characterized by hot, humid summers and generally mild to cool winters. According to the Köppen Climate Classification system, Cranfills Gap has a humid subtropical climate, abbreviated "Cfa" on climate maps.

== Demographics ==
Historical population
Census	Pop.	Note	%±
1980	341		—
1990	269		−21.1%
2000	335		24.5%
2010	281		−16.1%
2020	277		−1.4%
U.S. Decennial Census; 2020 Census

=== 2020 census ===
As of the 2020 census, Cranfills Gap had a population of 277 and a median age of 39.4 years. 26.7% of residents were under the age of 18 and 21.3% of residents were 65 years of age or older. For every 100 females there were 103.7 males, and for every 100 females age 18 and over there were 97.1 males age 18 and over.

0.0% of residents lived in urban areas, while 100.0% lived in rural areas.

There were 107 households in Cranfills Gap, of which 34.6% had children under the age of 18 living in them. Of all households, 40.2% were married-couple households, 21.5% were households with a male householder and no spouse or partner present, and 33.6% were households with a female householder and no spouse or partner present. About 26.1% of all households were made up of individuals and 17.7% had someone living alone who was 65 years of age or older.

There were 133 housing units, of which 19.5% were vacant. The homeowner vacancy rate was 2.6% and the rental vacancy rate was 0.0%.

Racial composition as of the 2020 census
Race	Number	Percent
White	209	75.5%
Black or African American	5	1.8%
American Indian and Alaska Native	4	1.4%
Asian	0	0.0%
Native Hawaiian and Other Pacific Islander	0	0.0%
Some other race	20	7.2%
Two or more races	39	14.1%
Hispanic or Latino (of any race)	52	18.8%

=== 2000 census ===
As of the 2000 census, there were 335 people, 132 households, and 90 families residing in the town. The population density was 459.9 inhabitants per square mile (177.6/km^{2}). There were 156 housing units at an average density of 214.2 per square mile (82.7/km^{2}). The racial makeup of the town was 91.34% White, 0.30% African American, 0.90% Native American, 4.78% from other races, and 2.69% from two or more races. Hispanic or Latino of any race were 8.66% of the population.

There were 132 households, out of which 37.9% had children under the age of 18 living with them, 53.8% were married couples living together, 9.8% had a female householder with no husband present, and 31.1% were non-families. 28.8% of all households were made up of individuals, and 16.7% had someone living alone who was 65 years of age or older. The average household size was 2.54 and the average family size was 3.13.

In the town, the population was spread out, with 29.3% under the age of 18, 6.6% from 18 to 24, 23.0% from 25 to 44, 24.8% from 45 to 64, and 16.4% who were 65 years of age or older. The median age was 40 years. For every 100 females, there were 106.8 males. For every 100 females age 18 and over, there were 100.8 males.

The median income for a household in the town was $26,484, and the median income for a family was $31,389. Males had a median income of $26,250 versus $15,250 for females. The per capita income for the town was $15,405. About 14.3% of families and 14.0% of the population were below the poverty line, including 19.0% of those under age 18 and 7.3% of those age 65 or over.

== Education ==
Cranfills Gap is served by the Cranfills Gap Independent School District.

== See also ==
- List of municipalities in Texas
