= Wilsey =

Wilsey may refer to:

== People ==
- Dede Wilsey (born 1944), American socialite and philanthropist
- James Calvin Wilsey (contemporary, 1957–2018), American punk-rock guitarist
- Jay Wilsey (1896–1961), American film actor
- John Wilsey (born 1939), British army officer; Commander-in-Chief, Land Command 1993–96
- Sean Wilsey (born 1970), American author and editor
- Frank Wilsey, a member of the Sea Hags
- Shannon Michelle Wilsey, the actress Savannah

== Places ==
- Wilsey, Kansas, United States
- RHS Garden, Wisley
- Wisley, Surrey
