= Traina (surname) =

Traina is a surname. Notable people with the surname include:

- Angelo Traina (1889-1971), American Biblical scholar
- Francesco Traina (1578–1651), Italian Roman Catholic bishop
- Geraldine Traina (1936–2011), American feminist
- Giusto Traina (born 1959), Italian ancient historian and Byzantinist
- Jackie Traina (born 1991), American softball player
- John Traina, American soccer player
- Nick Traina (1978–1997), American singer
- Todd Traina, American film producer
- Trevor Traina (born 1968), American entrepreneur and diplomat
