= Wiley T. Buchanan Jr. =

American diplomat (1913–1986)

9th Chief of Protocol of the United States
- In office February 4, 1957 – January 23, 1961
- President: Dwight D. Eisenhower
- Preceded by: John F. Simmons
- Succeeded by: Angier Biddle Duke

United States Ambassador to Austria
- In office April 2, 1975 – March 31, 1977
- President: Gerald Ford
- Preceded by: John P. Humes
- Succeeded by: Milton A. Wolf

United States Ambassador to Luxembourg
- In office December 1, 1953 – December 20, 1956
- President: Dwight D. Eisenhower
- Preceded by: Perle Mesta
- Succeeded by: Vinton Chapin

Personal details
- Born: Wiley Thomas Buchanan, Jr. January 4, 1913 Van Zandt County, Texas, U.S.
- Died: February 16, 1986 (aged 73) Washington, D.C., U.S.
- Resting place: Oak Hill Cemetery; Washington, D.C., U.S.
- Party: Republican
- Spouse: Ruth Elizabeth Hale (m. 1940)
- Children: 3, including Dede Wilsey
- Parent(s): Wiley Thomas Buchanan; Lilla Youngblood Buchanan
- Education: Southern Methodist University; George Washington University

Wiley Thomas Buchanan, Jr. (January 4, 1913 – February 16, 1986) was an American diplomat and author who served as the Chief of Protocol of the United States and the U.S. Ambassador to Luxembourg and Austria.

== Early life ==
Buchanan was born on January 4, 1913, in Grand Saline in Van Zandt County, Texas. He was the son of Wiley Thomas Buchanan (1880–1953) and Lilla (née Youngblood) Buchanan (1885–1975). Along with his siblings, which included Ava Nell Buchanan Inglish, Kathleen Millie Buchanan Tennison, and Avon Arnold Buchanan, he was a "Texas cotton, lumber and oil heir."

His paternal grandparents were James Richard Buchanan, a relative of President James Buchanan, and Mary Cordelia (née Bohanan) Buchanan, who married Texas farmer William Pittman Sides after his grandfather's death in 1883.

Buchanan attended the Terrill School in Dallas, then Southern Methodist University, also in Texas, and George Washington University in Washington, D.C.

== Career ==
Mr. Buchanan began his government career with a World War II agency called the War Production Board. He later became an official with the National Production Authority in the early 1950s.

=== Diplomatic career ===
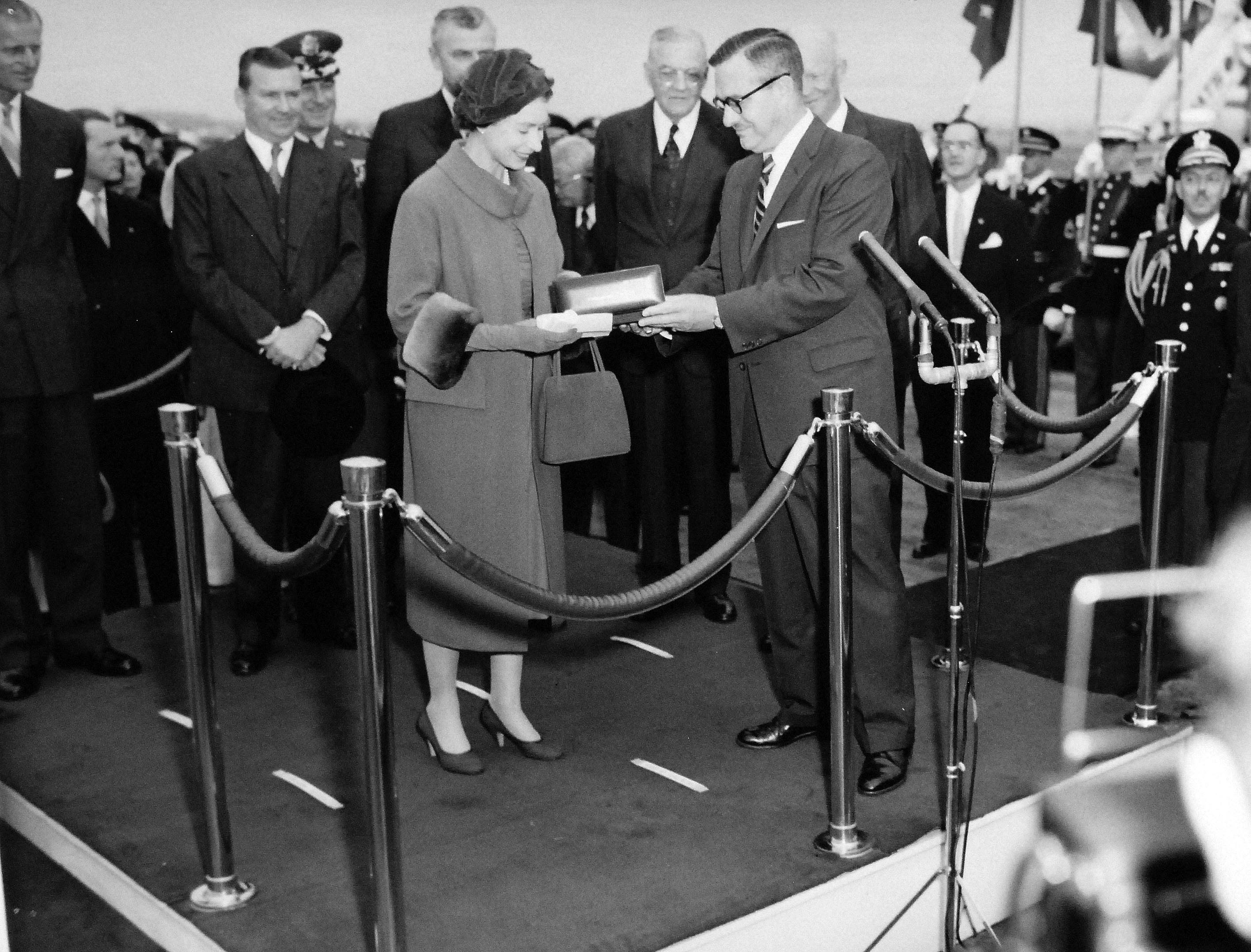
Her Majesty Queen Elizabeth II is presented the Key to the City of Washington by District Commissioner Robert Enoch McLaughlin in 1957. Buchanan is right of Prince Philip, Duke of Edinburgh.

On September 12, 1953, he was appointed Envoy Extraordinary and Minister Plenipotentiary to Luxembourg by U.S. President Dwight D. Eisenhower to replace fellow Texan and outsize personality and steel heiress Perle Mesta. He presented his credentials on December 1, 1953, and, two years later, when the two countries agreed to raise their respective missions to embassy level, he was promoted, appointed on September 9, 1956, and confirmed (during a recess of the U.S. Senate), as the U.S. Ambassador to Luxembourg. Buchanan left his post in Luxembourg on December 20, 1956.

Shortly after returning from Luxembourg, Eisenhower appointed Buchanan became Chief of Protocol, a role designed to assist the international diplomats stationed in the United States. He was protocol chief until January 1961 when John F. Kennedy was inaugurated as President and he was succeeded by Angier Biddle Duke, the former Ambassador to El Salvador and a close friend of Kennedy. In 1959, The Washington Post described Buchanan as follows:

"What kind of a man is Wiley Buchanan? ... He is of medium height--five feet, eight and a half inches of shrewd determination... Buchanan has the same firm lines around his jaw and the same love of hospitality which characterized his ancestor, the fifteenth President of the United States, James Buchanan... His formidable fortune, flowing originally from Texas lumber, cotton, and oil, keeps multiplying through his Washington real estate foresight."

After leaving the government, he wrote an amusing memoir in which he candidly discussed his work as head of protocol. The book, Red Carpet at the White House: Four Years as Chief of Protocol in the Eisenhower Administration, was published in 1964. Buchanan was a close friend of Richard Nixon, and contributed to his campaign for president.

On March 25, 1975, then President Gerald Ford appointed Buchanan as the U.S. Ambassador to Austria. He presented his credentials on April 2, 1975, and served throughout the rest of the Ford administration, leaving his post on March 13, 1977. Upon Jimmy Carter's election to the presidency, Buchanan was succeeded by Milton A. Wolf, a former investment banker and real estate developer from Cleveland, Ohio.

In Washington, he was a member of the Federal City Council, L'Enfant Plaza Corporation, and the National Symphony, of which he sat on the board for the last two. He was a trustee of his alma mater, George Washington University, and the Johns Hopkins University's School of Advanced International Studies.

== Personal life ==
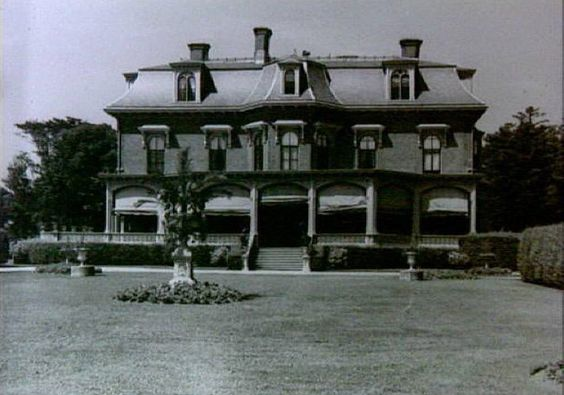
Beulieu House, the Buchanan residence in Newport, Rhode Island, when it was owned by Grace Vanderbilt.

On April 12, 1940, Buchanan was married to heiress Ruth Elizabeth Hale (1918–2019), the daughter of Helen (née Dow) Hale and William Jay Hale. Ruth was the niece of architect Alden B. Dow, and the granddaughter of Grace and Herbert Henry Dow, the founder of Dow Chemical. Together, they were the parents of:

- Bonnie Ruth Buchanan (b. c. 1942), who married Charles Tompkins Matheson, an architect, in 1961.
- Diane Dow Buchanan (b. 1944), who married shipping magnate and art collector John Traina in 1965, The Trainas divorced and she later married Al Wilsey, who had recently divorced Patricia Montandon.
- Wiley Thomas Buchanan III (b. c. 1946)

In Washington D.C., they lived at Underoak on Nebraska Avenue Northwest. In 1961, Buchanan and his wife purchased Beulieu House in Newport, Rhode Island, the former home of John Jacob Astor III, Cornelius Vanderbilt III, and his wife Grace Vanderbilt, where they spent their summers. He was a member of the Metropolitan Club and Chevy Chase Club.

Buchanan died from Alzheimer's disease at the Potomac Valley Nursing Home on February 16, 1986, in Washington. He was buried at Oak Hill Cemetery in Washington, D.C. His widow Ruth died at her home in Washington, at age 101, on November 18, 2019.

=== Descendants ===
Through his daughter Bonnie, he was the grandfather of sculptor Lilla Youngblood Matheson (namesake of Buchanan's mother), who married Christopher Finley Ohrstrom, a real-estate investor and the son of Mary, Viscountess Rothermere (widow of Esmond Harmsworth, 2nd Viscount Rothermere) and Ricard Riggs Ohrstrom, in 1987. In 1993, they lived in Strasbourg, France.

Through his daughter Diana, he was the grandfather of Todd, a film producer, and Trevor Traina, who served as Ambassador to Austria from 2018 to 2021.

Diplomatic posts
Preceded by John P. Humes	United States Ambassador to Austria; 1975–1977	Succeeded by Milton A. Wolf
Preceded by John F. Simmons	Chief of Protocol of the United States; 1957–1961	Succeeded by Angier Biddle Duke
Preceded by Perle Mesta	United States Ambassador to Luxembourg; 1953–1956	Succeeded by Vinton Chapin
