= Traina =

Traina may refer to:

- Troina, Sicilian name of a former bishopric and present Latin Catholic titular see
- Traina (moth), a moth genus in the family Geometridae
- Traina Center for the Arts, formerly the Downing Street School, in the US state of Massachusetts
- Traina (surname), including a list of people with the name
