= Vinton Chapin =

American diplomat (1900–1982)

United States Ambassador to Luxembourg
- In office October 29, 1957 – July 31, 1960
- President: Dwight D. Eisenhower
- Preceded by: Wiley T. Buchanan Jr.
- Succeeded by: A. Burks Summers

Personal details
- Born: April 17, 1900 Paris, France
- Died: September 15, 1982 (aged 82) Woburn, Massachusetts, U.S.
- Party: Republican
- Spouses: Elizabeth Brosius Higgins Olmsted (m. 1928, divorced) Lilian Aldrich Winchester (m. 1938)
- Education: St. Mark's School
- Alma mater: Harvard University

Vinton Chapin (April 17, 1900 – September 15, 1982) was an American diplomat who served as the United States Ambassador to Luxembourg.

== Early life ==
Chapin was born on April 17, 1900, to American parents in Paris, France. He was a son of Dr. Amory Chapin (1855–1917) and Annie (née Dickinson) Chapin (1876–1925).

His paternal grandparents were John Farnum Chapin and Frances Jones (née Vinton) Chapin (niece of Elisha Dyer, the 25th Governor of Rhode Island, and first cousin of Elisha Dyer Jr., also a Governor of Rhode Island). His paternal aunt, Esther Dyer Chapin, was the second wife of Brigadier General William A. Hammond, Surgeon General of the United States Army.

He was educated at St. Mark's School in Southborough, Massachusetts, before attending Harvard University, where he graduated with the class of 1923 and was a member of the Hasty Pudding Institute of 1770 and the Harvard Club of Boston. At Harvard, he was president of the freshman class and was a star tailback player on the Harvard Crimson football team.

== Career ==
During World War I, Chapin served in the U.S. Marine Corps.

=== Diplomatic career ===
After the War, he became a Foreign Service officer with the U.S. Department of State. He served as the U.S. Vice Consul in Prague in 1929, and the U.S. Consul in Port-au-Prince in 1943. In 1947, he was located at The Hague in The Netherlands. In the late 1950s, he was counselor of the United States Embassy in Havana.

On July 3, 1957, President Dwight D. Eisenhower appointed Chapin the United States Ambassador to Luxembourg to succeed Wiley T. Buchanan Jr. Chapin presented his credentials on October 29, 1957. His mission was terminated when he left the post on July 31, 1960. He was succeeded in the role by A. Burks Summers. On June 23, 1960, President Eisenhower appointed him to succeed Joseph S. Farland as the U.S. Ambassador to the Dominican Republic. Chapin took the oath of office, but did not proceed to post as the U.S. severed diplomatic relations with the Dominican Republic on August 26, 1960. In the interim, the duties of which were carried out by the Chargé d'Affaires ad interim Henry Mark Valpey Dearborn.

In 1968, Chapin was a member of the Ambassadors for Nixon Committee, an organization formed of seventeen former ambassadors to support the, then, former Vice President Richard M. Nixon's run for president.

== Personal life ==
On November 1, 1928, Chapin was married to Elizabeth Brosius (née Higgins) Olmsted (1900–1970) at Prouts Neck, Maine. Elizabeth, the former wife of Frederick Nelson Olmsted of Boston, was daughter of Aldus Chapin Higgins and the older sister of Milton Prince Higgins (1903–1997). Together, they were the parents of:

- Richard Chapin (1923–2013), who served as president of Emerson College in Boston from 1967 to 1975. He was married to Maryan Gainor Fox, a granddaughter of Judge Edward Fox, in 1956.
- Aldus Higgins Chapin (1930–2009), who married Nancy Newell Daniels, daughter of Rexford Daniels in 1956. He later married Dorothy "Dolly" Langdon. He served as executive director of the Corcoran Gallery of Art and president of the board of The Washington Ballet.

They divorced and Elizabeth remarried to Ernest Angell, who later served as the president of the American Civil Liberties Union, in February 1939. Her daughter from her second marriage, Abigail Brosius Angell, was married to Cass Canfield Jr., son of Cass Canfield, in 1973. Canfield's younger brother Michael Canfield was the first husband of Lee Radziwill.

In January 1938, he was married to Lilian (née Aldrich) Winchester. Lillian, who was divorced from John Winchester of Boston with whom she had two sons (Charles and Gordon Winchester), was a daughter of Charles F. Aldrich of Boston and Fairwood Farms in Dublin, New Hampshire. In March 1939, his wife was presented to King George VI and Queen Elizabeth at Buckingham Palace by Ambassador Joseph P. Kennedy, father of future U.S. President John F. Kennedy.

Chapin died on September 15, 1982, at the New England Rehabilitation Hospital in Woburn, Massachusetts, after a long illness. He was buried at Swan Point Cemetery in Providence, Rhode Island.

Diplomatic posts
Preceded by Wiley T. Buchanan Jr.	United States Ambassador to Luxembourg; 1957–1960	Succeeded by A. Burks Summers
