= I Hate Kids =

- Directed by: John Asher
- Written by: Frank Dietz; Todd Traina
- Produced by: Todd Traina; Rachel McHale
- Starring: Tom Everett Scott; Titus Burgess; Julian Feder; Rachel Boston; Rhea Seehorn; Julie Ann Emery
- Cinematography: Blake Evans
- Edited by: John Kovac
- Music by: Joseph Bauer; Mike Raznick
- Production companies: Swing Lake Entertainment; Red Rover Film; Route One Entertainment
- Distributed by: Freestyle Digital Media
- Release date: January 18, 2019
- Running time: 89 minutes
- Country: United States
- Language: English

I Hate Kids is a 2019 American adventure comedy film written by Frank Dietz and Todd Traina, directed by John Asher and starring Tom Everett Scott and Tituss Burgess.

== Cast ==
- Tom Everett Scott as Nick Pearson
- Tituss Burgess as The Amazing Fabular
- Julian Feder as Mason
- Rachel Boston as Sydney Bartlett
- Rhea Seehorn as Kelly
- Julie Ann Emery as Joanna
- Beth Riesgraf as Schyler Cross
- Arden Myrin as Janice Bodicker
- Bryan Batt as Reverend McGooley
- Andrew Bowen as Richard
- Joyce Bulifant as Betty Bartlett
- Ray Abruzzo as Walter
- Rico E. Anderson as Officer Evans
- Mary Hollis Inboden as Nurse
- John Landis as Psychic
- Rachel McHale as Psychic
- Jeris Lee Poindexter as Attendant
- Marisa Tomei as Christina Hurley
- Todd Traina as Psychic

== Release ==
The film was released on January 18, 2019.

== Reception ==
The film has a 25% rating on Rotten Tomatoes based on eight reviews.
