= Dede Wilsey =

American socialite and philanthropist

- Born: Diane Dow Buchanan; 1944 (age 81–82); Washington, D.C., US
- Other names: Diane Buchanan Traina; Diane Buchanan Wilsey
- Education: Connecticut College
- Spouses: John Traina (m. 1965; div. 1980) Alfred Wilsey (m. 1981; died 2002)
- Children: Trevor Traina; Todd Traina
- Parent(s): Wiley T. Buchanan Jr. Ruth Elizabeth Hale
- Relatives: Herbert Henry Dow (great-grandfather)

Diane Buchanan "Dede" Wilsey (born 1944) is an American socialite, Republican Party donor, and philanthropist, who lives in San Francisco. She is the widow and heir of the San Francisco dairy and real estate businessman Alfred Spalding Wilsey, and the Chair Emerita of the Fine Arts Museums of San Francisco.

== Early life and background ==
Wilsey was born Diane Dow Buchanan in 1944. Her father, Wiley T. Buchanan Jr., was the U.S. ambassador to Luxembourg and Austria and the White House Chief of Protocol during the presidency of Dwight Eisenhower. Her maternal great-grandfather, Herbert Henry Dow, was the founder of Dow Chemical.

Buchanan enjoyed a privileged childhood in which she summered at her family's estate, Beaulieu House in Newport, Rhode Island, or in the south of France, a member of a social circle that included royalty and heads of government. When she made her debut, while a student at Connecticut College, Town & Country Magazine featured her on its cover (June 1962).

== Personal life ==
In 1965, at 21 years old, in a match opposed by her father, Buchanan married John Traina, a shipping and cruise magnate. They had two sons, Trevor and Todd Traina. A year after parting from Traina in 1980, she married the dairy product mogul and real estate developer Al Wilsey. The couple soon became popular San Francisco and Napa Valley, where they maintained a country house. Al Wilsey died in 2002 at the age of 82.

Wilsey is featured prominently in her stepson Sean Wilsey's memoir Oh the Glory of it All, in which the author described her as his "evil stepmother", and contended that she married Al Wilsey because of his $300 million fortune.

== Philanthropy ==
Wilsey has been a prominent supporter of several institutions in San Francisco, including its Grace Cathedral and the San Francisco Opera. But her most notable philanthropic affiliation has been with the city's Fine Art Museums, and Golden Gate Park's de Young in particular. Seven years after being elected president of the Museums' board of trustees in 1998, Wilsey led a campaign which raised $208 million to repair the damage to the de Young that had been inflicted by the 1989 Loma Prieta earthquake, contributing $10 million of her own money to the cause. The sum elicited by her appeal was one of the largest ever given to an American museum.

After the Museums' long-serving director, John Buchanan, died in 2011, Wilsey assumed his executive responsibilities herself, but her management of the Museums' affairs was not universally applauded. In March 2013, she was accused of creating turmoil. It was alleged that she had exploited her wealth and her power to fire many of the de Young's most experienced curators, to force it to mount an exhibition of photographs owned by one of her sons and to appropriate some of its staff to tend to her personal collection. Her discharge of her duties attracted further controversy when she authorized a payment to a former employee of the Museums which their chief financial officer thought to be improper. The whistle-blower was dismissed, but she was subsequently awarded a $2 million settlement to compensate her for her firing and the payment which had triggered the scandal was refunded. In July 2016, it was reported that Wilsey was relinquishing her position as the Museums' lifetime president. A former board member of the San Francisco Fine Arts Museum said she runs the museum "like a personal fiefdom". She resigned as president of the board of the Fine Arts Museums of San Francisco in June 2019. In 2022, the Museums' official website described her as their Chair Emerita.

She sometimes makes donations in her dogs' names. The Sparkle Wilsey Grooming Center of the Humane Society Silicon Valley was named after one of her deceased dogs.

== JFK Promenade controversy ==
San Francisco's JFK Promenade was introduced in 1967, when the city's authorities decided to bar cars from a portion of JFK Drive in Golden Gate Park on Sundays and some other days in order to make it available for recreation. When the COVID-19 pandemic led to a greater need for recreational spaces, the city decided to ban traffic from the Promenade altogether. Wilsey and the Fine Arts Museums were opposed to the city's measure because it made access to the de Young less convenient, but a citywide consultation that revealed a supermajority in favor of the Promenade's pedestrianization led to a Board of Supervisors decision to keep the Promenade free from traffic permanently. In 2022, Wilsey and the Museums promoted a ballot that invited San Franciscans to reopen the Promenade to cars, but 61% of voters chose to preserve the status quo.

Wilsey also serves on the board of the Museum Concourse Community Partnership that owns and manages the 800-car underground garage which is the most convenient place for visitors to the de Young to park. According to both IRS filings and a 2019 Recreation & Parks study, the garage is usually mostly empty. Drivers' reluctance to use it has been attributed to high prices and poor administration.

== Art collection ==
Dede Wilsey started collecting art after her husband's death in 2002. She says she started acquiring paintings to escape the sadness of her deceased husband, first buying a Monet, and then a Cassatt. Her collection includes paintings by Gerome, Monet (including a water lily), Kandinsky, Hockney, Picasso, Koons (egg) and commissioned paintings of her dogs.

In 2022, she acquired the painting The Grand Canal and the Church of the Salute (Canaletto, 1740) for the de Young museum.

In 2026, the de Young Museum exhibited Wilsey's Water Lilies in the blockbuster show Monet and Venice.

== Portrayal in fiction ==
Dede Halcyon, a character in Armistead Maupin's roman-fleuve Tales of the City, described by a reviewer of the 2019 miniseries based on the books as the "boozy art-patron friend" of the show's protagonist, is allegedly a "thinly-veiled portrayal" of Wilsey.

== See also ==
- Patricia Montandon
