= Douglas MacArthur II =

American diplomat (1909–1997)

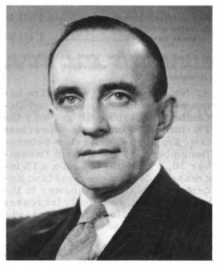
- MacArthur in 1965

United States Ambassador to Iran
- In office October 13, 1969 – February 17, 1972
- President: Richard Nixon
- Preceded by: Armin H. Meyer
- Succeeded by: Joseph S. Farland

United States Ambassador to Austria
- In office May 24, 1967 – September 16, 1969
- President: Lyndon B. Johnson; Richard Nixon
- Preceded by: James Williams Riddleberger
- Succeeded by: John P. Humes

9th Assistant Secretary of State for Legislative Affairs
- In office March 14, 1965 – March 6, 1967
- President: Lyndon B. Johnson
- Preceded by: Fred Dutton
- Succeeded by: William B. Macomber Jr.

United States Ambassador to Belgium
- In office May 9, 1961 – February 11, 1965
- President: John F. Kennedy; Lyndon B. Johnson
- Preceded by: William A. M. Burden
- Succeeded by: Ridgway B. Knight

16th United States Ambassador to Japan
- In office February 25, 1957 – March 12, 1961
- President: Dwight D. Eisenhower
- Preceded by: John M. Allison
- Succeeded by: Edwin Reischauer

10th Counselor of the United States Department of State
- In office March 30, 1953 – December 16, 1956
- President: Dwight D. Eisenhower
- Preceded by: Charles E. Bohlen
- Succeeded by: G. Frederick Reinhardt

Personal details
- Born: Douglas MacArthur II; July 5, 1909 Bryn Mawr, Pennsylvania, U.S.
- Died: November 15, 1997 (aged 88) Washington, D.C., U.S.
- Spouse: Laura Louise Barkley (m. 1934; died 1987)
- Children: Laura Goditiabois-Deacon (née MacArthur)
- Parent: Arthur MacArthur III (father)
- Education: Yale University
- Occupation: Diplomat

Military service
- Allegiance: United States
- Branch/service: U.S. Army Reserve
- Years of service: 1930s
- Rank: Second Lieutenant
- Unit: Field Artillery Branch

Douglas MacArthur II (July 5, 1909 – November 15, 1997) was an American diplomat. During his diplomatic career, he served as United States ambassador to Japan, Belgium, Austria, and Iran, as well as Assistant Secretary of State for Legislative Affairs. He was a nephew of the U.S. general Douglas MacArthur.

== Early life and education ==
MacArthur's parents were Captain Arthur H. MacArthur, III and Mary McCalla MacArthur. Through his mother, he was a grandson of Bowman H. McCalla, great-grandson of Colonel Horace Binney Sargent, and great-great-grandson of Lucius Manlius Sargent. Named for his uncle, General Douglas MacArthur, he was born in Bryn Mawr, Pennsylvania, in 1909.

MacArthur graduated from Milton Academy in Milton, Mass., and from Yale College, Class of 1932.

== Military Service ==
In the mid 1930s, MacArthur served as a second lieutenant in the U.S. Army Reserve, Field Artillery Branch. He also worked as an assistant to the sub-district supervisor in the Washington D.C. Army headquarters of sub-district 17.

== Diplomatic career ==
After serving as an Army officer, MacArthur began his Foreign Service career in 1935 with a post in Vancouver. He was assigned to Vichy France during the early years of World War II, served as secretary of the U.S. Embassy there from 1940 to 1942, and was interned in Baden Baden, Germany with other U.S. diplomatic staff and civilians for two years after the U.S. broke relations with the Vichy government. Following an internee exchange in March 1944, he served as part of General Dwight Eisenhower's political staff and then led the political section of the U.S. Embassy in Paris until 1948. He went on to become chief of the State Department's Division of Western European Affairs in 1949, where he assisted in the formation of NATO, and served as Counselor of the State Department from 1953 to 1956, where he led the U.S. negotiations for the SEATO treaty.

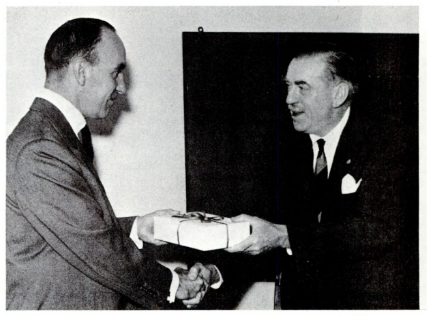
Douglas MacArthur II (left), then US Ambassador to Belgium, presents Basil F. Macgowan with a retirement gift

=== Ambassador to Japan ===
MacArthur was appointed U.S. Ambassador to Japan in December 1956 and presented his credentials in February 1957.

During his four years in Tokyo, MacArthur oversaw the re-negotiation of the U.S.-Japan Security Treaty, known as "Anpo" in Japanese. MacArthur appeared on the cover of the June 27, 1960, issue of Time magazine, in which he was characterized as "the principal architect of present-day U.S. policy toward Japan."

However, the new treaty was met with the massive Anpo Protests in Japan, and was only ratified with great difficulty. As the protests grew in size in June 1960, MacArthur summoned the heads of major newspapers and television station NHK to his office and demanded more favorable coverage of the treaty.

Then on June 10, MacArthur deliberately provoked the so-called "Hagerty Incident" (ハガチー事件, Hagachii jiken). That afternoon, MacArthur was leaving Tokyo's Haneda Airport in a black car carrying himself and President Eisenhower's press secretary James Hagerty, who had just arrived in Japan to prepare for a planned visit by Eisenhower, when MacArthur ordered that the car be deliberately driven into a large crowd of anti-treaty protesters. The mob surrounded the car and proceeded to smash the car's windows and tail lights, slash its tires, and dance on the roof until MacArthur and Hagerty finally had to be rescued by a U.S. Marine helicopter. MacArthur had hoped that by provoking the incident, he would force the Japanese government to carry out a more forceful police response to suppress the protests ahead of Eisenhower's planned arrival. However, MacArthur's gambit backfired, as widespread shock at the Hagerty Incident helped force prime minister Nobusuke Kishi to cancel Eisenhower's visit, for fears that his safety could not be guaranteed.

It was revealed in 1974 that MacArthur had negotiated a secret agreement with the Japanese foreign minister Aiichiro Fujiyama to allow the transit of American nuclear weapons through Japanese territory. It was also revealed, through documents declassified in the 2000s, that MacArthur pressured the Japanese judiciary, including Chief Justice Kōtarō Tanaka, to uphold the legality of the United States military presence in Japan after a lower court decision found it unconstitutional.

=== Other posts ===
Following his time in Japan, MacArthur served as Ambassador to Belgium (1961–1965), Assistant Secretary of State (1965–1967), Ambassador to Austria (1967–1969) and Ambassador to Iran (1969–1972). While in the latter post, he escaped an attempted kidnapping in 1970 by a network of opposition guerillas in Iran. Months later, Iranian military officials sentenced four guerrillas to life imprisonment for their involvement in the attempted kidnapping.

SAVAK also later claimed that sixty members of the Iranian Liberation Organization faced charges related to planned kidnapping.

== Personal life ==
He married Laura Louise Barkley on August 21, 1934; she was the daughter of future U.S. Vice President Alben Barkley. They had a daughter named Laura MacArthur, two grandchildren, and two great grandchildren. Douglas's daughter married Henry Goditiabois-Deacon, a Belgian man with whom she had a daughter. President Johnson signed a special bill conferring U.S. citizenship to Laura's daughter in 1965.

== Later life and death ==
MacArthur died in Washington, D.C., in 1997.

== Legacy ==
Douglas's addresses, speeches and statements, 1957-1995; correspondence as U.S. ambassador; writings of Douglas MacArthur II; and photographs of the MacArthur family, 1905 to 1997, were donated to the MacArthur Memorial by his daughter Laura MacArthur.

== See also ==
- Anpo protests
- Girard incident
- Hagerty Incident
- Treaty of Mutual Cooperation and Security between the United States and Japan

Diplomatic posts
Preceded by John M. Allison	United States Ambassador to Japan; 1957–1961	Succeeded by Edwin Reischauer
Preceded by William A. M. Burden	United States Ambassador to Belgium; 1961–1965	Succeeded by Ridgway B. Knight
Preceded by James W. Riddleberger	United States Ambassador to Austria; 1967–1969	Succeeded by John P. Humes
Preceded by Armin H. Meyer	United States Ambassador to Iran; 1969–1972	Succeeded by Joseph S. Farland
Government offices
Preceded by Fred Dutton	Assistant Secretary of State for Legislative Affairs; March 14, 1965 – March 6, 1967	Succeeded by William B. Macomber, Jr.
