= John F. Simmons =

American politician

John Farr Simmons
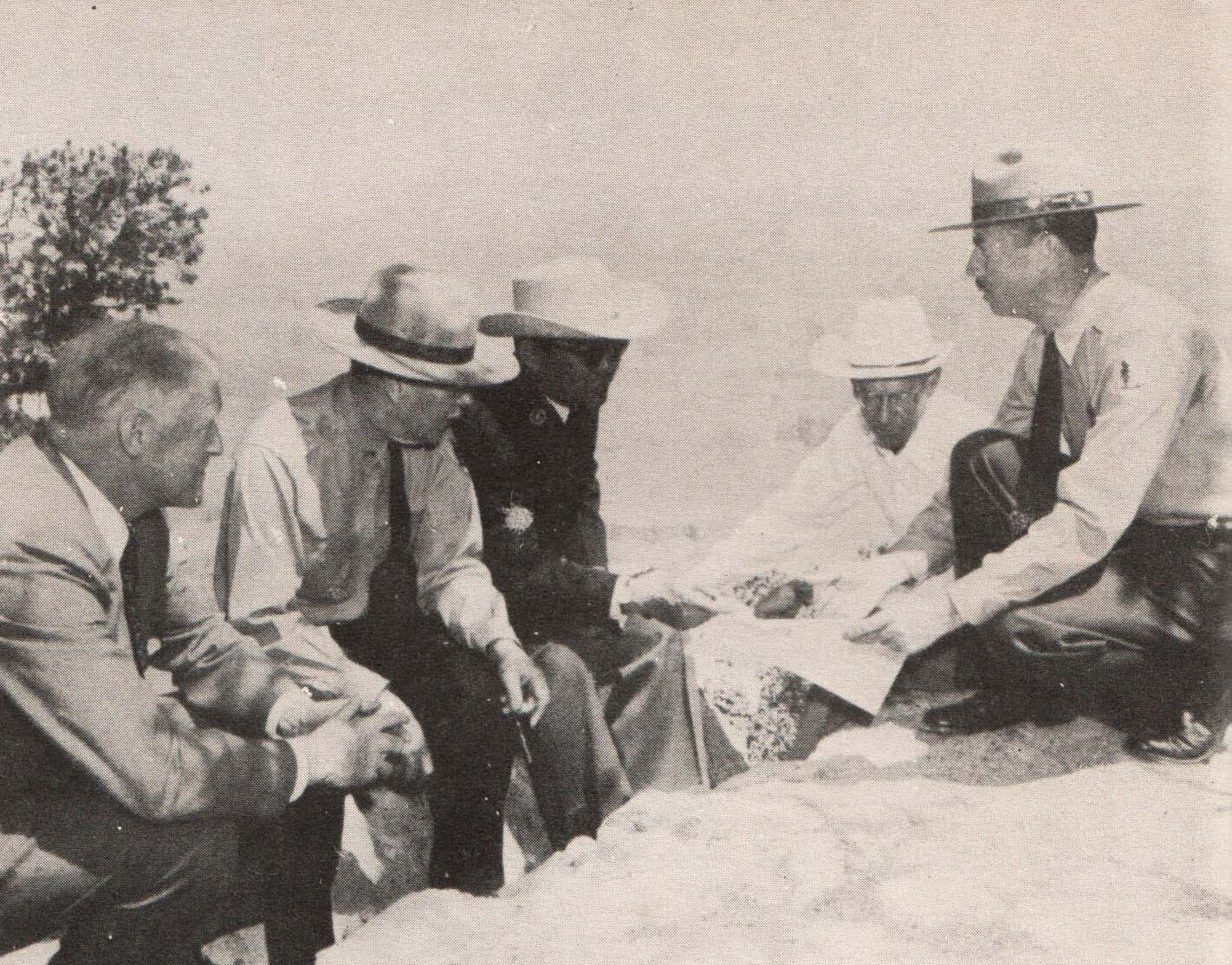
- Simmons (left) with Sukarno in 1956

8th Chief of Protocol of the United States
- In office August 18, 1950 – January 31, 1957
- President: Harry S. Truman; Dwight D. Eisenhower
- Preceded by: Stanley Woodward
- Succeeded by: Wiley T. Buchanan Jr.

United States Ambassador to Ecuador
- In office July 16, 1947 – July 12, 1950
- President: Harry S. Truman
- Preceded by: Robert M. Scotten
- Succeeded by: Paul C. Daniels

United States Ambassador to El Salvador
- In office February 21, 1945 – July 1, 1947
- President: Franklin D. Roosevelt
- Preceded by: Walter C. Thurston
- Succeeded by: Albert F. Nufer

Personal details
- Born: John Farr Simmons; January 3, 1892
- Died: January 1, 1968 (aged 75)

John Farr Simmons (January 3, 1892 – January 1, 1968) was an American diplomat who served as Chief of Protocol of the United States from 1950 to 1957. He also served as the U.S. ambassador to Ecuador and El Salvador in the late 1940s.

== Career ==
As a career Foreign Service Officer, Simmons was appointed the U.S. ambassador to El Salvador on September 21, 1944. He presented his credentials on February 21, 1945, and remained in the position for more than two years until he was chosen to become U.S. ambassador to Ecuador. He left El Salvador on July 1, 1947, and arrived in Ecuador later that month. He left the post on July 12, 1950.

Just over a week later, on July 21, 1950, Simmons was named to become Chief of Protocol at the U.S. State Department under President Harry S. Truman. He took office on August 18, 1950, and retained his role under President Dwight D. Eisenhower. He left the position on January 31, 1957.
