= Ray Abruzzo =

American actor (born 1954)

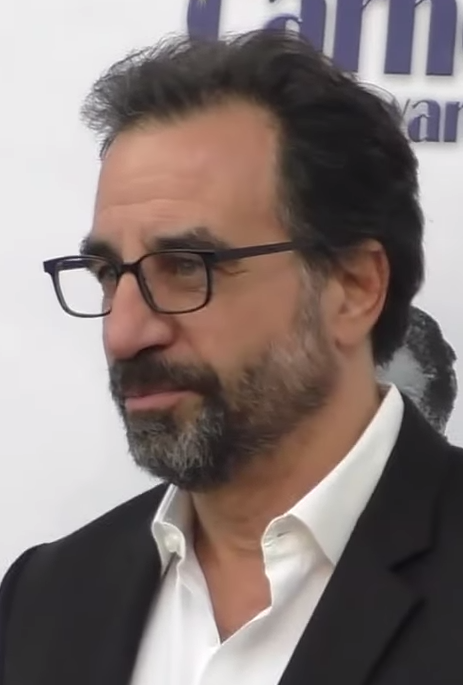
- Abruzzo at the Carney Awards in 2016
- Born: August 12, 1954 (age 72); Queens, New York, U.S.
- Occupation: Actor
- Years active: 1982–present

Raymond Peter Abruzzo (born August 12, 1954) is an American actor. He is best known for his role as Little Carmine Lupertazzi in The Sopranos, Detective Michael McGuire in The Practice (1998–2004) and Tony Giuliano in Night Court (1989–1991).

== Early life ==
Abruzzo was born in Queens, New York on August 12, 1954 and grew up in the Middle Village neighborhood. He is a graduate of Christ the King Regional High School in Middle Village, Queens, New York.

== Career ==
Abruzzo played police sergeant John Zorelli in 20 episodes of the ABC-TV series Dynasty from 1988 to 1989; Detective Michael McGuire in 44 episodes of The Practice from 1998 to 2004; and "Little" Carmine Lupertazzi in 16 episodes of The Sopranos from 2002 to 2007. He also played the part of Tony Guiliano, Christine Sullivan's fiancé, husband and then ex-husband in several episodes of the NBC-TV sitcom Night Court; he also makes a guest appearance in a different role in a Season 3 episode of the 2023 Night Court series.

Other television credits include a 1989 episode of Empty Nest, where he played cardiologist Dr. Leonard, NCIS, Murder, She Wrote, L.A. Law, House M.D., NYPD Blue, Lois & Clark: The New Adventures of Superman, Law & Order: Special Victims Unit, The Nanny, CSI: NY, Criminal Minds, Bones, Weinerville (head writer, stage manager and performed as the puppet chef Pops), In Plain Sight and Mad Men.

He was seen on the stage of the Pasadena Playhouse in the play, Mauritius, by Theresa Rebeck. He also played the title role in Lombardi.

Abruzzo starred in the longest single shot movie in American film history, Somebody Marry Me, written and directed by John Asher.

He is a supporter of SENS Research Foundation, a nonprofit organization dedicated to researching and treating the causes of aging.

== Filmography ==
=== Film ===
Year	Title	Role	Notes
1999	Scriptfellas	Johnny 'Two Times'	
2003	House of Sand and Fog	Frank	
2010	The Death of Socrates	Callias III	
2011	The Last Gamble	Ray	
2011	Snatched	Bernie	
2013	Somebody Marry Me	David Rosenberg	
2013	Last Vegas	Pit Boss	
2014	The Big Fat Stone	Detective Moreschi	
2015	Tooken	Dalmat	
2016	Creedmoria	Ernest Cahill	
2019	I Hate Kids	Walter	
2019	Feast of the Seven Fishes	Uncle Carmine	
2019	Bad Education	Howard Gluckin	
2019	Elsewhere	Cuco	
2026	Ugly Cry		

=== Television ===
Year	Title	Role	Notes
1982	Muggable Mary, Street Cop	Hospital Security Guard	Television film
1984	Paper Dolls	Lee Herbert	Episode #1.1
1985	Falcon Crest	Waiter #1	Episode: "Confessions"
1986	Riptide	Eric Peters	Episode: "Playing Hardball"
1986	Trapper John, M.D.	Thaddeus Coates	Episode: "Elusive Butterfly"
1987	Shell Game	Richard	Episode: "Pilot"
1987	21 Jump Street	Mario Delano	Episode: "America, What a Town"
1987–1988	L.A. Law	Anthony Gianelli	4 episodes
1988	CBS Summer Playhouse	Sergeant Vincent 'Mother' DiAnza	Episode: "Off Duty"
1988–1989	Dynasty	Sgt. John Zorelli	20 episodes
1989–1991	Night Court	Tony Giuliano	7 episodes
1990	Empty Nest	Dr. Leonard	Episode: "Change of Heart"
1992	Doogie Howser, M.D.	Dr. Angelis / Dr. Angelia	2 episodes
1993	Weinerville	Pops	3 episodes; also writer and producer
1993	Murder, She Wrote	Mike LaRocca	Episode: "For Whom the Ball Tolls"
1993	Silk Stalkings	Jack Sorkin	Episode: "The Perfect Alibi"
1994	Diagnosis: Murder	Mort Slater	Episode: "A Very Fatal Funeral"
1994	Lois & Clark: The New Adventures of Superman	Detective Wolfe	Episode: "That Old Gang of Mine"
1995	NYPD Blue	Curtis Cangelosi	Episode: "Boxer Rebellion"
1996	Her Last Chance	Martin Gundarsson	Television film
1996	The Burning Zone	Father Stephen	Episode: "St. Michael's Nightmare"
1997	Step by Step	Max Thomas	Episode: "A Star Is Born"
1998	The Nanny	Chopper Pilot	Episode: "The Honeymoon's Overboard"
1998–2004	The Practice	Detective Michael McGuire	44 episodes
2000	Touched by an Angel	Paul	Episode: "Quality Time"
2002–2007	The Sopranos	Little Carmine Lupertazzi	16 episodes
2004	Law & Order	Paul Raimondo	Episode: "Everybody Loves Raimondo's"
2004	Strong Medicine	Don Bronson	Episode: "Like Cures Like"
2004	Listen Up	Sal Vedetti	Episode: "The Gift of the Ton-I"
2005	CSI: NY	Bob Galanis	Episode: "Tri-Borough"
2005	Eyes	Mark Campbell	Episode: "Trial"
2006	Living with Fran	Bryan Markley	Episode: "Going to Bed with Fran"
2007	Murder 101	Bernard Alger	Episode: "If Wishes Were Horses"
2007	Bones	Ray Porter	Episode: "The Knight on the Grid"
2007	Shark	Lennie Rabinov	Episode: "Every Breath You Take"
2007, 2008	Boston Legal	USAG John Sciarra	2 episodes
2008	NCIS	Rick Azarri	Episode: "Nine Lives"
2008	Law & Order: Special Victims Unit	Gordon Vidal	Episode: "Babes"
2010	House	Lorenzo Wibberly	Episode: "Remorse"
2011	QuickBites	Martin	Episode: "Faceless"
2011–2012	In Plain Sight	A.U.S.A. Perillo	3 episodes
2012–2013	Happily Divorced	Carmine	2 episodes
2013	After All These Years	Artie Green	Television film
2013	Mad Men	Jonesy	3 episodes
2013	The Mentalist	Bill Mylar	Episode: "The Red Tattoo"
2014	Dads	Johnny	Episode: "Warner's Got It Made"
2014	Castle	Frank Russo	Episode: "That '70s Show"
2015	Criminal Minds	Frank Cosgrove	Episode: "Anonymous"
2015	Perception	Butcher	Episode: "Meat"
2015	Hot in Cleveland	Phil	2 episodes
2015	Brooklyn Nine-Nine	Michael Augustine	Episode: "Johnny and Dora"
2015	Ray Donovan	Goldberg	Episode: "Come and Knock on Our Door"
2015	Chicago P.D.	Frank	Episode: "Never Forget I Love You"
2015	Unforgettable	Shane McCloud	Episode: "All In"
2015–2017	Transparent	Sal	5 episodes
2016	The Night Of	Eddie	Episode: "Subtle Beast"
2016	Rush Hour	Beau	Episode: "O Hostage! My Hostage!"
2019	The Rookie	Fallow	Episode: "Tough Love"
2025	Night Court (2023 TV series)	Carl Santini	Recurring
