= John P. Humes Japanese Stroll Garden =

Japanese garden in Mill Neck, New York

Coordinates: 40°52′28.7″N 73°34′29.6″W

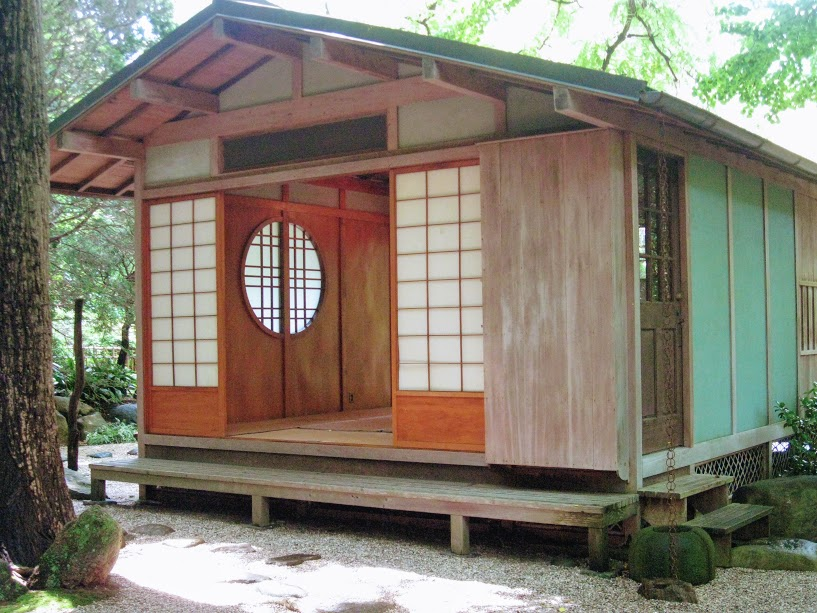
Tea house at the John P. Humes Japanese Stroll Garden

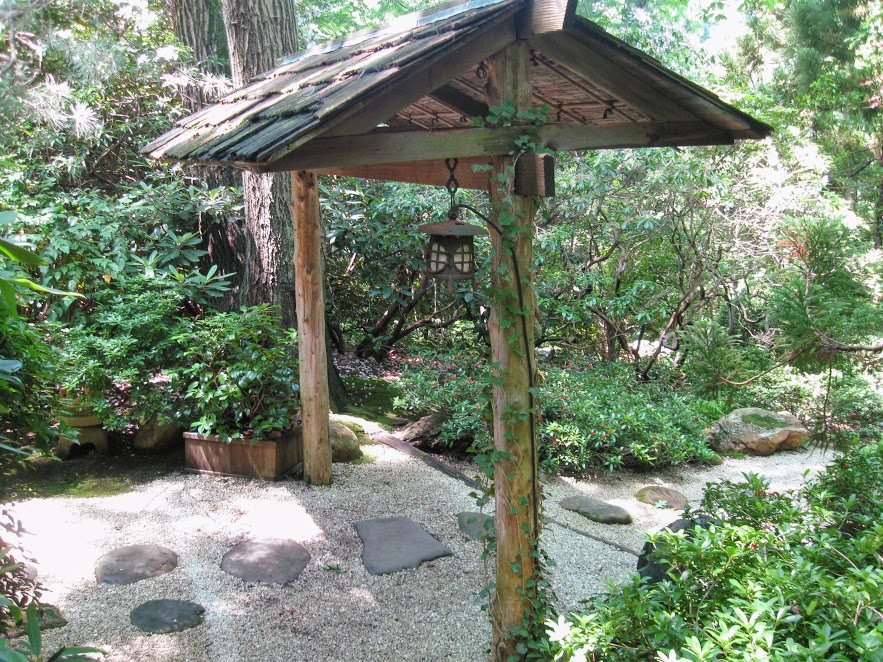
Pathway at the John P. Humes Japanese Stroll Garden

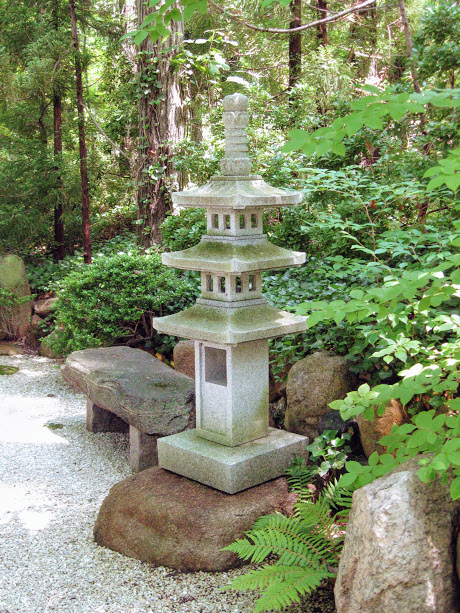
One of the moss-covered stone lanterns at the John P. Humes Japanese Stroll Garden

The John P. Humes Japanese Stroll Garden is a 7-acre (28,000 m^{2}) Japanese garden in Mill Neck, New York, providing a retreat for passive recreation and contemplation.

== History ==
Upon return from a trip to Kyoto, Japan in 1960, John Portner Humes, a lawyer then ambassador, began work on a Japanese garden. As a lawyer Humes worked for Mitsubishi and traveled to Japan for business. The garden was designed between 1962 and 1965 by Douglas and Jone DeFaya who used Japanese shrubs, trees and ground cover as well as symbolic placement of stones. The focal point of the garden is an imported tea house, in the design of the Ashikaga period, that was acquired in 1962. The sandalwood tea house was prefabricated in Taiwan and featured straw matting and rice paper door panels.

The garden was two-acres in size.

Humes was the U.S. ambassador to Austria from Oct. 29, 1969 to March 6, 1975. While the Humes family was living in Austria, the garden fell into disrepair and on their return, a landscape architect, Stephen Morrell, was hired full-time in 1982 to restore and enlarge the garden. Not only did Humes wish to restore the garden but he also wanted to open it to the public.

Morrell, a graduate of the New York Botanical Garden School of Horticulture, was sent on study trips twice to Japan by the Humes'

Of special interest in the garden are the winding stepping-stone walkways and gravel paths, stone lanterns, bamboo groves, a variety of mosses and a waterfall emptying into a koi pond. The bamboo is used for fences, for bottom of the tea house and as a water pipe. Japanese maples were planted as well as other Japanese trees, shrubs and groundcovers. In addition, there are more than 11 species of moss.

Moving through the garden, where the views, textures and balance of elements have been planned following Japanese aesthetic principles, visitors experience a walking meditation inducing inner peace. Stepping stones are used to control the rate at which one moves through the garden, encouraging moment-to-moment reflection. These stones, placed by the DeFayas, are local rocks with irregular shapes and varying sizes. Two paths connect the pond and tea house to the rest of the garden, one of them created on a declining hill.

The garden suggests a hillside landscape beside the sea, where gravel paths represent streams that form pools and cascades, eventually flowing into the ocean represented by a pond.

=== North Shore Wildlife Sanctuary ===
In 1980 it was donated to the North Shore Wildlife Sanctuary, and opened to the public in 1985. In 1993 the Garden Conservancy assumed management of the garden. The Conservancy hired the Long Island-based landscape design firm of Emile Kreye & Sons, Inc. to do restoration work on the pond, create a waterfall that flows into the pond and erect an eight foot high rock ridge. Other repair work included replacing a barrier wall.

The garden was increased from 2 acres to 7 acres in 2009.

Craftsman Peter Wechsler created a new red cedar entrance gate for the garden in 2000 and also restored the garden's tea house in 2012.

The Stroll Garden ran into financial problems in 2014 after the Garden Conservancy ended its management of the Stroll Garden at the end of 2013. It was operated by the Humes Japanese Garden Foundation until 2017 when The North Shore Land Alliance officially acquired the property on May 23, 2017. The North Shore Land Alliance is a not-for-profit land trust focusing on the North Shore of Long Island. The Garden is part of a conservation corridor owned by the North Shore Land Alliance that covers over 150 acres in the middle of the Beaver Brook watershed. The Land Alliance previously acquired the other portion of the Humes property in 2015.

After being closed for most of 2016 and 2017, the Stroll Garden reopened for three days a week in November 2017 and closed after the first freeze. In 2018, the Stroll Garden was open from 10 a.m. to 2 p.m. on Saturdays and 1-5 p.m. on Sundays. Opening day was May 12, 2018 and it closed for the season on Oct. 28, 2018. There were over 700 visitors to the garden in 2018 and over 3,500 visitors in 2021.

A major improvement to the property in 2018 was the installation of a 6-foot high deer fence to allow for the regrowth of vegetation that had been damaged by deer browse. It was funded by the New York State Conservation Partnership Program and private donations.

== See also ==
- List of botanical gardens in the United States
