= IfOnly =

- Founded: November 22, 2012; 13 years ago in San Francisco, United States
- Founder: Trevor Traina
- Headquarters: San Francisco, California, United States
- Key people: John Boris CEO; Joe Vierra CTO
- Number of employees: 100+
- Parent: Acquired by Mastercard Incorporated
- Website: www.ifonly.com

IfOnly was a San Francisco-based an e-commerce platform and charity venture, founded by Trevor Traina. The company offered donation and charity solutions with the aid of connecting audiences with sports, cooking, film, and music personalities.

The company marketed itself as seller of dreams and experiences. It connected individuals with luminaries.

The platform offered experiences to its members with celebrities including Dale DeGroff, Joe Montana, Kobe Bryant, Michael Chiarello, Tyler Florence, Richard Branson, Andre Agassi, Madonna, Shakira, Justin Timberlake, Robin Thicke, Greg Norman, John McEnroe, Thomas Keller, and Alice Waters.

The company closed in late 2019; it was folded into Mastercard's "Priceless" experiences marketplace.

== History ==
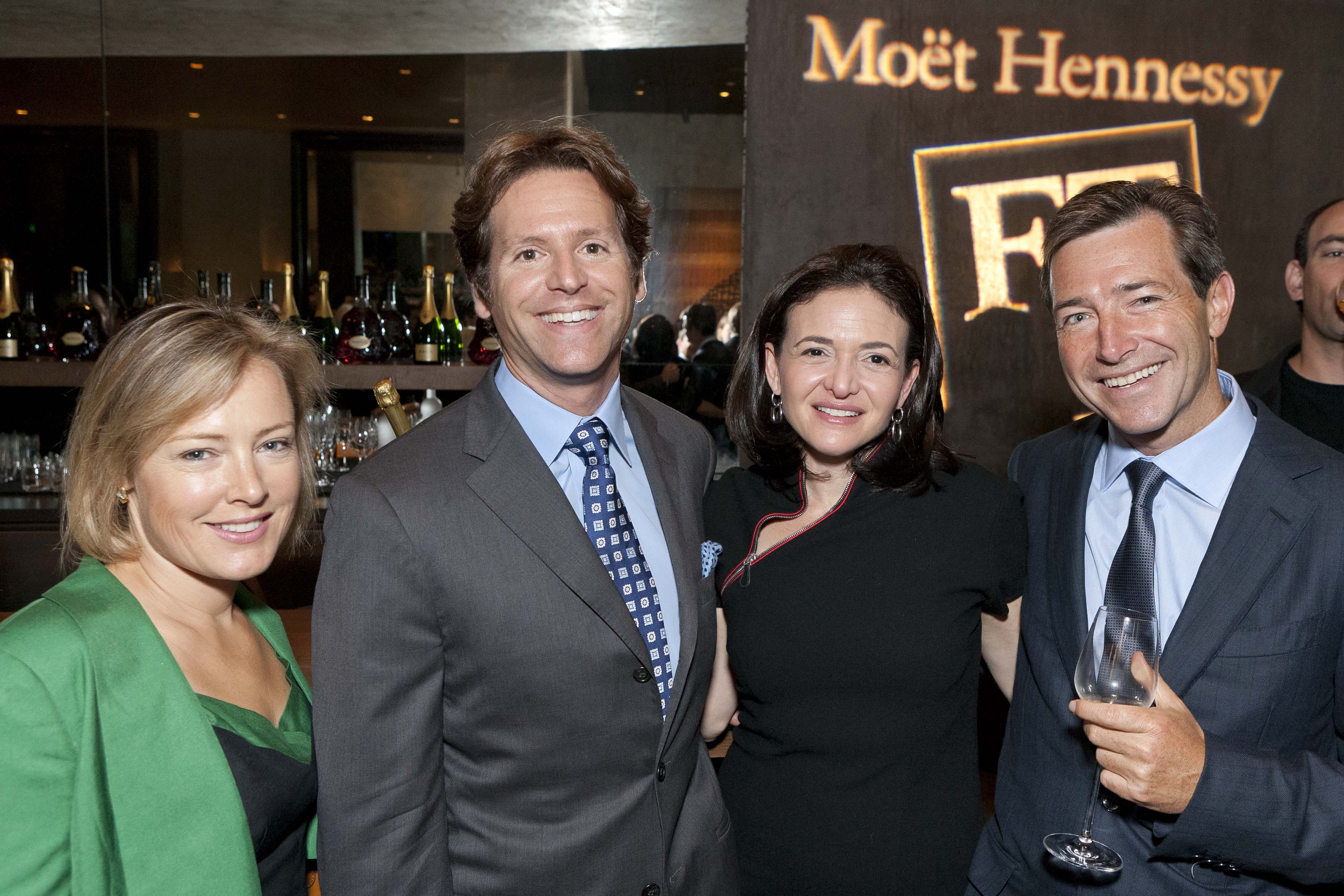
Gillian Tett, IfOnly founder Trevor Traina, Sheryl Sandberg, and John Ridding

IfOnly was founded in 2012 by Trevor Traina, a serial tech-entrepreneur.

In April 2018, John Boris assumed the position of CEO of IfOnly. Prior to IfOnly, Mr Boris spent six years as the Chief Marketing Officer for Shutterfly.

IfOnly partnered with the Big Red Group (BRG) in Australia in June 2019 to launch an Australian arm of the business, IfOnly Australia. The business launched on June 3, 2019.

In Q4 2019, IfOnly was acquired by Mastercard Incorporated, although the information did not become public until mid-2020.

== Funding ==
In February 2016, the company raised $10.25 million in Series B funding, from investors like Dropbox CEO Drew Houston, Nextdoor, CEO Nirav Tolia, Yucaipa Companies co-founder Ron Burkle, Advance Newhouse, Digital Garage, and XB Ventures.

In October, 2013, It received $12 Million in Series A round from investors including Yahoo! CEO Marissa Mayer, New Enterprise Associates, Khosla Ventures, Founders Fund, American Express Ventures, the Advance/Newhouse arm of Conde Nast and Allen & Co.

Earlier, IfOnly secured seed funding of $3 million from a group of investors including Salesforce CEO Marc Benioff, Yuri Milner, Nirav Tolia, SurveyMonkey CEO Dave Goldberg, Zynga CEO Mark Pincus, Yelp CEO Jeremy Stoppelman, Hosain Rahman, and Owen Van Natta.

In April 2018, the company raised an undisclosed amount in Series D funding led by Mastercard, and joined by other strategic investors, including Hyatt Hotels Corporation, Sotheby's, Founders Fund, New Enterprise Associates, Khosla Ventures, and TriplePoint Capital. However, TechCrunch reported, it secured $20 million in Series D funding. Also, in April 2018, John Boris joined the company as CEO

== See also ==
- Thuzio
