= Tallulah (film) =

2016 film directed by Sian Heder

- Theatrical release poster
- Directed by: Sian Heder
- Written by: Sian Heder
- Produced by: Heather Rae; Russell Levine; Chris Columbus; Eleanor Columbus; Todd Traina
- Starring: Elliot Page (Note: Initially credited as Ellen Page, Netflix updated the onscreen credits, from Ellen within a week (by December 8, 2020) of Page announcing his name change, as well as credits on other Page's works in its exclusive library of streaming products, including the film Flatliners (2017), the television series The Umbrella Academy (first two seasons, 2019–2020), and the television miniseries Tales of the City (2019).); Allison Janney; Tammy Blanchard
- Cinematography: Paula Huidobro
- Edited by: Darrin Navarro
- Music by: Michael Brook
- Production companies: Route One Entertainment; Ocean Blue Entertainment
- Distributed by: Netflix
- Release dates: January 23, 2016 (Sundance); July 29, 2016 (United States)
- Running time: 111 minutes
- Country: United States
- Language: English
- Budget: $6 million

Tallulah is a 2016 American comedy-drama film written and directed by Sian Heder (in her feature directorial debut) and starring Elliot Page, Allison Janney, and Tammy Blanchard. The film revolves around a young woman who unexpectedly takes a baby from an irresponsible mother and pretends the child is her own. Without a place to stay, the woman asks for help from her ex-boyfriend's mother, telling her the baby is her granddaughter.

Tallulah had its world premiere at the 2016 Sundance Film Festival on January 23, 2016 and was released on Netflix on July 29, 2016. It received positive reviews, and the performances of Page and Janney were praised. The film marked the third collaboration between Page and Janney, having last worked together in Juno (2007) and Touchy Feely (2013).

== Plot ==
Living in her rundown van while travelling around America, homeless teenager Tallulah and her boyfriend Nico survive the streets by stealing credit cards.

When Nico decides it is time to go home to his mother, Tallulah expresses her dismay and argues with Nico about how she will not change her lifestyle. Tallulah is devastated to discover the next morning that Nico has left without saying goodbye.

Desperate to be with him again, Tallulah drives to New York City, where Nico's mother, Margo, lives and finds her at her apartment. After informing Tallulah that she has not seen Nico in two years, Margo tells Tallulah to leave.

With nowhere else to go, Tallulah steals from guests at a nearby hotel, only for the strange natured and intoxicated mother, Carolyn, to mistake Tallulah as housekeeping staff. To Tallulah's confusion, Carolyn lets her child wander around naked and play with dangerous objects and admits that she is not invested in being a mother. Carolyn leaves her toddler, Maddison (Maddy), in Tallulah's care, while she goes on a date with a man who is not her husband. Tallulah bonds with the young Maddy, bathing her and playing games, before a devastated Carolyn arrives back at the hotel, distraught that the man did not want her.

After Carolyn drunkenly passes out, Tallulah prepares to leave, but impulsively decides to take a crying Maddy back to her van to spend the night until further notice. When Tallulah returns to the hotel with Maddy, she flees upon seeing the police, summoned by a panicked Carolyn, and goes to Margo's apartment. After Tallulah claims that the child is Nico's and that she is Margo's granddaughter, "Maggie," Margo reluctantly agrees to let them stay for one night.

Unknown to Tallulah, Margo is struggling with her own marital problems after her ex-husband Stephen has left her for a man, Andreas, and is pressing Margo to finalize their divorce. While Tallulah and Maddy stay with Margo, the three of them bond; Tallulah reveals her fears of forming relationships and Margo admits to having trouble letting go. However, Tallulah becomes increasingly aware that the authorities are looking for her and Maddy.

Meanwhile, a distressed Carolyn is questioned by a social worker, who notes that Carolyn has only expressed concern for herself so far instead of her missing child. Frustrated with their questioning, Carolyn leaves the hotel to distract herself and discovers that her husband has cancelled all her credit cards, much to her fury.

During a lunch with Stephen and Andreas, Margo defends Tallulah when Stephen begins to aggressively question Tallulah's relationships with Nico and Maddy. Margo lashes out at Stephen about their marriage and the deceit involved, pointing out that when all their friends supported Stephen, Margo had been left alone to reconcile the changes in her life and losing the family she loved.

On their way back to Margo's apartment, Tallulah and Carolyn notice one another as the latter goes by in a cab. Just before Carolyn catches up to them, Tallulah narrowly escapes with Maddy and Margo via the subway.

When Margo demands to know why Tallulah ran, an argument ensues and Tallulah runs off with a feverish Maddy to a pier that Nico had once told Tallulah was his favorite place. Nico arrives, having finally returned to his mother in New York City.

Taking Maddy to the hospital, Nico devises a plan to allow Tallulah to escape. At Margo's apartment, Carolyn and the police arrive after a tip from Stephen and Andreas, who recognized Tallulah from a newspaper article reporting Maddy's abduction.

Carolyn admits to Margo that she did not want to be a mother and feels no maternal instinct, despite loving her daughter; Margo comforts her. At a subway station, Tallulah calls Margo to apologize for involving her, and the police trace the call. Tallulah tries to get on the subway in order to flee, but instead returns to Maddy and Nico at the hospital. The police, Carolyn, and Margo arrive at the hospital, where an emotional Tallulah accuses Carolyn of not wanting Maddy.

After a tearful Carolyn tells her that she does want her child, Tallulah reluctantly hands Maddy back to her and is arrested by the police. As Tallulah is taken away, Margo promises to help her however she can. When Detective Richards facetiously asks Tallulah if she has a habit of taking children into protective custody, Tallulah says nothing and smiles ruefully.

Some time later, Margo wanders through Central Park before lying in the grass, recalling her conversation with Tallulah about letting go. Margo starts floating away happily, but then appears frightened and grabs a tree branch.

== Cast ==
- Elliot Page as Tallulah "Lu"
- Allison Janney as Margaret "Margo" Mooney
- Tammy Blanchard as Carolyn Ford
- Evan Jonigkeit as Nico "Nick" Mooney
- David Zayas as Detective Richards
- John Benjamin Hickey as Stephen Mooney
- Zachary Quinto as Andreas
- Uzo Aduba as Detective Louisa Kinnie
- Fredric Lehne as Russell Ford
- Evangeline and Liliana Ellis as Madison "Maddy/Maggie" Ford
- Felix Solis as Manuel
- Maddie Corman as Vera

== Production ==
Tallulah was written and directed by Sian Heder as a spin-off of her 2006 short film Mother, about a homeless woman who is forced to babysit a toddler with an irresponsible mother at a hotel. By the time that Mother was released in May 2006, Heder had completed the feature-length screenplay for Tallulah, based on her perception of women who "probably know they shouldn't have kids, but then they do it anyway".

The story was inspired by her experience of working as a babysitter for hotel guests in Los Angeles, when she was once required to babysit a toddler whose neglectful mother had come to a Beverly Hills hotel in order to have an extramarital affair. She said that, after the incident, "I left the hotel, got in my car and cried the whole way home, and I thought, I should have taken that kid."

In May 2015, it was announced that Elliot Page and Allison Janney would star in the film's lead roles, after working together previously on Juno (2007) and Touchy Feely (2013). Filming began in June 2015 in New York City, primarily in the borough of Manhattan. The film was produced by Heather Rae, Russell Levine, Chris Columbus, Eleanor Columbus and Todd Traina, and financed by Route One Entertainment and Ocean Blue Entertainment.

Michael Lloyd and Cutting Edge Group produced the soundtrack of songs inspired by the film's screenplay. Michael Brook composed the film's score.

== Release ==
Tallulah had its world premiere at the 2016 Sundance Film Festival on January 23, 2016. Prior to the film's premiere at the festival, Netflix acquired distribution rights to the film. The film was released on July 29, 2016.

The film was removed from Netflix on July 29, 2026, due to the expiration of its distribution and licensing agreements.

== Reception ==
Tallulah received positive reviews from critics, who praised the two lead performances. On Rotten Tomatoes, the film has a rating of 85%, based on 55 reviews, with an average rating of 6.8/10. The website's critical consensus reads, "Tallulah's narrative insight, thoughtfully written characters, and talented cast add up to an absorbing family drama that transcends genre tropes and capably overcomes its flirtations with melodrama." On Metacritic, the film holds a score of 63 out of 100, based on 19 reviews, indicating "generally favorable reviews".

Nigel M. Smith of The Guardian gave the film 4 out of 5 stars, wrote that "Yes, the story has the makings of a Lifetime movie; what grounds it are the terrific performances and Heder's rich direction and screenplay", and he praised Page's and Janney's performances. Geoff Berkshire of Variety also praised the two leads and stated "Heder's script likely won't please those who prefer their indie dramas naturalistic and event-free. But the freewheeling storytelling enacted here has an excellent anchor in the grounded work of the ensemble cast."
