= IX XI =

2026 documentary film

- Film poster
- Directed by: Sean Wilsey
- Written by: Sean Wilsey
- Produced by: Sean Wilsey; Krista Parris
- Cinematography: Autie Carlisle
- Edited by: Zara Serabian-Arthur; Nic Seago; Tristan Daley
- Music by: Milena Erke; Randall Poster; Mira Wilsey
- Release date: June 4, 2026 (Tribeca Festival)
- Running time: 86 minutes
- Country: United States
- Languages: English; Urdu; Mandarin; Spanish; French; German

IX XI is a 2026 American documentary film about 12 New Yorkers who talk about their lives before and during the September 11 attacks. Cartoonist Roz Chast and actor Griffin Dunne are among those people. The film is produced, written, and directed by Sean Wilsey. It premiered at the Tribeca Festival in June 2026.

== Reception ==
Andrew F. Peirce of The Curb called IX XI a "magnificent documentary...a compelling, funny, and riveting debut film." Emma Green of Photobook Magazine said, "Rather than presenting a unified account, IX XI reveals the diversity of emotional responses: from fear and confusion to resilience, grief, humor, and unexpected moments of connection. As the stories unfold, the film becomes less about the attacks themselves and more about what remained afterward: the vulnerability of a city, the fragility of everyday life, and the unexpected ways trauma can connect strangers." Blogger Alex Smith of Flaming Pablum said it "boldly eschews a conventionally staid re-telling of that day's sequence of events in favor of an intermingled aggregation of personal accounts from a wide array of social tiers. From a UPS guy to a plucky journalist to a skateboarder to a real estate agent to a chef to a celebrated actor to a cartoonist and all stripes in between, this cast conveys their respective experiences with warmth, pathos, introspection, poignancy, humility and humor."

Rick Hong of Film Threat gave the film a score of 6 out of 10, writing, "This September will be the 25th anniversary of the 9/11 attacks, and for those curious for a different perspective, IX XI is something to look at." Sara Clements of Next Best Picture also gave the film a score of 6 out of 10 and wrote, "You can't say that IX XI is the best documentary about 9/11, but it does attempt to capture that day differently, without uncovering anything revelatory about the event. But it doesn't really need to – it's about the human experience of it all."
