= Beaulieu, Newport =

Historic building in Rhode Island, USA

Beaulieu
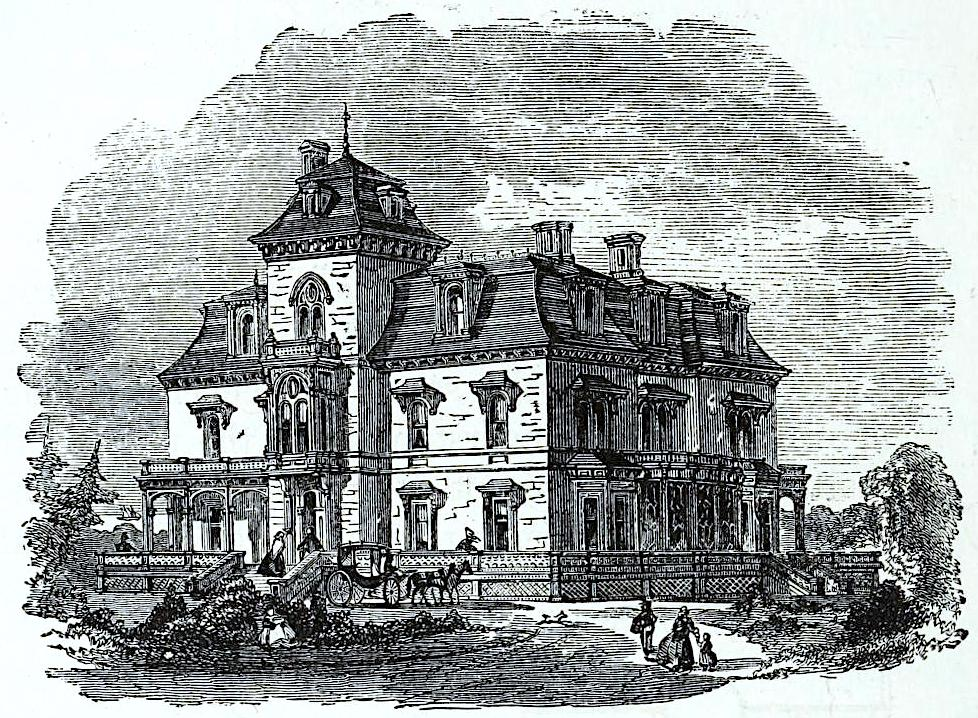
- The house as designed by Calvert Vaux

General information
- Type: Residence
- Architectural style: Second Empire
- Location: Newport, Rhode Island, US, 615 Bellevue Avenue
- Coordinates: 41°27′40″N 71°18′17″W
- Construction started: 1859
- Completed: 1860
- Client: Federico Barreda
- Owner: Ruth Buchanan Wheeler

Design and construction
- Architect: Calvert Vaux

Beaulieu is a historic mansion located on Bellevue Avenue in Newport, Rhode Island, built in 1859 by Federico Barreda. Subsequent owners of Beaulieu have included John Jacob Astor III, Cornelius Vanderbilt III, and his wife Grace Vanderbilt, née Grace Graham Wilson.

== History ==
One of Newport's oldest mansions, Beaulieu was originally built in 1859 by the Peruvian merchant, Federico Barreda, who made his money in the 1850s guano trade. (Note: Federico Barreda was only twenty-five in 1851 when he was sent to Baltimore, by his brother Felipe, who had secured the contract for the U.S. guano market from the Peruvian government, to oversee distribution of the valuable fertilizer in the United States. Guano riches made the Barredas into wealthy Peruvian oligarchs. In 1853, Federico Barreda married his niece, Matilde Laverrerie Barreda, who was to become the matriarch of the U.S. wing of the Barreda family. The Newport summer residence was built for lavish entertaining that would establish Matilde's place in elite U.S. circles.) Beaulieu was designed for Barreda by New York architect Calvert Vaux, who also designed the bridges in New York's Central Park. In July 1859, Barreda paid $24,000 for about nine acres on the Bellevue Avenue hill overlooking Narrangansett Bay. He then hired Vaux for a five percent fee on a construction budget of $100,000. Eventually he went over his budget, and spent at least $26,000 more on furnishings and interior decoration. This seasonal "cottage" had sixteen bedrooms, a library, billiard room, a wide surrounding veranda and ample quarters for housekeepers, nannies and cooking staff.

It was once described as "the most pretentious and elaborate villa in Newport," and Barreda's wife later claimed that she supervised up to eighteen servants there. Shortly after the mansion was completed, Barreda was named Peru's minister in Washington. He hired New York City's Delmonico's restaurant to cater one of the first social events held in Beaulieu.

=== The Astors and Vanderbilts ===
After the Barredas suffered a reversal of financial fortune, John Jacob Astor III, who was a friend of the Barredas, purchased the mansion and gave it the name Beaulieu, which means "Beautiful place". The mansion neighbored Beechwood, the Newport estate of Astor's brother, William Backhouse Astor Jr. and his wife Caroline, known as "The Mrs. Astor", who ruled society in both New York City and Newport. Caroline considered Astor's daughter-in-law, Mary Dahlgren (née Paul) Astor, the wife of Astor's only son William Waldorf Astor (who inherited Beaulieu after the death of John Jacob Astors III's wife in 1887), her only serious social rival. In 1892, the new-moneyed Vanderbilts, who made much of their wealth in shipping and railroads, spent $11 million to construct Marble House between Beaulieu and Beechwood, at which point Caroline was forced to compete with the formidable Alva Vanderbilt for social prominence. Caroline Astor made social life so unbearable for Mary and William Waldorf Astor, that William left the country and moved to England in 1901, where he later became the 1st Viscount Astor.

After William Waldorf Astor moved abroad, he agreed to rent his home to Cornelius Vanderbilt III "Neily", a great-grandson of the "Commodore" Cornelius Vanderbilt. The Vanderbilt family eventually bought the house outright from the Astors in 1911. Once occupied by Neily and his wife, Grace Vanderbilt, the home was again the scene of many social gatherings and popular society.

=== Present day ===
After the death of Cornelius Vanderbilt III in 1942 and his wife in 1953, the house was vacant for several years until it was eventually purchased in 1961 for $100,000 by the U.S. Ambassador to Austria and Luxembourg Wiley T. Buchanan Jr., who immediately reconstructed a deep porch on the east side of the house, facing the sea. The first formal party after the new owners took possession was to host and honor the future King Juan Carlos and Queen Sofía of Spain.

The family of the late widow of former Ambassador Wiley T. Buchanan Jr., Ruth Buchanan Wheeler (1918–2019), an heiress to the Dow Chemical fortune and mother of Dede Wilsey, owns the Gilded Age edifice. Beaulieu sold in 2020 for $12,264,000. Currently, the house is in private hands and is not available for public viewing.
