= John P. Humes =

American lawyer and diplomat (1921–1985)

United States Ambassador to Austria
- In office October 29, 1969 – March 6, 1975
- President: Richard Nixon; Gerald Ford
- Preceded by: Douglas MacArthur II
- Succeeded by: Wiley T. Buchanan Jr.

Personal details
- Born: John Portner Humes; July 21, 1921 New York City, New York, U.S.
- Died: September 30, 1985 (aged 64) Glen Cove, New York, U.S.
- Party: Republican
- Spouse: Jean Cooper Schmidlapp (m. 1950)
- Children: 6
- Education: St. Paul's School
- Alma mater: Princeton University; Fordham University School of Law

John Portner Humes (July 21, 1921 – September 30, 1985) was an American lawyer, diplomat and author who served as the United States Ambassador to Austria.

== Early life ==
Humes attended St. Paul's School in Concord, New Hampshire, and the Woodrow Wilson School of Public and International Affairs at Princeton University, graduating in 1943.

Following his service in the war, he attended Fordham University School of Law, graduating in 1948.

== Career ==
During World War II, Humes served with the U.S. Army Signal Corps Intelligence Service in the European Theater.

After receiving his law degree, Mr. Humes became an associate with Shearman & Sterling, a New York law firm. From 1956 to 1969 he was a partner in the New York law firm Andrews & Botzow, which became Humes, Andrews & Botzow.

Hume, an avid squash player who was the New York state champion in 1950, served as president of the United States Squash Racquets Association from 1954 to 1956.

=== Diplomatic career ===
On September 26, 1969, Humes was appointed by President Richard Nixon as the United States' Ambassador Extraordinary and Plenipotentiary to Austria. He presented his credentials in Vienna on October 29, 1969. Humes' mission was terminated when he left his post on March 6, 1975, and was succeeded by Wiley T. Buchanan Jr.

While in Vienna, he wrote his memoirs (in two volumes), which were later compiled into a book, Quadruple Two : Excerpts from the Vienna Diaries of Ambassador John Portner Humes which was used as a text for students at the School of Foreign Service at Georgetown University.

After retiring in 1975, Humes was active as a member of the board of directors of the Council of American Ambassadors and the board of visitors of the School of Foreign Service at Georgetown University.

== Personal life ==
In 1950, Humes married Dr. Jean Cooper Schmidlapp, the daughter of banker Carl Jacob Schmidlapp and Frances (née Cooper) Schmidlapp. Jean, a cousin of Broadway producer W. Horace Schmidlapp, attended the Foxcroft School and later graduated from Vassar College in 1945, and Cornell University Medical College, where she received her MD, in 1949. Together, they were the parents of six sons: Andrew, Christopher, Cooper, Carl, David, and John Portner Humes Jr. They lived together at Rumpus House, their 28-acre (11 ha) estate in Mill Neck, New York.

Humes died of a stroke at the Community Hospital in Glen Cove on Long Island on September 30, 1985.

=== Legacy ===
The John P. Humes Japanese Stroll Garden, a Japanese garden in Mill Neck, is named in his honor.

Diplomatic posts
Preceded by Douglas MacArthur II	United States Ambassador to Austria; 1969–1975	Succeeded by Wiley T. Buchanan Jr.
