= Going to California (TV series) =

- Also known as: G2C; GTC
- Created by: Scott Rosenberg
- Starring: Sam Trammell; Brad William Henke; John Asher; Audrey Marie Anderson
- Theme music composer: Old 97's
- Opening theme: Lost Along the Way
- Country of origin: United States
- Original language: English
- No. of seasons: 1
- No. of episodes: 20

Production
- Production location: Various
- Running time: 45–58 minutes
- Production companies: Industry Entertainment; Nitram Pictures; Columbia TriStar Domestic Television (Note: Credited as Columbia TriStar Television (2001)); Showtime Networks

Original release
- Network: Showtime
- Release: August 9, 2001 – February 14, 2002

Related
- October Road

Going to California is an American dramedy television series created for Showtime and airing from August 9, 2001 to February 14, 2002. It starred Sam Trammell and Brad William Henke as Kevin "Space" Lauglin and Henry "Hank" Ungalow, two friends on a road trip across the United States. The show focused on what happened to Hank and Space during their stops and detours along the way to California. John Mallory Asher played the character Insect Bob and also served as a director. The tag line was: "No map. No plan. No rules. No turning back."

Guest stars included Lindsay Sloane, Jenny McCarthy (John Asher's then wife), David Faustino, Jaime Pressly, Vince Vaughn, Stacey Dash, Rosanna Arquette and Jerry O'Connell.

It was cancelled in 2002 after 20 episodes despite a positive critical response, and despite a cult following it has never been issued on DVD. In 2007 creator Scott Rosenberg returned with the show October Road, which was loosely based on Going to California; Evan Jones reprised his role as Ikey and Geoff Stults played Eddie Latekka, two characters from the original show, while Brad William Henke and Sean Gunn played new characters. The character Baggo was also referenced, but unseen. The town of Bishop Flats was featured in both shows.

== Cast ==
- Sam Trammell as Kevin 'Space' Lauglin
- Brad Henke as Henry 'Hank' Ungalow
- John Asher
- Audrey Marie Anderson

== Episodes ==
No.	Title	Directed by	Written by	Original release date
1	"Blowing Free"	Peter Howitt	Scott Rosenberg	August 9, 2001
2	"Blowing Free"	Peter Howitt	Scott Rosenberg	August 9, 2001
3	"Taking Care of Biscuits"	Griffin Dunne	Jeff Melvoin	August 16, 2001
4	"I Know Why the Caged Rhino Sings"	D.J. Caruso	Story by : Scott Rosenberg; Teleplay by : Scott Rosenberg and Jeffrey Fiskin	August 23, 2001
5	"Rules of the Rod"	D.J. Caruso	Allison Adler	August 30, 2001
6	"Apocalypse Cow"	Greg Yaitanes	Josh Appelbaum & André Nemec	September 6, 2001
7	"The Big Padoodle"	John Asher	Allison Adler and Josh Appelbaum & André Nemec & Jeff Melvoin	September 20, 2001
8	"Fodder Figures"	D.J. Caruso	Tyler Bensinger	September 27, 2001
9	"The Naked and the Nude"	D.J. Caruso	Scott Rosenberg	October 4, 2001
10	"A Pirate Looks at 15 to 20"	D.J. Caruso	Stuart Zicherman	October 11, 2001
11	"Hurricane Al: A Tale of Key Largo"	Perry Lang	Tyler Bensinger	October 18, 2001
12	"This Year's Model"	Greg Yaitanes	Josh Appelbaum & André Nemec	October 25, 2001
13	"Our Sunshine State of Affair"	John Asher	Jeff Melvoin	November 1, 2001
14	"Lily of the Field"	Tim Hunter	Jeff Melvoin and Scott Rosenberg	November 8, 2001
15	"A Little Hard in the Big Easy"	Greg Yaitanes	Scott Rosenberg & Josh Appelbaum & André Nemec	January 10, 2002
16	"Home Games"	Bobby Roth	Allison Adler	January 17, 2002
17	"Waiting for Gordo"	John Asher	Turk Pipkin	January 24, 2002
18	"Mixed Doubles"	D.J. Caruso	Phil M. Rosenberg	January 31, 2002
19	"Searching for Eddie Van Halen"	Greg Yaitanes	Jim Hershleder	February 7, 2002
20	"The West Texas Round-up and Other Assorted Misdemeanors"	Gary Fleder	Scott Rosenberg	February 14, 2002
