= Milton A. Wolf =

American diplomat, investment banker and real estate developer

United States Ambassador to Austria
- In office June 23, 1977 – March 2, 1980
- President: Jimmy Carter
- Preceded by: Wiley T. Buchanan, Jr.
- Succeeded by: Philip Mayer Kaiser

Personal details
- Born: May 29, 1924
- Died: May 19, 2005 (aged 80)
- Party: Democratic Party
- Spouse: Rosyln Wolf
- Children: Leslie Wolf; Caryn Wolf Wechsler; Nancy Wolf; Sherri Wolf
- Occupation: Diplomat; Real estate developer

Milton Albert Wolf (May 29, 1924 – May 19, 2005) was an American diplomat, investment banker, and real estate developer from Cleveland, Ohio.

== Early life and education ==
Wolf earned a Bachelor of Science degree in civil engineering from the Case Institute of Technology, as well as a Master's and PhD in economics from Case Western Reserve University. He also held a bachelor's degree in chemistry and biology from Ohio State University.

== Career ==
Wolf was a Jewish community leader and Democratic Party contributor. In 1977, he was appointed by President Jimmy Carter to serve as U.S. Ambassador to Austria, holding the position until 1980. During his tenure as ambassador to Austria, Wolf represented the United States in the U.N. Conference on Science and Technology, served as chairman of the Fulbright Committee of Austria, and played a key role in arranging a meeting between President Carter and Soviet leader Leonid Brezhnev to sign the Strategic Arms Limitation Treaty (SALT II) in Vienna on June 19, 1979. Upon the conclusion of his diplomatic posting in 1980, Wolf founded a private investment firm Milton A. Wolf Investors. He was also president for 28 years of a construction company that developed several shopping centers and high-rise buildings in Cleveland, Ohio.

== Personal life ==
His wife of 53 years, Roslyn, died in 2001. They had four children: a son, Leslie Wolf, and three daughters, Caryn Wolf Wechsler, Dr. Nancy Wolf, and Sherri Wolf. He died of lymphoma on May 19, 2005. The funeral was held at the Park Synagogue in Cleveland Heights, Ohio and he was buried in the Bet Olam Cemetery in Beachwood.

== Decorations and awards ==
- Grand Decoration of Honour in Gold with Sash of the Order of Merit of the Republic of Austria
- Golden Medal of Honour of Salzburg
- Austrian Cross of Honour for Science and Art, 1st class (1997)
- Raoul Wallenberg International Humanitarian Award (1994)

== Professional affiliations ==
- Governor of the United Nations Association of the United States
- Trustee of Case Western Reserve University
- Member of the board of directors for the Institute for the Study of Diplomacy at Georgetown University
- Chairman of the American Austrian Foundation
- Member of the Council on Foreign Relations
- Trustee of the Council on World Affairs

Diplomatic posts
Preceded by Wiley T. Buchanan, Jr.	U.S. Ambassador to Austria; 1977–1980	Succeeded by Philip Mayer Kaiser
