= Somebody Marry Me =

- Directed by: John Asher
- Written by: John Asher
- Starring: Ray Abruzzo; Deborah Baker Jr. Marlane Barnes
- Production companies: Big Disco Films; Glass Horse Films
- Release date: June 30, 2013 (United States)
- Running time: 101 minutes
- Country: United States
- Language: English

Somebody Marry Me is an American 2013 romantic comedy film written and directed by John Asher.

It is the longest single shot movie in American film history.
