= The Grand Canal and the Church of the Salute =

Painting by Canaletto

Il Canal Grande e la chiesa di Santa Maria della Salute
- The Grand Canal at the Church of the Salute (English)
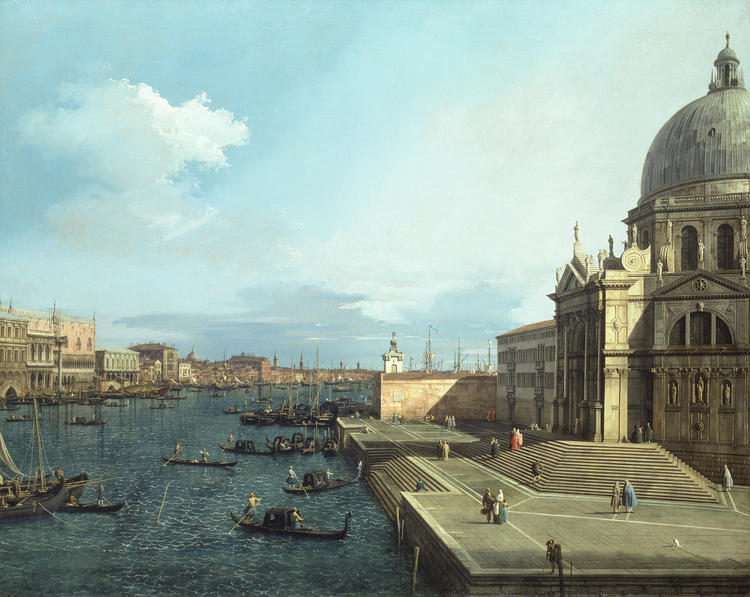
- Artist: Canaletto
- Year: c.1740
- Medium: Oil on canvas
- Dimensions: 151 cm × 121 cm (59 in × 48 in)

The Grand Canal at the Church of the Salute (Italian: Il Canal Grande e la chiesa di Santa Maria della Salute) is an oil on canvas painting by the Italian artist Canaletto. It is a Rococo landscape painting, completed circa 1740. It measures 151 by 121 centimeters (59 in × 48 in) and is now in the Emil Georg Bührle collection, Zurich, Switzerland.

A rendition of this work is similar to that purchased by King George III, which is currently held as part of the Royal Collection Trust.

== Gallery ==
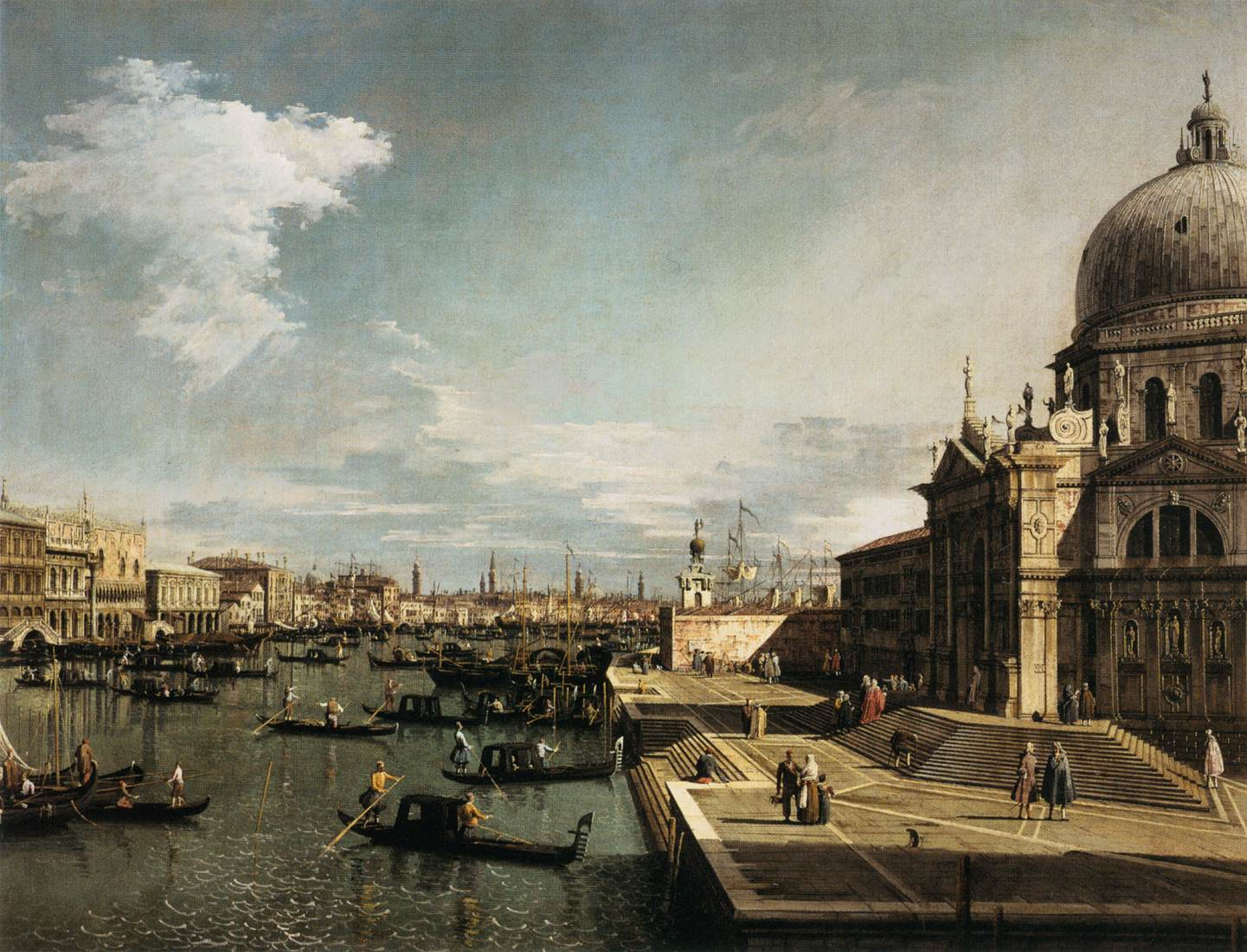
A copy by Bernardo Bellotto in the Louvre, is sometimes confused with this work

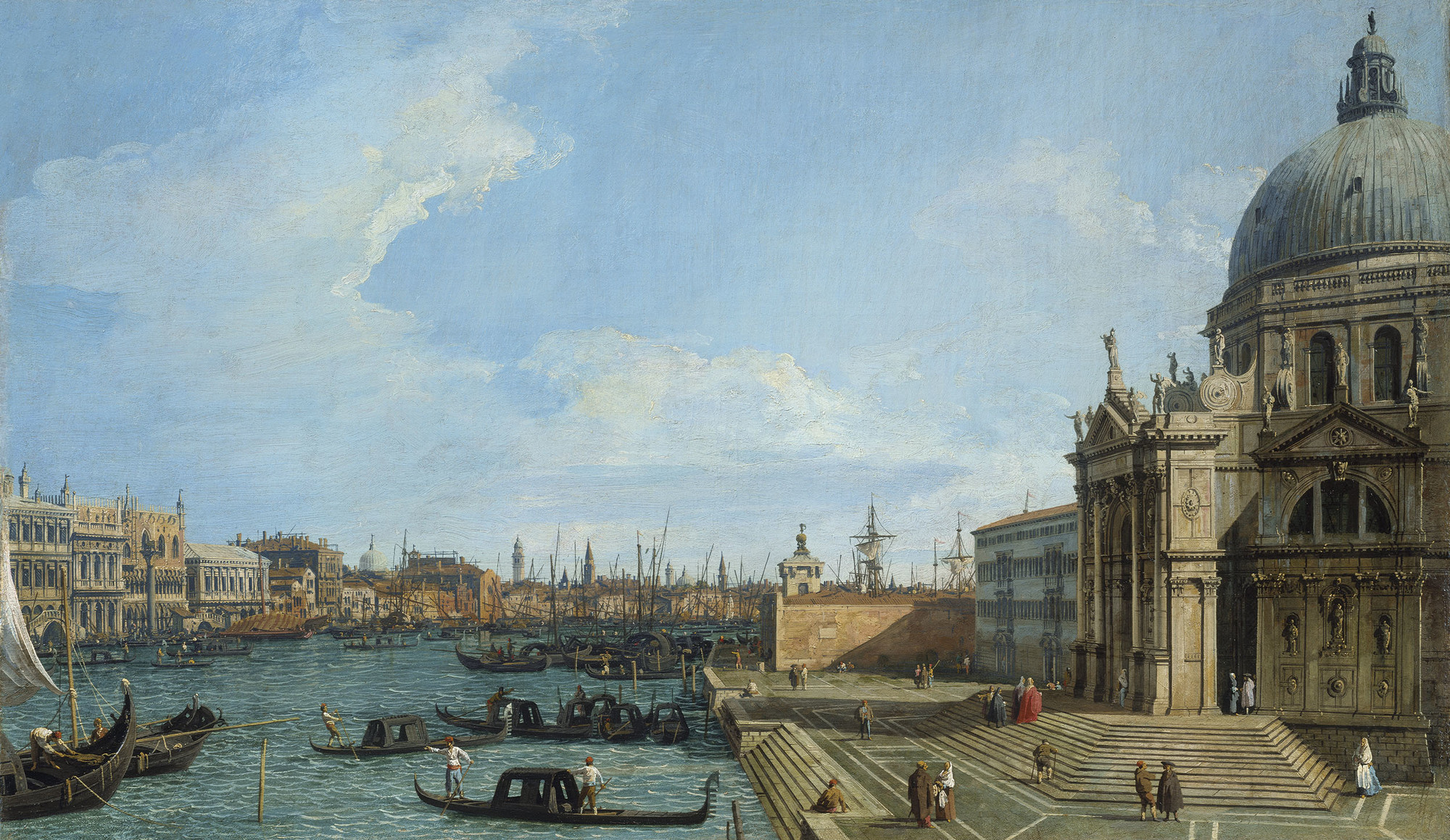
Version in the United Kingdom Royal Collection

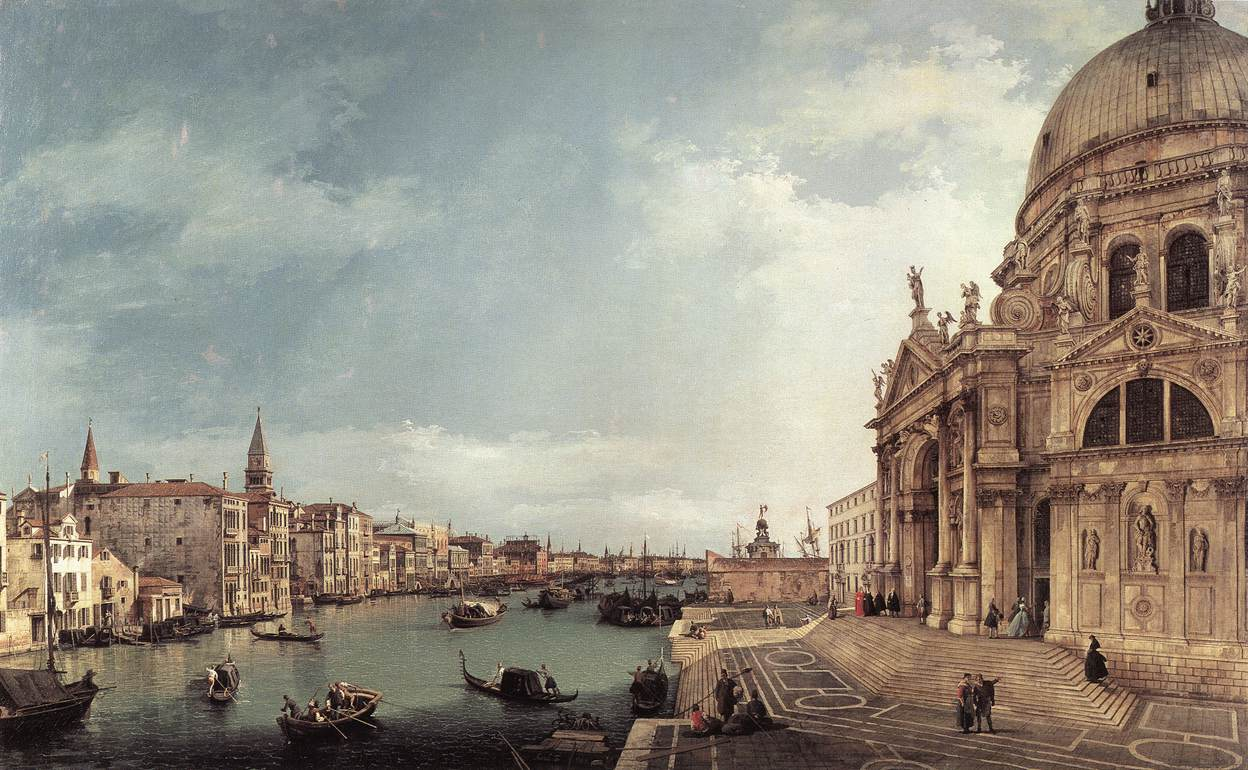
Version in the Royal Collection at Windsor Castle

== See also ==
- List of works by Canaletto
