= Oh the Glory of It All =

Book by Sean Wilsey

- Author: Sean Wilsey
- Cover artist: Non-Format
- Language: English
- Genre: Memoir
- Publisher: Penguin Press
- Publication date: 2005
- Pages: 482
- ISBN: 978-0-143-03691-3
- OCLC: 57069292

Oh the Glory of it All (2005), is a work of non-fiction by Sean Wilsey, published by Penguin Press. A humorous coming-of-age memoir, the book chronicles Wilsey's troubled years growing up in a wealthy and prominent San Francisco family.
