= Sean Wilsey =

American writer

Sean Patrick Wilsey
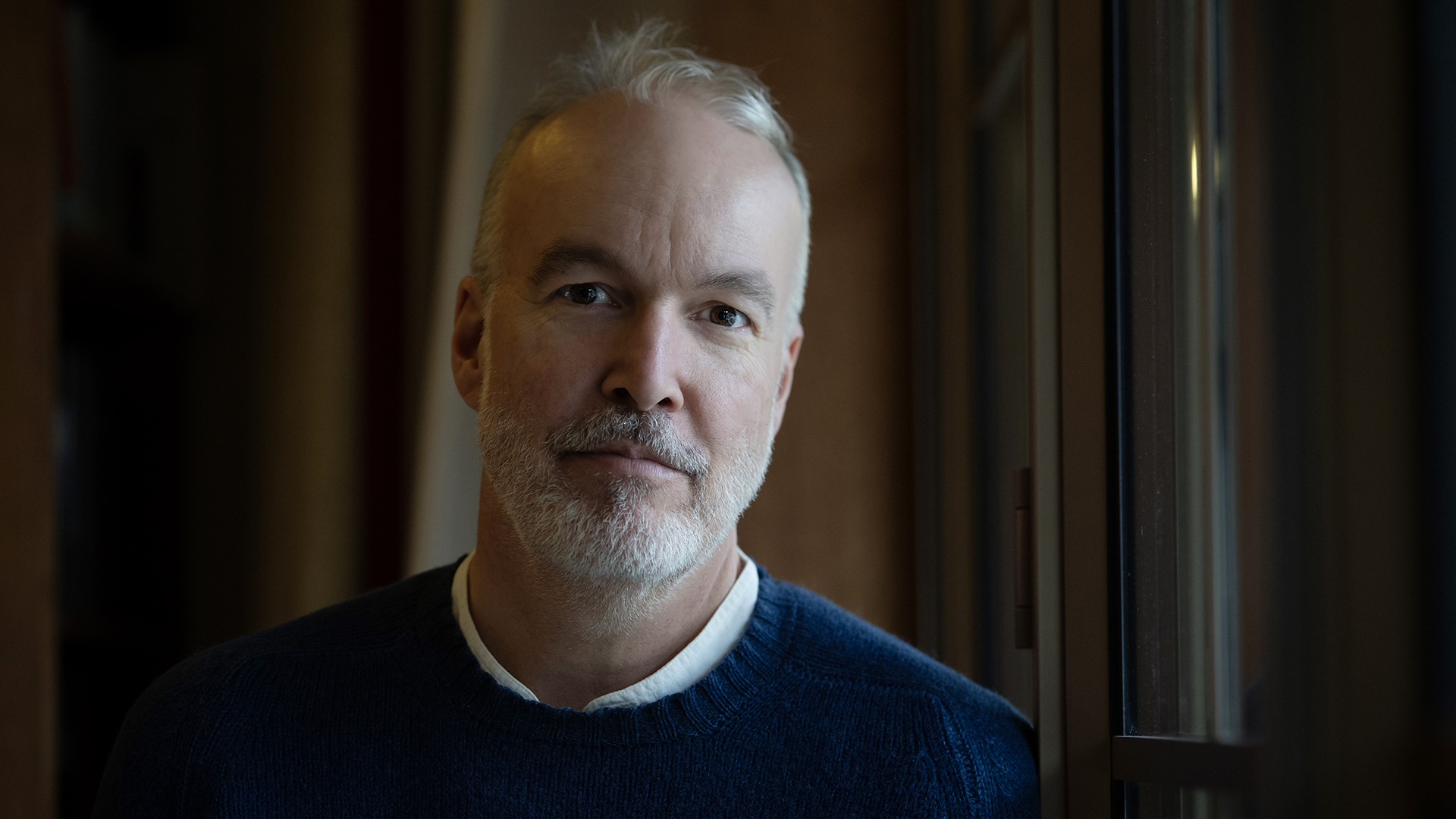
- Born: May 21, 1970 (age 56); San Francisco, California, U.S.
- Education: The New School for Social Research
- Known for: Author and memoirist
- Spouse: Daphne Beal (divorced)
- Mother: Patricia Montandon

Sean Patrick Wilsey (born May 21, 1970) is an American author, filmmaker, and translator. He wrote the memoir Oh the Glory of It All, published by Penguin in 2005.

Born and raised in San Francisco, Wilsey is the son of Al Wilsey, a businessman, and Pat Montandon, a socialite and peace activist. He is the stepson of socialite and philanthropist Dede Wilsey.

Wilsey is a former editor-at-large for McSweeney's Quarterly Concern. His essay collection More Curious was published by McSweeney's in 2014.

== Bibliography ==
=== Books ===
- Oh the Glory of It All (2005)
- The Thinking Fan's Guide to the World Cup (As Editor with Matt Weiland and Franklin Foer, 2006)
- State by State: A Panoramic Portrait of America (As Editor with Matt Weiland, 2008)
- More Curious (2014)
- "Hello, Molly!" (With Molly Shannon, 2022)
- "One, None, and a Hundred Grand" (By Luigi Pirandello, translated from the Italian, 2025)

=== Essays and reporting ===
- "Peace is a Beautiful Thing" (11 April 2005)
- Wilsey, Sean (April 22, 2013). "Open water : among the gondoliers of Venice". Personal History. The New Yorker. Vol. 89, no. 10. pp. 40–47.

=== Film ===
- IX XI (2026)

=== Interviews ===
- "Interview with Sean Wilsey" (16 Sept. 2014)
- "Honest Writing is Funny" (19 Aug. 2014)
