= Joseph S. Farland =

American diplomat (1914–2007)

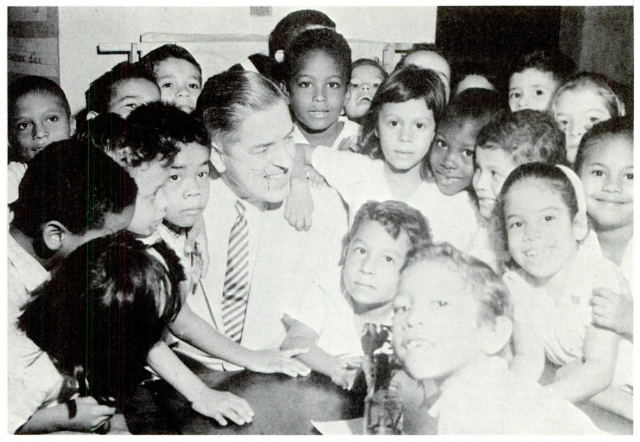
US Ambassador Joseph S. Farland with Panamanian school children

Joseph Simpson Farland (August 11, 1914 – January 28, 2007) served as United States Ambassador to four countries.

Farland was born in Clarksburg, West Virginia and raised in that city as well as in Punxsutawney, Pennsylvania. He received his bachelor's degree and a law degree from West Virginia University and did further studies at Princeton University and Stanford University. Farland was a practicing lawyer for several years.

During World War II Farland worked with the FBI and then was in the Navy. After the war besides continuing his law activities Farland also served as president of coal companies. Farland became United States Ambassador to the Dominican Republic in 1957. He was then appointed Ambassador to Panama in 1960 serving in that post until 1963. In 1963 Farland returned to practicing law in Washington, D.C. Farland later served as United States Ambassador to Pakistan from 1969 to 1972 and then as Ambassador to Iran from 1972 to 1973. During his term as ambassador to Pakistan, Farland arranged for Henry Kissinger to visit China via Pakistan in 1971. Kissinger's clandestine meeting with Zhou Enlai paved the way for President Richard Nixon's own visit to China. Farland was then appointed Ambassador to New Zealand, but did not accept the position and returned to the practice of law. He retired to Winchester, Virginia, where he died on January 28, 2007.

Diplomatic posts
Preceded by William T. Pheiffer	United States Ambassador to the Dominican Republic; August 7, 1957 – May 28, 1960	Succeeded by post abolished
Preceded by Julian F. Harrington	United States Ambassador to Panama; August 29, 1960 – August 31, 1963	Succeeded by post abolished
Preceded by Benjamin H. Oehlert, Jr.	United States Ambassador to Pakistan; November 15, 1969 – April 30, 1972	Succeeded by Henry A. Byroade
Preceded by Douglas MacArthur II	United States Ambassador to Iran; May 21, 1972 – March 10, 1973	Succeeded by Richard Helms
