= John Asher =

American actor and director

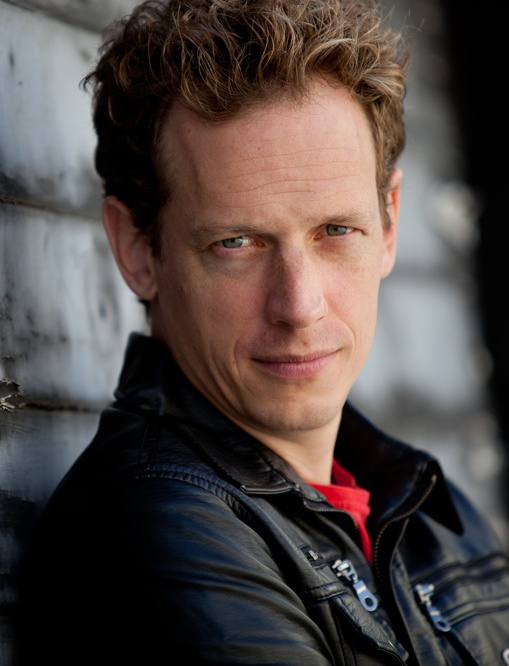
- Asher in 2011
- Born: John Mallory; January 13, 1971 (age 55); United States
- Occupations: Actor, film director, screenwriter
- Years active: 1990–present
- Spouses: Vanessa Lee Asher (m. 1994; div. 1996) Jenny McCarthy (m. 1999; div. 2005)
- Children: 1
- Parent(s): Joyce Bulifant (mother); Edward Mallory (father); William Asher (adoptive father)

John Mallory Asher (born John Mallory; January 13, 1971) is an American actor, film director, and screenwriter. He is perhaps best known for his performance as Gary on the USA Network's series spinoff of the movie Weird Science.

== Early life ==
Asher was born John Mallory to actor Edward Mallory and actress Joyce Bulifant. He was adopted by Bulifant's third husband, producer/director William Asher.

== Personal life ==
Asher married actress Jenny McCarthy on September 11, 1999. Their son Evan Joseph Asher was born on May 18, 2002, and was diagnosed with autism. They divorced in September 2005.

== Filmography ==
=== Actor ===
- Ghost Whisperer as Charlie Hammond
- October Road
  - "Revenge of the Cupcake Kid" (2008), TV episode, as Ronald Buckwild
- CSI: Crime Scene Investigation
  - "The Chick Chop Flick Shop" (2007), TV episode, as Zack Putrid
- NCIS
  - "The Ex-File" (2007), TV episode, as Fred Rinnert
- Las Vegas
  - "You Can't Take It with You" (2004), TV episode, as Calvin 'Doc' Haynes
- Fastlane
  - "Dogtown" (2003), TV episode, as Shane
- Rubbing Charlie (2003), TV, as Dean
- Going to California (2001), TV series, as Insect Bob
- Space Cowboys (2000) as Young Jerry (as John Mallory Asher)
- The New Swiss Family Robinson (1998) as Shane Robinson
- Gun
  - "The Shot" (1997), TV episode, as The Video Rat
- Time Well Spent (1996) (TV) (as John Mallory Asher)
- Weird Science (1994), TV series, as Gary Wallace (as John Mallory Asher)
- Double Dragon (1994) as Smartass Mohawk
- Showdown (1993/I) as Mike
- Step by Step
  - "The Making of the President" (1992), TV episode, as Student
- Frozen Assets (1992) as Bobby Murdock
- Who's the Boss?
  - "Field of Screams" (1991), TV episode, as Usher
- Designing Women
  - "Julia and Rusty, Sittin' in a Tree" (1991), TV episode, as Dennis
- The Haunted (1991) (TV) as Joe
- Married... with Children
  - "You Better Shop Around: Part 1" (1991), TV episode, as Bob
- Beverly Hills, 90210
  - "Class of Beverly Hills" (1990), TV episode, as Guy in Hall

=== Director ===
- I Hate Kids (2019)
- A Boy Called Po (2016)
- Tooken (2015)
- Somebody Marry Me (2013)
- One Tree Hill (as John Asher)
  - "Who Will Survive, and What Will Be Left of Them" (2006) TV Episode
  - "Brave New World" (2006) TV Episode
  - "The Worst Day Since Yesterday" (2005) TV Episode
  - "The Trick Is to Keep Breathing" (2004) TV Episode
- Thank Heaven (2006)
- Dirty Love (2005) (as John Asher)
- The Policy (2003/II) (as John Asher)
- Going to California (2001) TV Series
- Diamonds (1999)
- Chick Flick (1998)
- Kounterfeit (1996) (as John Mallory Asher)

=== Producer ===
- Somebody Marry Me (2013)
- Dirty Love (2005) (as John Mallory Asher)

=== Cinematographer ===
- Mating Rituals 101 (2004)

=== Writer ===
- Tooken (2015)
- Chick Flick (1998)
