= Geraldine Traina =

American feminist (1936–2011)

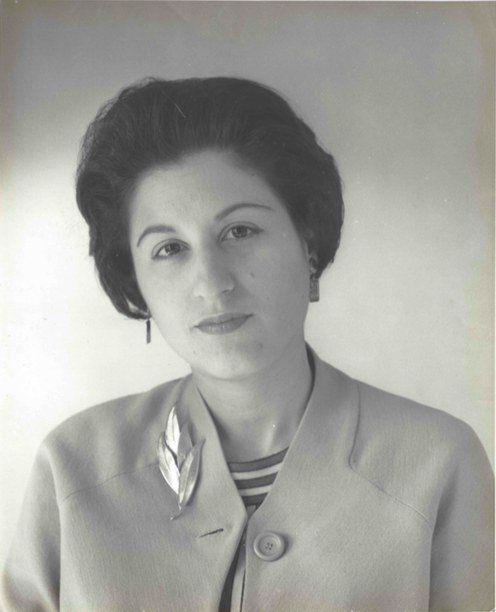
- As a young woman in 1956
- Born: 27 June 1936; Brooklyn, New York, US
- Died: 28 April 2011 (aged 74); Port Charlotte, Florida, US
- Occupations: Feminist, social worker

Geraldine Traina (June 27, 1936 – April 28, 2011), also known as Gerri Traina, was an American feminist. She co-founded and edited Quest: A Feminist Quarterly, ran the Washington Area Women's Center in 1973, and helped to establish the Washington Area Women's Fund and the Washington Area Feminist Federal Credit Union. She appears in Feminists Who Changed America, 1963–1975 by Barbara J. Love.

== Biography ==
=== Early life and education ===
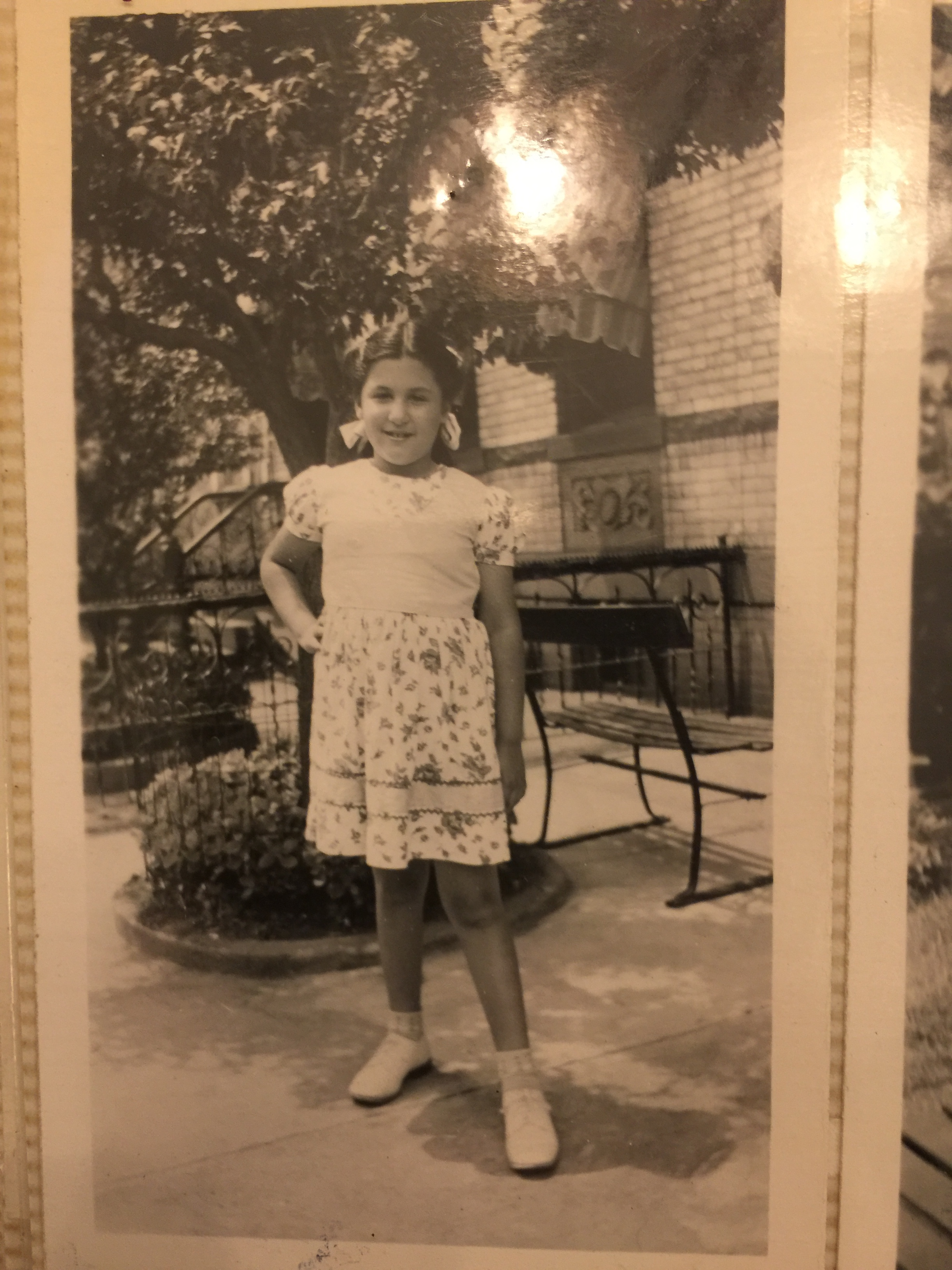
Gerri Traina as a child

Geraldine Traina was born to Peter Traina, a postal examiner, and Marie Catalano, a seamstress in Brooklyn, New York. She received her B.A from Hunter College in New York City and her M.A. from NYU.

Traina was one of the first Peace Corps volunteers, serving in the Philippines in 1962.

=== Career ===
Geraldine Traina discovered the women's movement in the 1960s, attending consciousness raising groups in New York City with anti-Vietnam war activists. As an adult, she moved to Washington, D.C. where she founded and ran the Washington Area Women's Center, which housed courses in home and auto repair, a rape crisis center, a legal defence fund, abortion counselling, therapy, and health classes for women. In the 1980s, she founded the Washington Area Feminist Federal Credit Union and the Washington Area Women's Fund, where she eventually served as executive director, to give women access to loans. She was co-director of the D.C. chapter of the National Congress of Neighborhood Women.

She came out as a lesbian in 1971, at the age of 35.

=== Death ===
Geraldine Traina died of ovarian cancer on April 28, 2011 in Port Charlotte, Florida.

== Political views ==
Geraldine Traina was a radical feminist and supported women's, environmental, anti-nuclear, and anti-imperialist causes.

== See also ==
- Second-wave feminism
- Feminist businesses
