= Patricia Montandon =

American writer and socialite (1928–2025)

- Born: December 26, 1928; Texas, U.S.
- Died: December 21, 2025 (aged 96); Palm Desert, California, U.S.
- Spouses: Howard Groves (divorced) Edward Wise Jr. (divorced) Melvin Belli (divorced) Alfred Wilsey (divorced)
- Children: Sean Wilsey

Patricia Montandon (December 26, 1928 – December 21, 2025) was an American author, philanthropist, activist and self-made socialite.

== Early life ==
Pat Montandon was born in Texas on December 26, 1928, to Myrtle Taylor and Charles Clay Montandon, an itinerant minister of the Nazarene Church. (Note: The manuscript version of her birth certificate can be read Patsy Sue or Patsy Lue but the typescript version is Patsy Lue.) Montandon grew up in Oklahoma during the Great Depression. She lived in San Francisco in the 1960s, where she became known for her talent for hosting memorable parties and for her relationship with Frank Sinatra.

== Roundtable luncheons ==
In the 1970s, Montandon began hosting roundtable luncheons that included controversial talking points. These gatherings featured a range of celebrities, including Andy Warhol, Danielle Steel, Joan Baez, Eldridge Cleaver, and Frank Sinatra. Her luncheons continued after her move to Beverly Hills in the 2000s.

== Career ==
Upon moving to San Francisco, Montandon worked during summer, managing a Joseph Magnin clothing store. She later hosted a TV show and became a newspaper columnist for the San Francisco Examiner.

In 1979, Montandon conceived the idea of the Napa Valley Wine Auction. She lent her idea to Napa Valley vintners, with her portion of the proceeds benefiting two Napa Valley hospitals.

Montandon wrote numerous nonfiction books, including The New York Times bestseller How to Be a Party Girl, The Intruders, Whispers from God: A Life Beyond Imaginings, and Oh the Hell of it All. Other books include Celebrities and Their Angels and Making Friends, the true story of two 11-year-old girls, Katya from Moscow and Star from San Francisco. Her memoir Peeing on Hot Coals was released in 2014.

=== Humanitarian work ===
Montandon was an advocate for women's rights. In 1970, she founded The Name Choice Center to advocate for women's legal right to retain their surnames after marriage.

In 1982, Montandon founded a peace group called Children as Teachers for Peace (later renamed Children as the Peacemakers) and made 37 international trips with grade-school children. She met with 26 world leaders, including China's Premier Zhao Ziyang, Chancellor Helmut Kohl, Pope John Paul II, Indira Gandhi, Prime Minister Gro Harlem Brundtland of Norway, former Soviet President Mikhail Gorbachev, and Mother Teresa. She collected letters by schoolchildren urging an end to nuclear proliferation, and delivered food and supplies to children in Russia and Ethiopia.

In 1987, Montandon designed the Banner of Hope. Now a mile long, it is a memorial inscribed with the names and ages of children killed in war. The banner was first exhibited in the Kremlin at an International Women's Congress.

In 2018, Montandon renamed her organization Peace To The Planet. The organization aims to give children a platform to advocate against gun violence and global warming. Peace To The Planet is completing a new banner, similar to the Banner of Hope, showing the faces and names of children killed by gun violence.

== Personal life and death ==
Montandon was married four times. Her first marriage, to Howard Groves in 1947, lasted 12 years. Her second, to Edward Wise Jr., took place in December 1960 but soon ended. After that, Montandon reverted to her maiden name. In the 1960s, she had a short-lived marriage to attorney Melvin Belli.

In 1969, Montandon married butter baron and billionaire Alfred Wilsey, and the next year she had her only child, Sean Wilsey, who became a best-selling author. As a society wife, she "acquired a reputation for giving the best parties and round-table luncheons." Al Wilsey later had an affair with Montandon's married best friend, Dede Traina (born Diane Dow Buchanan), before filing for divorce in 1980 in order to marry Dede. The divorce proceedings played out publicly.

In 1975, Montandon won a lawsuit against Triangle Publications for damaging her reputation.

Montandon died on December 21, 2025, at the age of 96, at her home in Palm Desert.

== Awards and honors ==
Montandon was nominated for a Nobel Peace Prize three successive years and received the UN Peace Messenger award in 1987.

In 2014, Jitu Rajgor founded a women's health facility in Montandon's honor at his clinic in Ahmedabad, India.

== In popular culture ==
Author Armistead Maupin caricatured her as society columnist "Prue Giroux" in his Tales of the City series.

== Published works ==
- How to Be A Party Girl, McGraw-Hill, 1968.
- The Intruders, 1975.
- Making Friends
- Celebrities And Their Angels
- Oh the Hell of it All, Harper, 2007.
- Whispers from God: A Life Beyond Imaginings, Harper Paperbacks, 2008.
- Peeing On Hot Coals
- Recipes for Conversation: A Guide to Hosting Authentic Conversations in the Digital Age (and a Pandemic)

== See also ==
- Dede Wilsey
