= Trevor Traina =

American entrepreneur and ambassador (born 1968)

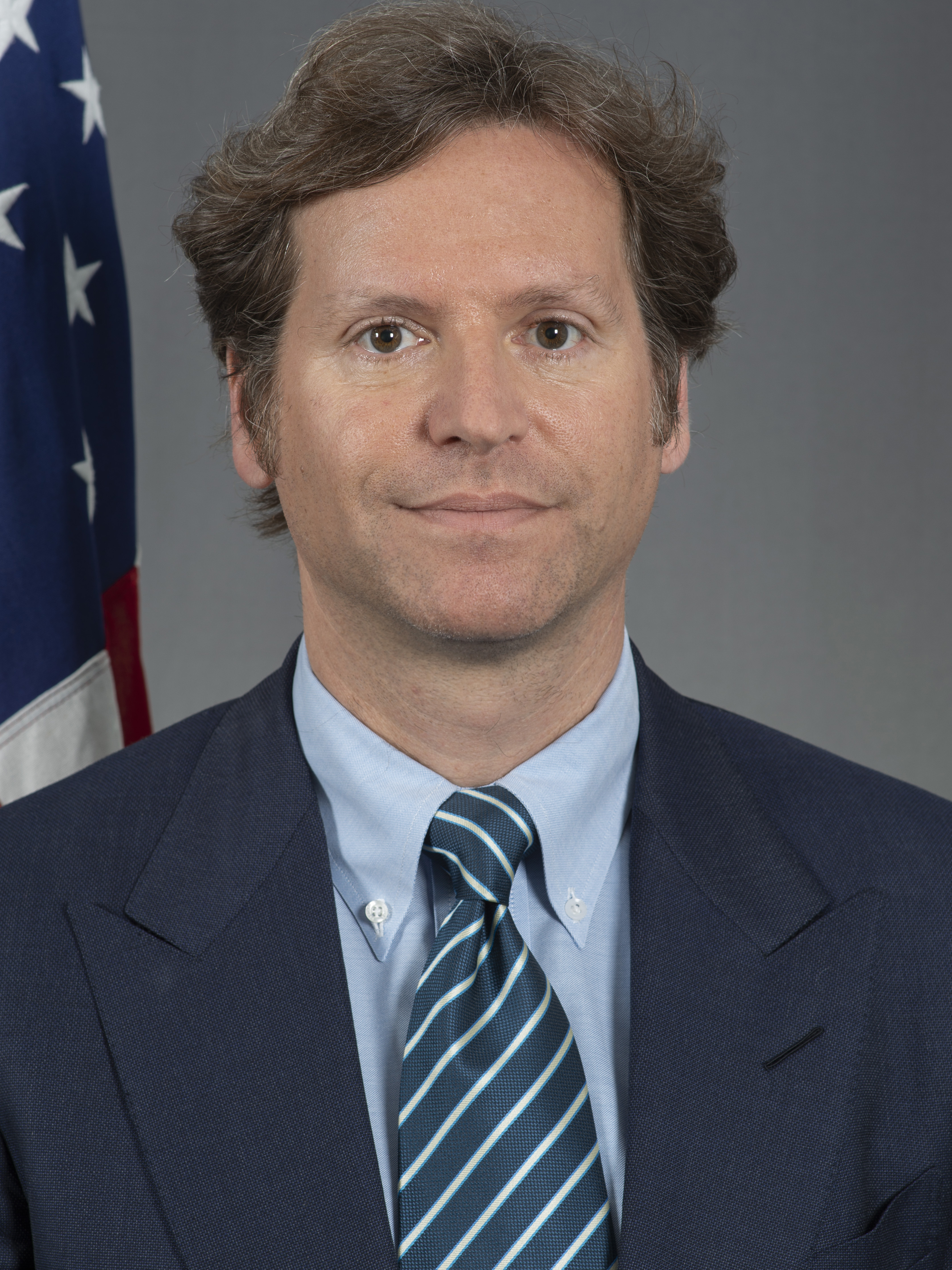

United States Ambassador to Austria
- In office May 24, 2018 – January 20, 2021
- President: Donald Trump
- Preceded by: Alexa L. Wesner
- Succeeded by: Victoria Reggie Kennedy

Personal details
- Born: 1968 (age 57–58) San Francisco, California, U.S.
- Spouse: Alexis Swanson
- Children: 2
- Parent(s): Diane Buchanan Wilsey; John Traina
- Relatives: Herbert Henry Dow (great-great-grandfather); Wiley T. Buchanan Jr. (grandfather); Todd Traina (brother); Danielle Steel (ex-stepmother); Nick Traina (adopted stepbrother)
- Education: Princeton University (BA); University of Oxford; Haas School of Business (MBA)
- Occupation: Businessman

Trevor Dow Traina (born 1968) is an American businessman and diplomat who served as the United States ambassador to Austria from 2018 to 2021 and Vice Chair of the Presidio of San Francisco since 2026

== Early life ==
Traina was born in San Francisco, California to Diane Buchanan Wilsey and John Traina in 1968. His father was a shipping and cruise executive and Napa Valley vintner and art collector. His parents divorced when he was 12. He has a younger brother Todd, and five younger half-siblings through his father's marriage to Danielle Steel. He was also brother to Steel's son Nick Traina, who was adopted and given the family name by his father. His maternal grandfather Wiley T. Buchanan Jr. was U.S. ambassador to Austria from 1975 to 1977.

Traina attended the Cathedral School for Boys in San Francisco and later graduated from Princeton University with a Bachelor of Arts in politics in 1990. He later studied at the University of Oxford and has Master of Business Administration from the Haas School of Business.

== Career ==
Traina started his career as brand manager at Seagram's. As an entrepreneur, he was involved in the creation of CompareNet, which was bought by Microsoft in 1999. In total he founded or co-founded five technology startups which were all sold. The most recent was IfOnly which was sold to MasterCard in August 2020.

Traina was an honorary advisor to the Fine Arts Museum of San Francisco as well as the Haas School of Business, the Princeton University Art Museum and other institutions.

=== U.S. ambassador to Austria ===
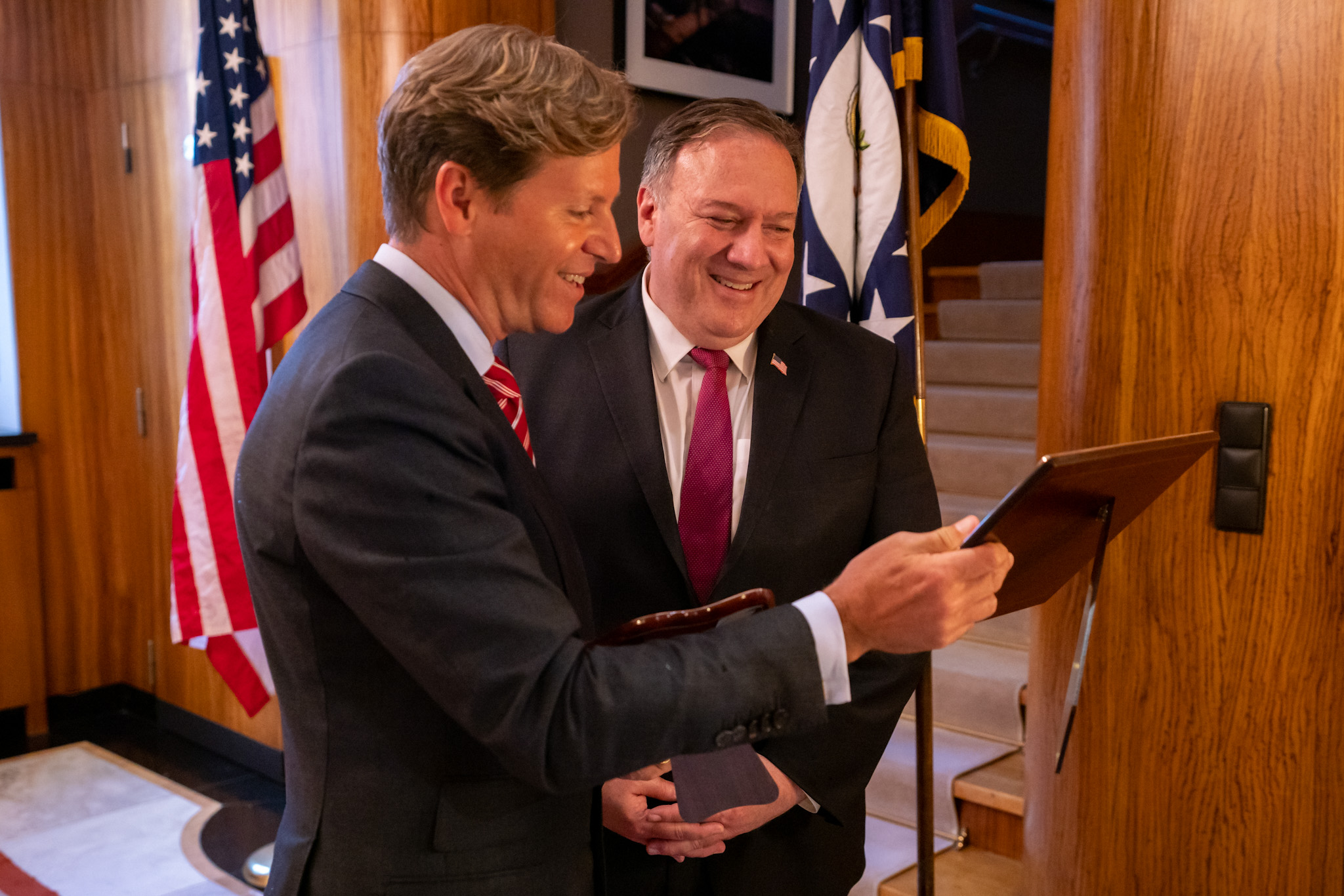
Traina attends a dinner with Secretary of State Michael R. Pompeo in Vienna, Austria on August 13, 2020.

On January 23, 2018, President Donald Trump nominated Traina as Ambassador to Austria. The U.S. Senate unanimously confirmed Traina's nomination on March 22, 2018.

Traina risked controversy for supporting the LGBTQ community by flying a rainbow flag at the Embassy during Vienna Pride despite a ban from the State Department on doing so. Traina is quoted as having arranged the most high level meetings between Austria and the US in history and bringing about an era of Verbundenheit or "new closeness" between the two countries that had not before been seen.

He is also a noted public speaker, having spoken to the Harvard Republican Club in November 2024.

== Awards ==
The Secretary of Defense awarded the Office of the Secretary of Defense Medal for Exceptional Public Service to Traina in January 2021. The Chancellor of Austria awarded Traina the Austrian Grand Declaration of Honor in Gold in January 2021. Traina has been awarded over two dozen patents from the USPTO.

== Personal life ==
Traina is married to Alexis Swanson Traina. He and his wife have two children Johnny and Delphina. His hobby is collecting photographs, an exhibition of his collection in summer 2012 at the Fine Arts Museum was discussed in the media. Traina made a major loan of photographs to the Albertina museum in Vienna for the Fall 2021 exhibition American Photography.

Diplomatic posts
Preceded by Alexa L. Wesner	United States Ambassador to Austria; 2018–2021	Succeeded by Victoria Reggie Kennedy
