= Todd Traina =

American film producer

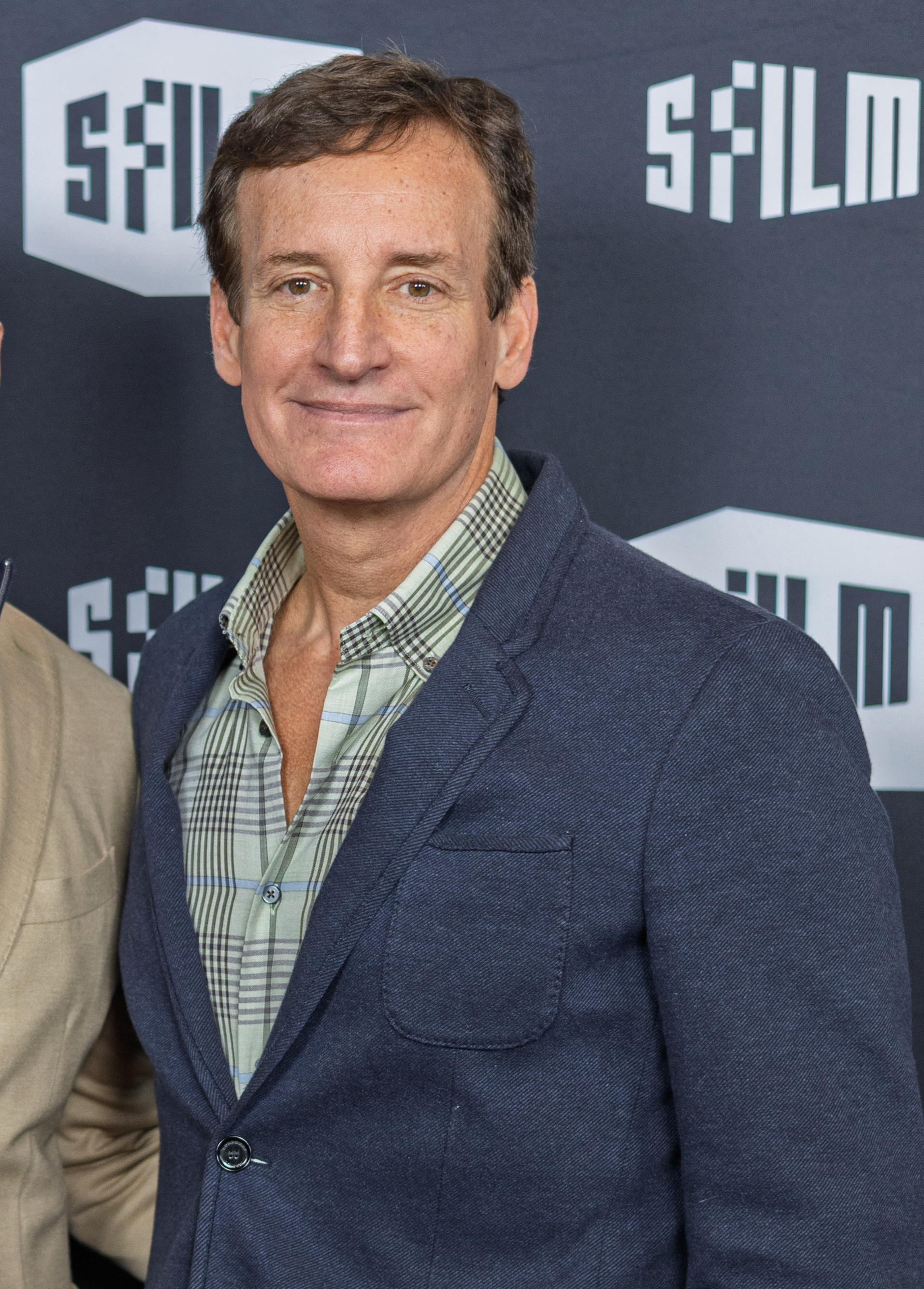
- Todd Traina in 2026
- Born: 1969 (age 56–57); San Francisco, California, U.S.
- Education: Connecticut College
- Occupations: Film producer; Musician
- Years active: 1991–present
- Organization(s): Traina Productions, Red Rover Films
- Spouse: Katie Traina (m. 2003)
- Children: 1
- Parents: John Traina (father); Dede Wilsey (mother)
- Relatives: Trevor Traina (brother), Danielle Steel (former stepmother)

Todd Traina (born 1969) is an American film producer and the founder of Red Rover Films in 2007. In 2007, Traina was named by Daily Variety as one of its "10 Producers to Watch". He is currently serving as the Board President of SFFiLM, a nonprofit that runs the San Francisco International Film Festival; he was named to the board in 2009.

== Personal life ==
He was born in 1969 in San Francisco, California, to shipping executive and art collector John Traina and Dede Wilsey, a San Francisco philanthropist and businesswoman who serves as Chairman of the Fine Arts Museums of San Francisco. Traina wanted to attend an East Coast school, and with its liberal arts curriculum and family connection, he attended Connecticut College and graduated with a degree in Government. He is the younger brother of Trevor Traina, and his former stepmother is novelist Danielle Steel.

Traina married Katie Traina in 2003. The couple has one daughter and resides in San Francisco.

== Film career ==
Fresh from college, Traina began his career in the film industry in 1991 as a production assistant on television movie-of-the-week adaptations of his stepmother's novels. He turned independent producer two years later. His first complete film was Stanley's Gig, which he sold to the Starz Network and released in 2000.

Traina has compared being a producer to being a wedding planner and "the father of the bride in a wedding that lasts a whole year".

Over his more than 30-year career, Traina has produced over 25 feature films, many of which have played at prominent international film festivals including Cannes, Sundance, Berlin, Toronto, SXSW, and others.

Through his production company, Traina Productions, he produced One Stupid Thing directed by Linda Yellen. He also served as Executive Producer on Edge of Everything, which debuted at the Munich Film Festival, and on Sasquatch Sunset, starring Riley Keough and Jesse Eisenberg, which premiered at the Sundance Film Festival in 2024. Traina was also Executive Producer on War Pony, directed by Keough and Gina Gammell, which won the Caméra d'Or at the 2022 Cannes Film Festival and premiered in the US in 2023.

Traina co-wrote and produced the feature comedy I Hate Kids and served as producer on Sian Heder's directorial debut Tallulah, which premiered at Sundance and was later acquired by Netflix.

In addition to his work in feature films, Traina served as Executive Producer on the episodic mockumentary series Dope State. Apart from his career in the film industry, Traina is also a musician, having played drums in various bands. He has served on the board of the International Tennis Hall of Fame and on the Vision of Hope board, which supports providing private education to underprivileged youth.

== Filmography ==
Traina has served as producer, co-producer, or executive producer on the following films:

- Sasquatch Sunset (2024)
- Edge of Everything (2023)
- Rally (2023)
- War Pony (2022)
- 10 Things We Should Do Before We Break Up (2020)
- Dope State (2019)
- I Hate Kids (2019)
- Don't Leave Home (2018)
- Wiener Dog Internationals (2016)
- Tallulah (2016)
- Ten Thousand Saints (2015)
- What Maisie Knew (2012)
- Goats (2012)
- Another Happy Day (2011)
- Morning (2010)
- The Romantics (2010)
- Black Water Transit (2009)
- Blood and Bone (2009)
- My Suicide (2009)
- Stag Night (2008)
- Timber Falls (2007)
- What We Do Is Secret (2007)
- Punk's Not Dead (2007)
- Grace is Gone (2007)
- Skeleton Woman (2000)
- Stanley's Gig (2000)
- Life Sold Separately (1997)

Television film

- Heartbeat (1993)
- Secrets (1992)
- Danielle Steel's 'Palomino' (1991)

As actor

- I Hate Kids (2019)
- White Power (2001)

== Awards ==
Todd Traina's work has been recognized at various film festivals and award events. Another Happy Day (2011), directed and written by Sam Levinson, won the Waldo Salt Screenwriting Award. At the 2011 Sundance Film Festival, Grace is Gone, received the Audience Award for Best Drama. In 2016, Tallulah, was nominated for the Grand Jury Prize at Sundance. War Pony, which premiered at the 2022 Cannes Film Festival, won the Caméra d'Or for Best First Feature. In 2022, Edge of Everything, won the Panavision Spirit Award for Independent Cinema. Additionally, TransMexico, Edge of Everything, and Andragogy were among the winners at the 2024 Santa Barbara International Film Festival. My Suicide, a low-budget dark comedy released in 2009 which Traina produced, won a Crystal Bear at the 2009 Berlin Film Festival, among other prizes.
