= Maka =

Maka or MAKA may refer to:

== Culture, languages, and people ==
- Maká, a Native American people in Paraguay
  - Maká language, spoken by the Maká
- Maka (name), including a list of people and fictional characters
- Maka people, of Cameroon
  - Makaa language, of Cameroon
- Maka, the ISO 15924 code for the Makasar script

== Places ==
- Maka (satrapy), a province of the Achaemenid Empire
- Maka, Biffeche, capital of the kingdom of Biffeche in pre-colonial Senegal
- Maka village, in Pakistan

== Other uses ==
- Maka (TV series), Philippine television youth drama series
- Tropical Storm Maka, a 2009 Pacific Ocean tropical cyclone

== See also ==
- Maca (disambiguation)
- Makaa (disambiguation)
- Makka (disambiguation)
- Maka-Maka
- Macca
