= Mecha (disambiguation) =

Mecha refers to scientific ideas or science-fiction genres that center on robots or machines controlled by people.

Mecha may also refer to:

== Arts and entertainment ==
- Mecha anime and manga
- Mecha, a robot in Catalyst: Agents of Change comics
- Mecha Kirby, a copy ability from the Kirby series introduced in Kirby's Return to Dream Land Deluxe

== Places ==
- Mecha (selo), a rural locality in Osintsevskoye Rural Settlement, Kishertsky District, Perm Krai, Russia
- Mecha (woreda), a district of the Amhara Region, Ethiopia

== Other uses ==
- MEChA (Movimiento Estudiantil Chicano de Aztlán), a US-based student organization
- Mecha Ortiz (1900–1987), Argentine actress
- Mecha tea, a type of Japanese green tea

== See also ==
- Meca (disambiguation)
- Mecca (disambiguation)
