= Mecca (disambiguation) =

Mecca (Makkah al-Mukarramah) is a city in Saudi Arabia and the holiest site in Islam.

Mecca or Makkah may also refer to:

== Geography ==
- Makkah Province, Saudi Arabia, the province surrounding the city
- Mecca, California, a town in Riverside County, California, United States
- Mecca, Indiana, a town in Parke County, Indiana, United States
- Mecca, Missouri, an unincorporated community
- Mecca, Ohio, an unincorporated community
- Mecca Township, Trumbull County, Ohio, United States

== Brands ==
- Mecca (cosmetics), an Australian cosmetics retailer
- Mecca-Cola, a cola-flavoured carbonated beverage
- Mecca Ointment, a first aid ointment, available in drug stores across Canada
- Mecca Leisure Group, a UK entertainment business
  - Mecca Bingo, a UK-based social and bingo club leisure company formerly part of Mecca Leisure, now owned by Rank Group
  - Mecca Dance Hall Tottenham, a former entertainment venue in Tottenham, London
- Milwaukee Exposition Convention Center and Arena, since renamed UW–Milwaukee Panther Arena

== Entertainment ==
- Mecca (Power character)
- "Mecca" (song), a 1963 hit single by Gene Pitney
- "Mecca", a song by EarthGang and JID from the 2020 album Spilligion
- Mecca, a 1996 album by the Memphis Pilgrims, a rock group led by Michael Falzarano
- Mecca, a 2009 album by Persia White

== People ==
- Mecca Jamilah Sullivan, American author and professor

== Other ==
- Black mecca, a term in the United States for a city to which black people are attracted

== See also ==
- Macca (disambiguation)
- Meca (disambiguation)
- Makah (disambiguation)
- Makka (disambiguation)
- Mecha, piloted or remote-controlled vehicles in certain subgenres of science fiction
- MEChA, an organisation of Chicano students in the United States
- Meccano, a metal construction kit toy
- Mekka, one of the earlier aliases of DJ Jake Williams
