= Black mecca =

Colloquialism for a location featuring high or potential Black economic prosperity

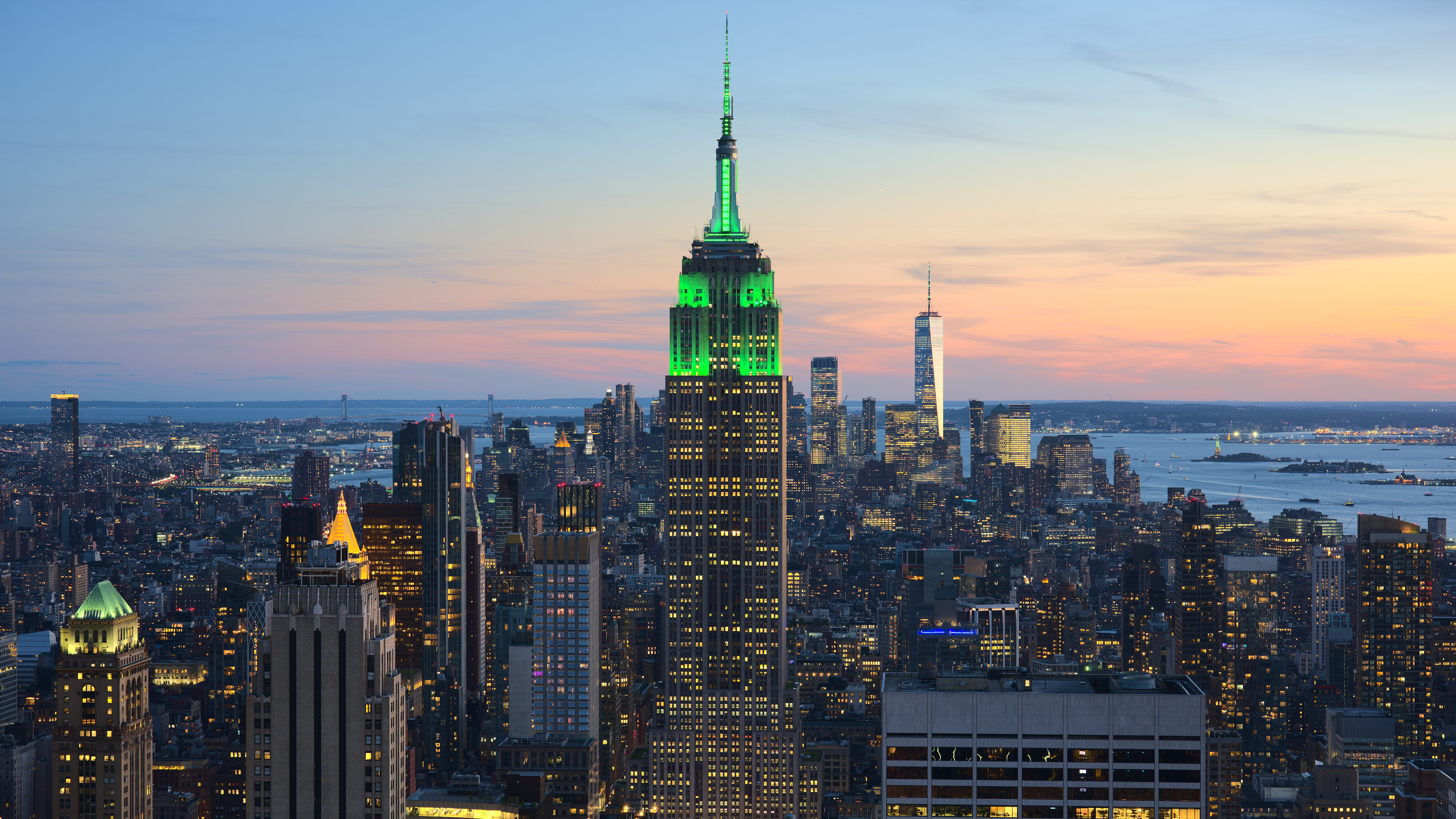
New York City was considered the first Black mecca

A black mecca, in the United States, is a city to which African Americans, particularly singles, professionals, and middle-class families, are drawn to live, due to some or all of the following factors:

- superior economic opportunities for black people, often as assessed by the presence of a large black upper-middle and upper class
- black businesses and political activism in a city
- leading black educational institutions in a city
- a city's leading role in black history, arts, music, food, and other cultures
- harmonious black-white race relations in a city

New York City, in particular Harlem, was referred to as a black mecca during the Harlem Renaissance of the 1920s, 1930s, 1940s and still is as of today. Atlanta has also adopted the name and has been referred to as a black mecca since the 1970s, while Black Enterprise has referred to Houston as the emerging equivalent.

== Atlanta ==
1971 Ebony magazine portraying Atlanta as a Black Mecca

Atlanta has been widely noted as a black mecca since the 1970s.

In 1971, Ebony magazine called Atlanta the "black mecca of the South", because "black folks have more, live better, accomplish more and deal with whites more effectively than they do anywhere else in the South—or North". Ebony illustrated as evidence of "mecca" status Atlanta's high black home ownership, the Atlanta University Center (the nation's largest consortium of historically black colleges (HBCUs)), Atlanta's civil rights heritage, black business ownership, black-owned restaurants, the civic leadership of the black clergy, black fraternal organizations, and black political power in City Hall, while it also acknowledged the poverty which a large percentage of Atlanta's black population endured.

In 1974, Atlanta became the first major southern city to elect a Black mayor. Since 1974, every Atlanta mayor has been Black and mostly graduates of HBCUs.

In 1983, Atlanta magazine said that Atlanta's reputation as a black mecca was "deserved because it is true" because "the metro area now has the highest proportion of middle-income African-Americans of any city in the country".

A 1997 Ebony magazine article illustrated Atlanta's status as "the new mecca" (and the "land of milk and honey" for blacks) because a poll of the magazine's 100 most influential African Americans voted Atlanta overall the best city for blacks, possessed the most employment opportunities for blacks, it was American's "most diverse city", and was the city with the best schools and most affordable housing for blacks. A 2002 article in the same magazine reconfirmed Atlanta as "the new black mecca" and "the go-to city for blacks."

In 2009, the Associated Press characterized Atlanta's status as a black mecca by black political power in its City Hall.

A 2015 report showed that the Atlanta area had the greatest numerical gain in new black residents than any metropolitan area in the U.S., according to an analysis of census data.

In 2018, Forbes magazine ranked Atlanta tied for the #1 city in the U.S. (along with the Washington, D.C. area) for where African-Americans are doing the best economically.

In 2019, USA Today named Atlanta the nation's black tech capital. Atlanta attracts the most black professionals in the tech industry.

=== Historically Black colleges in Atlanta ===
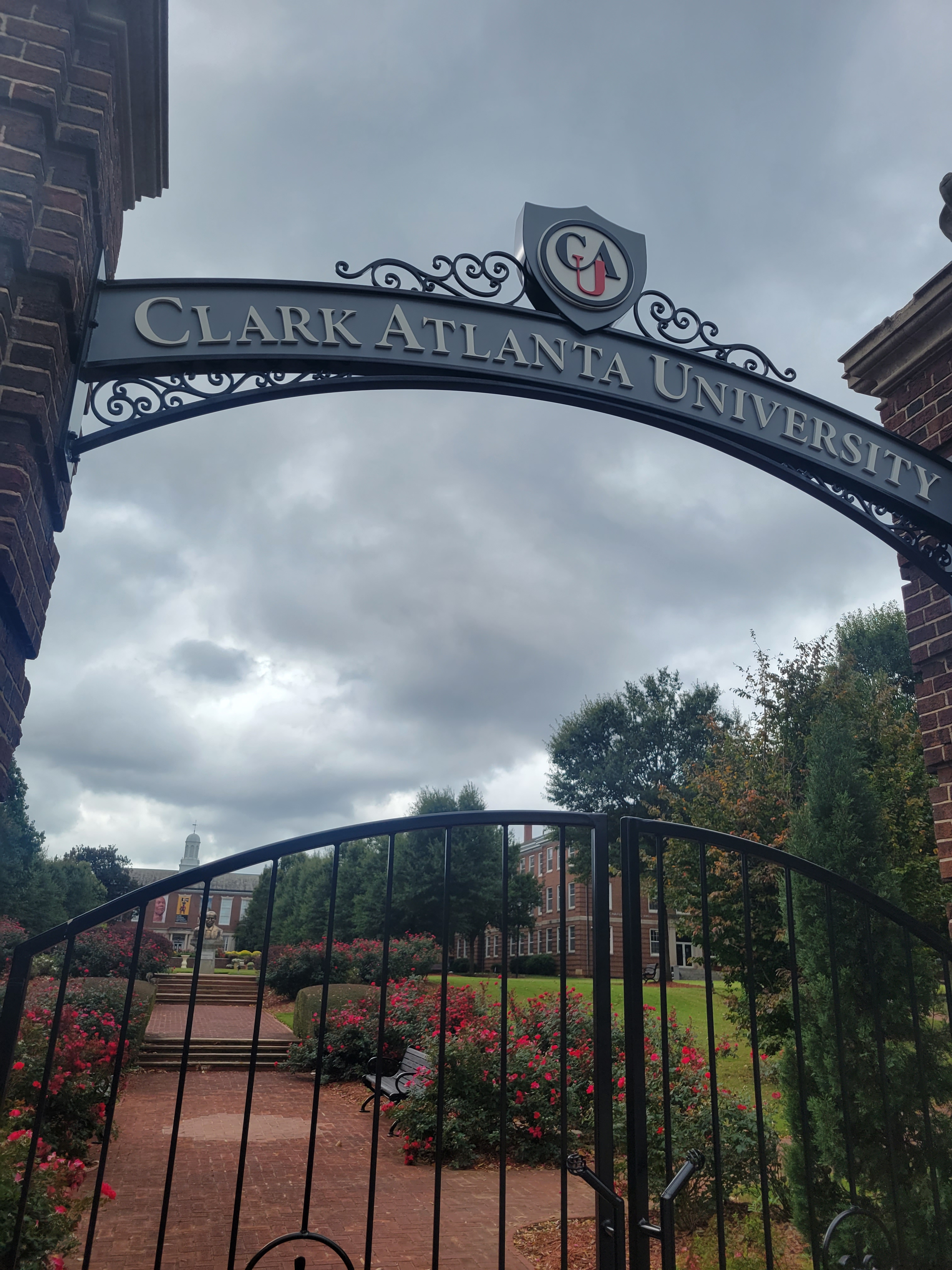
Clark Atlanta University in Atlanta

Atlanta is home of the oldest and largest consortium of historically black institutions in the nation. The Atlanta University Center consists of Clark Atlanta University, Spelman College, Morehouse College and the Morehouse School of Medicine. The consortium structure allows for students to cross-register at the other institutions in order to attain a broader collegiate experience.

The first college founded by African-Americans in Georgia, Morris Brown College, is based in Atlanta.

The Atlanta Student Movement was an organization formed in the 1960s by students enrolled in Atlanta's historically black colleges that focused on dismantling systemic racism and oppression of African-Americans. Their courageous efforts led to fairer treatment and better opportunities for African-Americans in the Atlanta area.

=== Black educational attainment ===
According to a 2018 study, 30.7% of African-Americans in the Atlanta metro area have earned at least a bachelor's degree which is above the national average of 21.8% for black Americans.

=== Black entertainment mecca ===
In 2011 in a New York Times article with the short title "Atlanta Emerges as a Black Entertainment Mecca", comedian Cedric the Entertainer, who hosted that year's Soul Train Music Awards, said Atlanta had always been a black mecca and continues to be one, with respect to the black musical talent in the city.

In 2019, Tyler Perry opened the 330-acre Tyler Perry Studios which is the largest film production studio in the nation and the first major film production studio owned by an African-American.

=== Black entrepreneurship ===
According to a 2015 study by NerdWallet, the Atlanta area is home to about 2.1 million black owned businesses, the highest in the nation.

Established in 2005, the Atlanta Black Chamber of Commerce is dedicated to supporting and connecting black entrepreneurs in the Atlanta area. Established in 2019, Atlanta's Russell Center for Innovation & Entrepreneurship is America's largest center dedicated to empowering black entrepreneurs and small businesses.

=== Black homeownership ===
In February 2023, the Atlanta area's Black homeownership rate of 53% was above the U.S. Black homeownership average rate of 45%. The Atlanta area's Black homeownership rate jumped five percentage points during the worst months of the COVID pandemic when mortgage interest rates were at or near historic lows and student loans were paused. The Black homeownership rate in the Atlanta area increased more than any other race in the same area between 2020 and 2022.

=== Mecca for Black LGBT people ===
In 2005, The New York Times reported that Atlanta had become a mecca for openly Black LGBT people, noting that within the African-American community in the U.S., in which some consider being gay was slightly less accepted than in society as a whole, Atlanta formed a reputation for being a place inclusive to openly LGBT people with its "too busy to hate" mantra. Atlanta is also widely noted for its annual Atlanta Black Pride celebration. An earlier 2004 article in the Atlanta Journal-Constitution also documented Atlanta as a "hub" or "mecca" for black gays.

=== Criticism ===
Atlanta's status as a "mecca" for blacks has always been questioned, or the concept of a "mecca" refuted altogether, due to the endemic high levels of black poverty that exist alongside black success. In 1997 the Chicago Tribune published an article titled "Atlanta's image as a black mecca losing luster". The loss in "luster" was because of a reality that too many blacks weren't coming close to financial success, but rather "caught up in a vicious cycle of poverty, crime and homelessness". The city had among the highest crime rates in the nation coupled with low performing predominately black public schools. Black city leaders were unable to solve or improve problems plaguing the Black community in the city.

As of 2020, Blacks are the fastest declining racial group within the city limits of Atlanta. The African-American population went from 67% in 1980 to 47% in 2020. For the first time in decades, the city is no longer majority Black and the rate of new Black residents in the city is significantly lower than in years past. Since the 1990s, the fastest growth of African-Americans in Georgia have been in suburban cities around Atlanta.

As of 2020, with about 1,500 people newly diagnosed with HIV/AIDS in the Atlanta area each year, it ranks among the highest rates in the world. The high rate is comparable to African countries. Black residents make up the majority (~75%) of new infections each year in the area.

Despite Atlanta Public Schools (APS) having several decades of majority Black leadership and a spending per student amount about double the Georgia school district average, a 2020 study showed that Black APS students have one of the nation's worst academic achievement gaps when compared to their White APS peers.

In 2022, the Atlanta Journal Constitution published an article stating Atlanta has the highest income gap in the U.S. between Black and White residents. According to the article, within Atlanta's city limits the median income for a Black family was $28,000 and $84,000 for a White family. The Black family median income is the lowest in the city, falling behind Latino and Asian families as well.

In 2023, Axios published an article that explained despite the early 2020s rare jump in Black homeownership in the Atlanta area, the Black homeownership rate is still about 25 percentage points below Whites in the same area, about 13 percentage points below the national average, and below all racial groups in the Atlanta area. Also the black homeownership rate within the city limits of Atlanta is 33% which is notably lower than the Atlanta area rate. In 2021, Atlanta had the 5th highest mortgage delinquency rate in the nation, the majority involving Black homeowners.

Also in 2023, the Atlanta Journal Constitution published an article stating only 7.4% of the registered business in the Atlanta area were Black-owned. Although the percentage is the highest in the nation for any U.S. metropolitan area, it is still considered low in comparison to the Atlanta area's Black population (34% as of 2020).

In March 2025, a Black Atlanta native and journalist with the Atlanta Journal-Constitution launched a 10-month content series critically examining Atlanta's reputation as a Black mecca. The series presented perspectives from both sides of the debate—exploring arguments supporting and questioning the city's status as a Black mecca. In the journalist's conclusion, he stated he is neutral on the belief that Atlanta is a Black mecca.

According to a 2025 homelessness census, 80% of the homeless population in the Atlanta area identify as Black. Blacks are heavily overrepresented in homelessness. Black homelessness in the Atlanta area has seen notable increases since 2020.

Crime in Atlanta is significantly above the national average, especially in certain predominately Black neighborhoods. Black street gangs contribute significantly to crime and violence in the area.

== Harlem ==
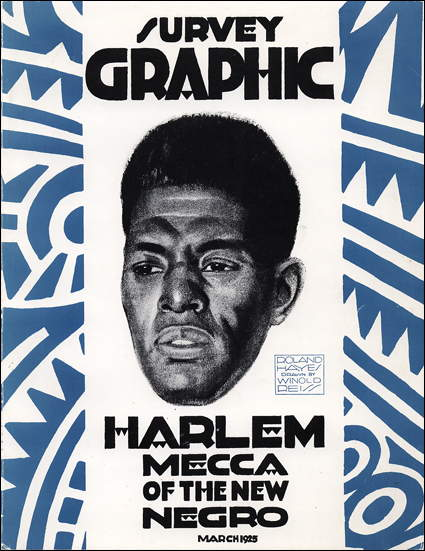
"Harlem, Mecca of the New Negro", March 1925 issue of Survey Graphic

=== Harlem renaissance ===
Harlem in New York City was widely noted as a black mecca during the 1920s and 1930s. In March 1925 the leading magazine Survey Graphic produced an issue entitled "Harlem: Mecca of the New Negro" that was devoted to the African-American literary and artistic movement now known as the "Harlem Renaissance". Alain Locke guest-edited this issue. Much of the material appears in his 1925 anthology "The New Negro." In 1965, author Seth Scheiner published the book Negro Mecca; A History of the Negro in New York City, 1865-1920.

The 2001 book Harlemworld documented that the concept of Harlem as a black mecca at that time (i.e. seven decades after the Harlem Renaissance) was still present among many residents - a concept that was "history-laden" or even quasi-mythical.

=== Mecca for West African Muslim immigrants ===
Black Mecca: The African Muslims of Harlem was also the title of a 2010 book by Temple University professor Zain Abdullah about Muslim West African immigrants in New York City, using "Mecca" not only in the generic sense of "a place that people are drawn to" but also playing on the original meaning of Mecca as the Muslim holy city.

== Houston ==
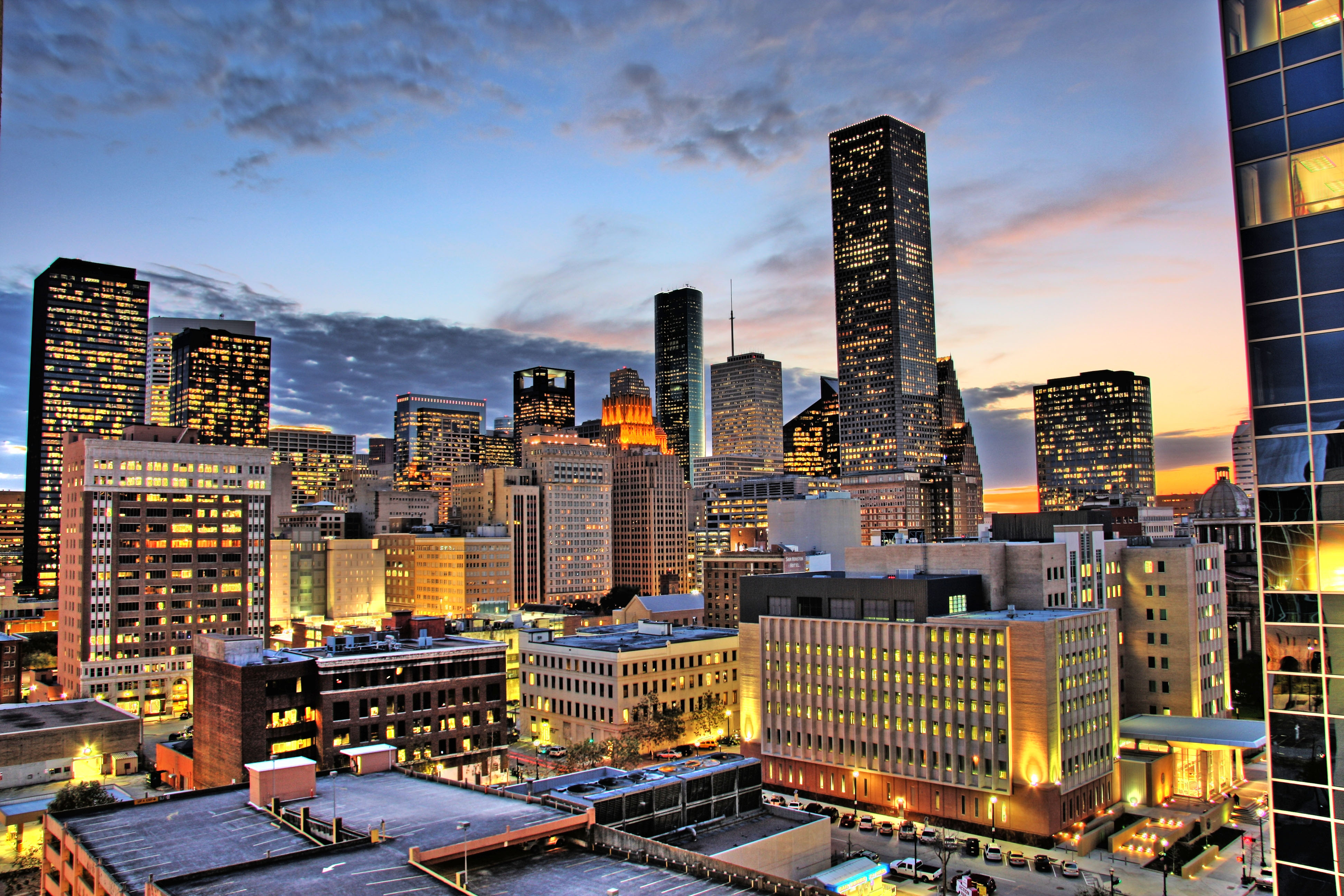
Nighttime view of the Downtown Houston skyline.

In 2016, Black Enterprise called Houston the "next great Black business Mecca of the South". The Houston metropolitan area boasts an accomplished and strategically networked community of African American entrepreneurs, executives, and business leaders as any city in the country. Houston also claims one of the most robust and effective business development and advocacy organizations in the country. The Greater Houston Black Chamber of Commerce, founded in 1935 as Houston's first black civic organization and currently led by Chairwoman Courtney Johnson Rose, is the go-to source for business development and strategic partnership opportunities, as well as education, capital, and contacts for entrepreneurs. Sylvester Turner was the city's second black mayor (in office 2016–2024). It is worth noting that it was during the mayoral term of Lee Brown (1998–2004), Houston's first African American mayor, that the city was named No. 1 on Black Enterprise's list of Top Cities for African Americans to Live, Work, and Play, edging out perennial black business meccas, including Atlanta, Harlem, and Washington, D.C. Houston has long been known as a popular destination for Black and African Americans due to the city's well-established and influential Black or African American community. Houston has an overall lower cost of living than Atlanta, Harlem, Washington, D.C., Chicago, and most other major cities in the U.S. which is an additional draw for many African Americans. The Houston area is home to the largest African American community west of the Mississippi River.

=== Historically Black colleges in Houston ===
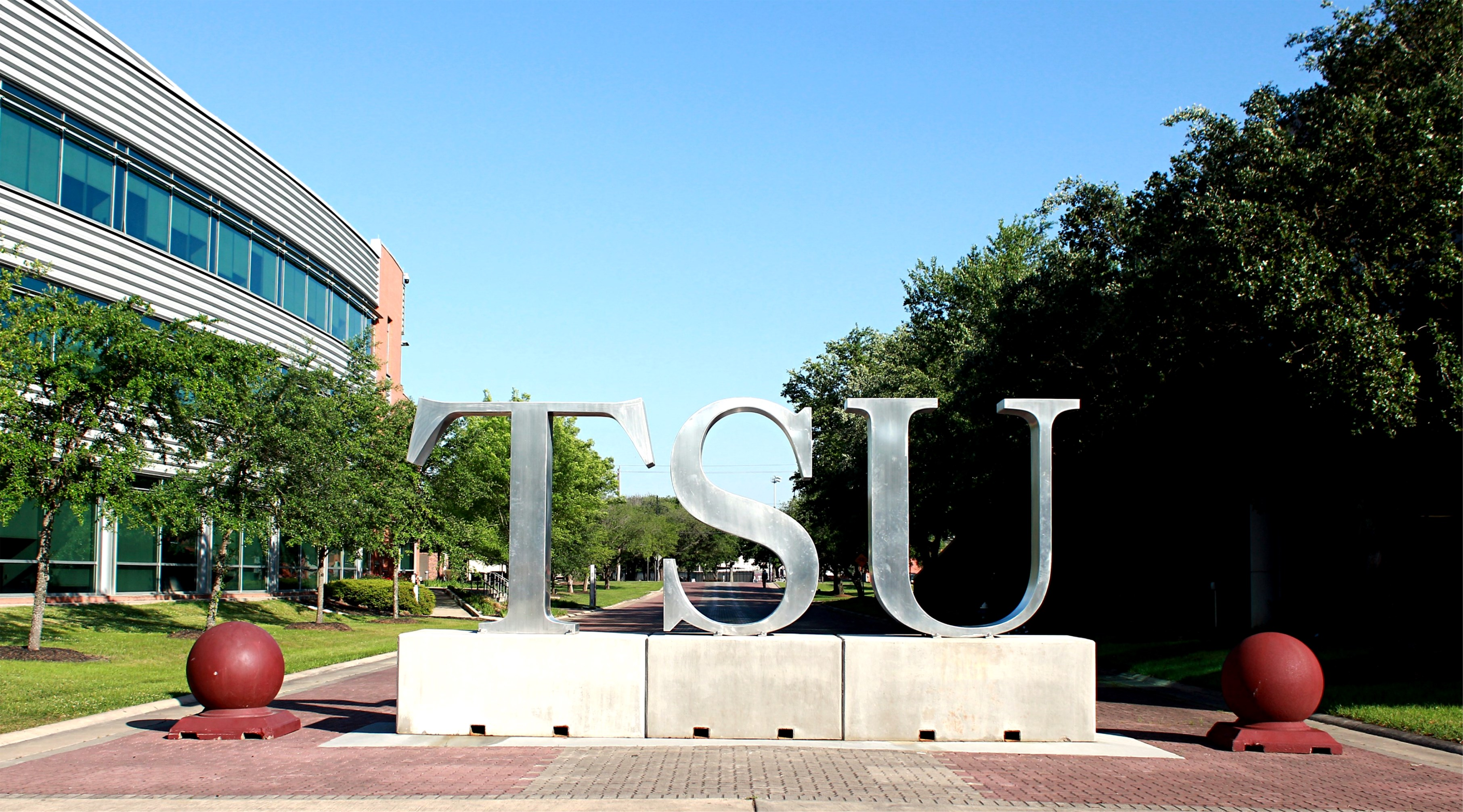
Texas Southern University in Houston

The Houston area is the only metropolitan area in the nation to have more than one HBCU with over 8,000 enrolled students. Texas Southern University is one of the largest and most comprehensive HBCUs in the nation. Prairie View A&M University, based circa 30 miles northwest of Houston, is also one of the largest HBCUs in the nation and the second oldest public university in the state.

Houston's first Sit-in on March 4, 1960 was organized and led by Texas Southern University students. The Sit-in eventually led to normalizing desegregation of Houston businesses.

=== Black educational attainment ===
According to a 2018 study, 27.5% of blacks in the Houston metro area have earned at least a bachelor's degree which is above the national black average of 21.8%.

=== Houston hip hop ===
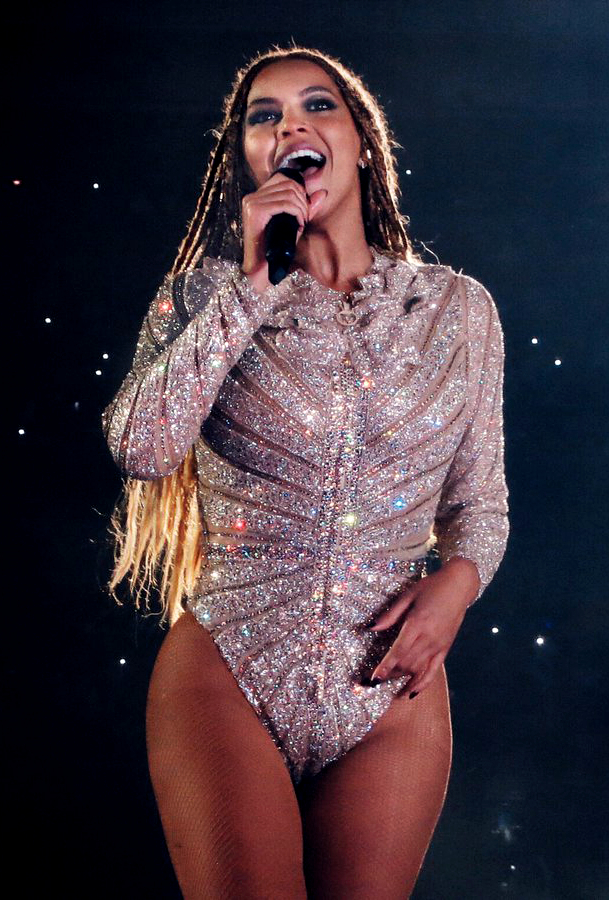
Houston native Beyonce in 2016

The Houston hip hop scene is viewed to be highly influential and distinct, recognized worldwide. In particular, the genre, chopped and screwed, created by DJ Screw in the 1990s, is deemed to be a staple in Houston's hip-hop scene. In 2005, MTV labeled Houston as “The New Rap Capital of the South”.

Southern Hip Hop artists such as Megan Thee Stallion, Travis Scott, Scarface, Sauce Walka, Bun B, Don Toliver, Slim Thug, Kirko Bangz, Lil' Keke, Z-Ro, Pimp C, Big Hawk, Mike Jones, Boss Hogg Outlawz, Lil' Troy, and Geto Boys are some popular hip-hop artists from Houston. Rapper Drake, one of the world's best selling music artists, stated he was highly influenced by Houston's Black culture and music. In May 2021, rap legend 50 Cent moved to Houston

=== Houston R&B ===
Houston is well known for producing several top-selling R&B talent. Some notables include Beyonce, Lizzo, Kelly Rowland, Letoya Luckett, Destiny's Child, Solange Knowles, Normani, H-Town, Ideal, Brooke Valentine, and Jennifer Holliday.

=== Houston Black brunch and nightlife culture ===
Houston's Black brunch and nightlife culture have grown to become highly prominent in the United States. Social media has played a major role in brunch and nightlife in the city becoming a top destination for Black adults around the world (especially Nigerians). Unlike most cities, Houston offers many popular restaurants, bars, lounges, clubs, and events that culturally caters to Black adults.

=== Black entrepreneurship ===
Houston is among the highest ranked U.S. cities for Black professional growth and achievement. The only Black-owned bank in Texas, Unity National Bank, is based in Houston. The Greater Houston Black Chamber (GHBC) is a forum for collaboration and networking of African-American owned businesses, entrepreneurs, and professionals.

=== Mecca for Nigerian immigrants ===
A significant number of African immigrants call Houston home. In addition, Houston has the largest Nigerian immigrant population in the U.S. with many of these Nigerians being highly educated and holding postgraduate degrees. Houston's large oil and gas industry and level of humidity are very similar to Nigeria. Also the Houston area is home to many high quality public and private schools which is another draw for people of Nigerian descent. The Houston area has many African-owned stores, restaurants, supermarkets, organizations, and events.

=== Criticism ===
Some challenge Houston's status as a "Black Mecca" as Black people never made up the majority. The Black percentage of the population has stayed in the 20s since the 1970s. Furthermore, some reports have named Houston the most racially diverse city in the U.S. which means every race is strongly represented.

The Houston area is also not known for having many prominent middle-class and upper-middle-class predominately Black neighborhoods compared to a few other heavily Black metropolitan areas. Although Houston has a large Black population, middle-class and upper-middle-class Blacks in the Houston area often live in more racially diverse neighborhoods where they sometimes make up a notable percentage but not over 50%.

Despite Houston ranking as one of the top cities for Black entrepreneurs, only 3.3% of Houston area registered businesses are Black-owned. According to LendingTree, there are 3,586 Black-owned businesses out of 108,772 total businesses in Houston which makes up 3.3% of all businesses while Black Americans make up 22.4% of Houston's population.

Crime in Houston is significantly above the national average, especially in certain predominately Black neighborhoods. Black street gangs contribute significantly to crime and violence in the area.

== Other U.S. cities and statistics ==
Only Atlanta, Chicago, Harlem, Houston, and Washington, D.C., are, over time and in multiple sources, mentioned as black meccas.

Comparison of black-majority cities at the time of the 2010 US Census:

City	Black population, 2010	Black-owned firms, 2007	Black median household income, 2009
Detroit	82.7%	64.2%	$26,759
Baltimore	63.7%	34.6%	$37,225
Memphis	63.3%	38.2%	$31,490
New Orleans	60.2%	28.9%	$25,324
Baton Rouge	54.5%	30.4%	$30,188
Atlanta	54%	30.9%	$29,107
Cleveland	53.3%	26.6%	$20,910
Newark	52.4%	35.3%	$28,275
Washington	50.7%	28.2%	$37,891
Richmond	50.6%	20.9%	$25,355

== Canada ==
=== Chatham, Ontario ===
In the 1850s, the city of Chatham, Ontario was referred to as the "Black Mecca of Canada", as a final stop on the Underground Railroad. A museum in the city, the Black Mecca Museum, still bears this name. The small city was home to a number of black churches and business, with Black Canadians making up 1/3 of the city's population and controlling a significant portion of the city's political power. Nearby Dresden and Buxton were home to thousands of land-owning black residents. The 2021 documentary, The North Star: Finding Black Mecca explores this chapter of Chatham's history.
