= Maka (name) =

Maka, Mąka, or Máka is a personal name. In the Māori language, Maka/Māka is a transliteration of the name Mark. Notable people with the name include:

== Given name ==
- Maka Bochorishvili (born 1978), Georgian diplomat and politician
- Maka Chichua (born 1971), First Lady of Georgia from 2014 to 2018
- Maka Jiba (died 1764), ruler of Bundu
- Maka Mary (born 1989), French professional footballer
- Maka Obolashvili (born 1975), Georgian track and field athlete
- Maka Purtseladze (born 1988), Georgian chess player
- Maka Unufe (born 1991), American rugby union player

== Surname ==
- Anna Mąka (luger) (born 1948), Polish luger
- Anna Mąka (biathlete) (born 1992), Polish biathlete
- Claude Maka Kum (born 1985), footballer
- Daniel Mąka (born 1988), Polish footballer
- Donald Maka, rugby union player
- Ebrahim Maka (1922–1994), Indian cricketer
- Edwin Maka (born 1993), New Zealand-born Tongan rugby union player
- Finau Maka (born 1977), New Zealand rugby union player
- Francis Maka (born 1985), American football player
- František Máka (born 1968), Czech skier
- Gabriel Maka (died 2011), Zambian politician
- Isitolo Maka (born 1975), New Zealand rugby union player
- Karl Maka (born 1944), Hong Kong actor and director
- Latiume Maka (born 1970), Tongan rugby union player
- Leki Maka (born 1985), New Zealand boxer
- Léopold-Marcel Kotto-Maka, also known as Maka Kotto (born 1961), Canadian politician and actor
- Magan Maka (born 1993), Tongan New Zealander boxer
- Pascal Maka, French windsurfer
- Sofai Maka (born 2001), New Zealand rugby union player
- Stone Maka (born 1970), Tongan artist
- Taïna Maka (born 2004), French rugby union player
- Tomasi Maka (born 2002), Australian rugby union player

== Nickname ==
- Maka (born 1985), Spanish flamenco singer

== Fictional characters ==
- Funhouse (Makana "Maka" Akana), a Marvel Comics supervillain
- Maka Albarn, a character in the Soul Eater manga and anime series

== See also ==
- Maka
