= Macas =

Macas may refer to:

- Macas (city), the capital city of the province of Morona Santiago in Ecuador
- Macas Airport, airport near Macas, Ecuador
- Luis Macas (born 1951), Kichwa politician and intellectual from Saraguro, Ecuador
- Arvydas "Macas" Macijauskas (born 1980), Lithuanian basketball player

== See also ==
- MACA (disambiguation)
