= MECA =

Meca or MECA may refer to:

== Biology ==
- mecA (gene), responsible for methicillin resistance in MRSA
- Meca (moth), a snout moth genus in the subfamily Pyralinae

== Places ==
- Meca (Alenquer), Portugal, a parish
- Los Caños de Meca, a seaside village in Spain
- Maine College of Art
- Middle East Center for the Arts, at Mana Contemporary in Jersey City, New Jersey
- Meca, Swindon, a music and entertainment venue in Swindon, England

== Other ==
- Marriage Equality California
- Maria Meca, Ibizan abolitionist
- Meca (footballer) (born 1978), Spanish footballer
- Meca Tanaka, Japanese shojo manga artist,

== See also ==
- Mecca, a city in present-day Saudi Arabia
- Mecca (disambiguation)
- Mecha (disambiguation)
