= Macca =

Macca may refer to:

== People ==
- Mackenzie Arnold (born 1994), Australian soccer player who plays as a goalkeeper
- Paul McCartney (born 1942), English singer-songwriter and multi-instrumentalist
- Chris McCormack (triathlete) (born 1973), Australian Ironman champion
- Amy Macdonald (singer) (born 1987), Scottish musician
- Andrew McLeod (born 1976), Australian rules footballer and Norm Smith medalist
- Steve McManaman (born 1972), English footballer known as 'El Macca'
- Stephen McPhail (born 1979), Irish footballer
- Gary McAllister (born 1964), Scottish footballer and manager
- Gary McSheffrey (born 1982), English footballer
- Steve McMahon (born 1961), former English footballer
- Bruce McAvaney (born 1953), Australian sports broadcaster
- Neil McKenzie (born 1975), South African cricketer
- Paul McNamee (born 1954), Australian tennis player and sports administrator
- Steve McNamara (born 1971), British rugby league player and coach
- Ian McNamara (born 1951), Australian radio presenter
- Alexis Mac Allister (born 1998), Argentine footballer

=== Fictional characters ===
- Michael "Macca" MacKenzie, a character on the Australian soap opera Home and Away

== Places ==
- A variant spelling of the holy city Mecca
- Macquarie Island, Australia

== Groups, organizations, companies ==
- Macca Oromo, a subgroup of the Oromo people
- McDonald's, nicknamed "Macca's" in Australia and New Zealand
- McLaren, an English Formula One Grand Prix team

== Other uses ==
- A fictional currency in the Megami Tensei series

== See also ==
- Mac (disambiguation)
- Maca (disambiguation)
- Macaw
- Makar
- Makka (disambiguation)
- McCaw
- Mecca (disambiguation)
- Machair
