= Maka-Maka =

Maka-Maka may refer to:

- OpenSocial
- Maka-Maka (manga), a yuri manga by Torajirō Kishi
- Maka Maka, a Super Famicom video game
- Maka Maka, stylized as MAKA`MAKA, a K-pop girl group
- Makaa Maka, an album by Ghanaian rapper Reggie Rockstone
