= Farabana =

Farabana Farabana
- town of Mali
- Location in Mali
- Coordinates: 14.176373°N 11.913341°W
- Country: Mali
- Region: Kayes Region
- Cercle: Kayes Province

Farabana (Also Farbanna) is a town in western Mali, 58 km west of the city of Kayes. It is located in Kayes Cercle within Kayes Region.

== History ==
The town first gained prominence during the early to mid eighteenth century through its conflict with the state of Bundu. Amadi Tumane had assumed the rulership of Farabana following his father's death in 1737. At this time, the town was one of the more powerful of the Bambuk region, occupying control over trade routes and over artisanal gold mining. This dominance was challenged by Maka Jiba, ruler of Bundu, who sought control over the region for himself. A European trader by the name of Daivd would establish a trading post at Farabana, but the conflict between the two towns reduced trade output.

Later in the 18th century, Bundu would attempt once more to establish dominance over Farabama, this time under Amadi Gai. Although successful in denying the town access to trading posts along the River Gambia, he was unable to take the town, having tried and failed twice through siege to do so.

In 1854, the town was occupied by Omar Tall of the Toucouleur Empire, occupying the city with 3,000 of his followers. Later in 1856, the town under Bugul turned against Umar, joining Bundunke forces under Bokar Saada in an attack against Kenieba. However, this alliance between the two towns did not last long. In 1860, tensions between the two boiled into war, with Bokar's forces razing the town. The town would again suffer a raid by Bundunke forces in 1885.

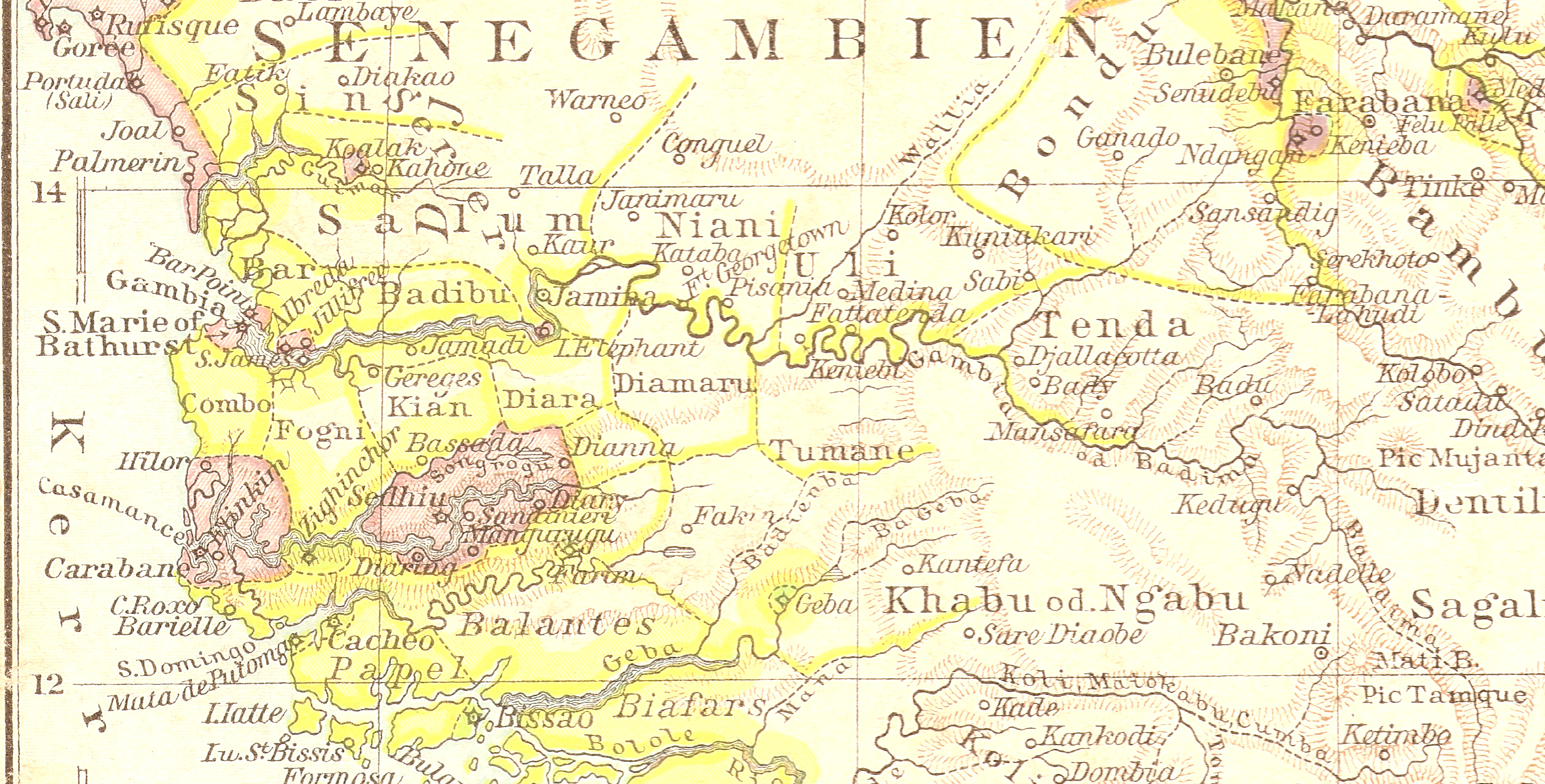
An 1881 map of the River Gambia region. Farabana appears on the top-right.

== Sources ==
- Robinson, David (1985). The Holy War of Umar Tal: The Western Sudan in the mid-Nineteenth Century. Oxford: the Clarendon Press.
- Gomez, Michael A. (1992). Pragmatism in the Age of Jihad: The precolonial state of Bundu. Cambridge: Cambridge University Press.
