= Survey Graphic =

- Former editors: Paul Underwood Kellogg
- Company: Survey Associates, Inc.
- Country: United States
- Based in: New York City
- Language: English
- ISSN: 0196-8777

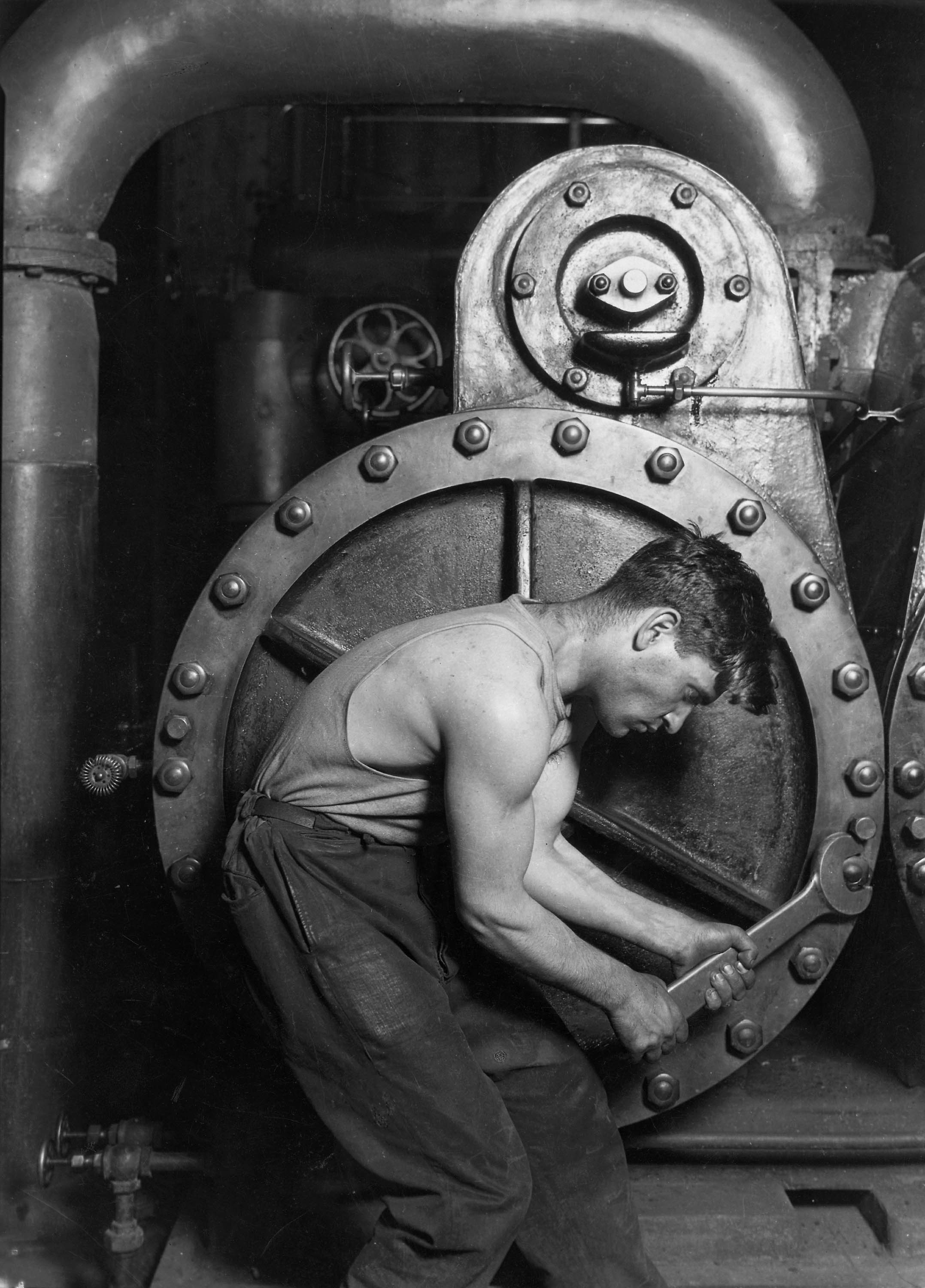
Survey Graphic published Lewis Hine's series of "work portraits" in the 1920s

Survey Graphic (SG) was a United States magazine launched in 1921. From 1921 to 1932, it was published as a supplement to The Survey and became a separate publication in 1933. SG focused on sociological and political research and analysis of national and international issues. Bidding his readers to "embark on a voyage of discovery", editor Paul Kellogg used a metaphor of a ship in his inaugural remarks for the new magazine: "Survey Graphic will reach into the corners of the world — America and all the Seven Seas — to wherever the tides of a generous progress are astir." Article topics included fascism, anti-Semitism, poverty, unions and the working class, and education and political reform. The magazine ceased publication in 1952.

In March 1925 the magazine produced an issue on "Harlem: Mecca of the New Negro", which was devoted to the African-American literary and artistic movement now known as the Harlem Renaissance and established Harlem's status as the black mecca. Alain Locke guest-edited this issue. Much of the material appears in his 1925 anthology The New Negro.
