= MACA =

Maca is an edible plant endemic to the Andes.

MACA or maca can mean:

== Places ==
- Maca District, Peru
- Cerro Macá, stratovolcano in the Aisén Region of Chile
- Maca River, Romania
- Alicante Museum of Contemporary Art (Spanish: Museo de Arte Contemporáneo de Alicante), Spain

== People ==
- Alain Maca (born 1950), Belgian-American retired soccer player
- Joe Maca (1920-1982), American soccer player
- Dragan Marinković (actor) (born 1968), Bosnian and Serbian actor

== Organisations ==
- Together for Mental Wellbeing, a UK charity (formerly Mental After Care Association)
- Mongol-American Cultural Association

== Science and technology ==
- 5228 Máca, a minor planet
- Multiple Access with Collision Avoidance, a wireless LAN protocol

== Other uses ==
- Military aid to the civil authorities (MACA), a term used by the UK government
- Make America Crip Again (MACA), a 2017 EP by Snoop Dogg

== See also ==
- Macas (disambiguation)
- Maka (disambiguation)
- Movimiento de Arte y Cultura Latino Americana (MACLA), a museum in San Jose, California
