= Mecca Ointment =

First aid ointment brand

Mecca Ointment

Mecca Ointment is the product name of a first aid ointment used for the temporary relief of pain and/or itching associated with minor burns, sunburn, minor cuts, scrapes, insect bites and for the temporary protection of minor skin irritations. The formulation contains the medicinal ingredients Phenol 0.5%, Camphor 0.5% and Zinc Oxide 1.25%. Mecca Ointment is currently available for sale in Canada.

== History of Mecca Ointment ==
Analytic chemist Albert D. Foster created the formula for Mecca Compound in 1898. Foster was one of the founders of the Foster-Dack Company (Chicago), the original producers of Mecca Ointment. The Foster-Dack Co. first sold Mecca Ointment in the United States in the later part of the 19th and early 20th century. Mecca Ointment was introduced into Canada in the early 20th century. The Canadian office and manufacturing facility of Foster-Dack was located at 337 King St. W. in Toronto, Ontario. Mecca Ointment was also available in England and Scotland in the early 20th century.

The Foster-Dack Co. was the proprietor of Mecca Ointment until it sold all the intellectual property rights in connection with Mecca Ointment to The Mentholatum Company of Orchard Park, New York, USA, which continued to manufacture and sell Mecca Ointment until 2004. On February 8, 2011, Vintage Brands Ltd. acquired all the intellectual property rights in connection with Mecca Ointment from The Mentholatum Company.

=== Notable dates in the history of Mecca Ointment ===
1888 Albert D. Foster was a practicing analytic chemist and pharmacist at his drug store in Council Bluffs, Iowa. He invented a medicinal ointment that he prescribed and sold to homes.

1898 Albert D. Foster opened a laboratory in Chicago, Illinois, US, to produce Mecca Ointment, sometime around or before 1898. The US office was located at 3148 Cottage Grove in Chicago, Illinois.

1907 On January 18, 1907, the Foster-Dack Company was incorporated in Canada. The Canadian office was located at 337 King St. W. in Toronto, Ontario.

1920 The Foster-Dack Co. published an information pamphlet entitled "Mecca Ointment - The Household Remedy." An original copy of this pamphlet is archived in the Patent Medicine Collection of the Health Sciences Library at McMaster University in Hamilton, Ontario, Canada.

1921 "Mecca Compound" was registered as a trademark with the United States Patent and Trade Office (USPTO) by the Foster-Dack Company.

1922 On February 24, 1922, the Mecca trademark was registered in Canada by the Foster-Dack Company.

1929 On December 7, 1929, the Foster-Dack Company of Chicago incorporated. The shareholders were A.D. Foster; his three daughters, Alice Foster McKesson, Jessica Foster and Grace Foster; Eugene W. Peterson Sr.; and Eugene W. Peterson Jr.

1970 The Foster-Dack Company Ltd. was dissolved on March 10, 1970.

1972 In February 1972, the Canadian trademark for Mecca was transferred to The Mentholatum Company.

2011 On February 8, 2011, Vintage Brands Ltd. acquired all intellectual property rights connected to the Mecca Ointment product from The Mentholatum Company.
