= Maka village =

Village in Pakistan

Maka Village is believed to be one of the oldest villages in the Shikarpur District of Sindh, Pakistan. It is located near the city of Lakhi.
