= Mecha (selo) =

Mecha Меча
- Selo
- Location within Perm Krai Location within Russia
- Coordinates: 57°15′N 57°30′E
- Country: Russia
- Region: Perm Krai
- District: Kishertsky District
- Time zone: UTC+5:00

Mecha (Russian: Меча) is a rural locality (a selo) in Osintsevskoye Rural Settlement, Kishertsky District, Perm Krai, Russia. The population was 389 as of 2010. There are 5 streets.

== Geography ==
Mecha is located 30 km southeast of Ust-Kishert (the district's administrative centre) by road. Dom otkykha 'Krasny Yar' is the nearest rural locality.
