= List of largest cities west of the Mississippi River =

This is a list of the largest cities west of the Mississippi River. The largest city on this list is Los Angeles, California. The portion of the United States that is west of the Mississippi River has more cities with over one million inhabitants than the east does. The west has about seven such cities while the east only has three. Cities in Alaska and Hawaii will be on this list. California and Texas have the most cities on this list. Cities with populations of over 300,000 with be on the list totaling 40.

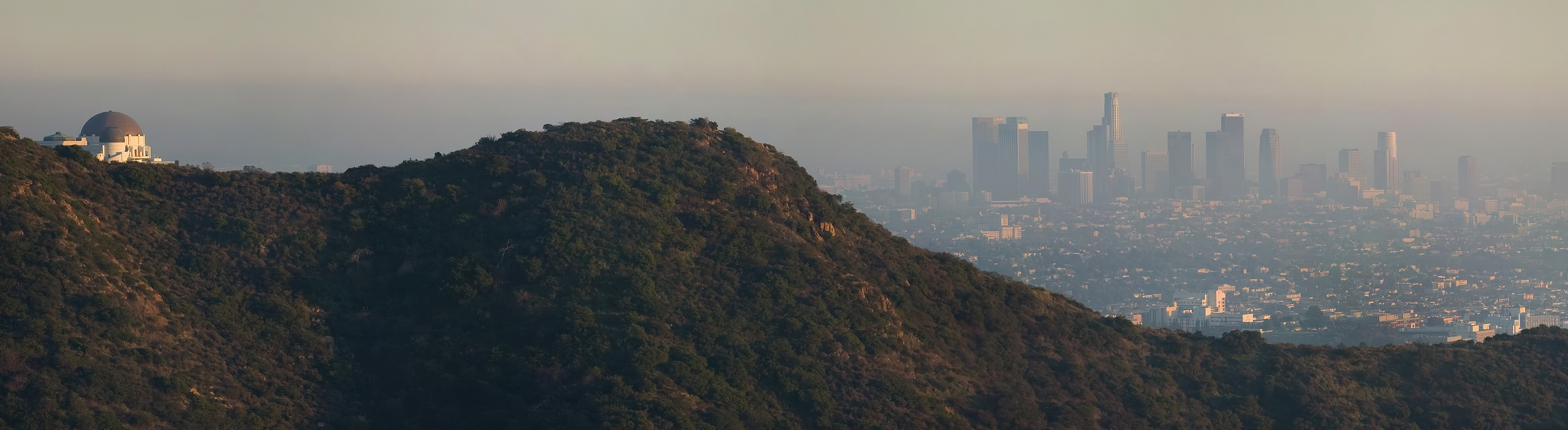
Downtown Los Angeles

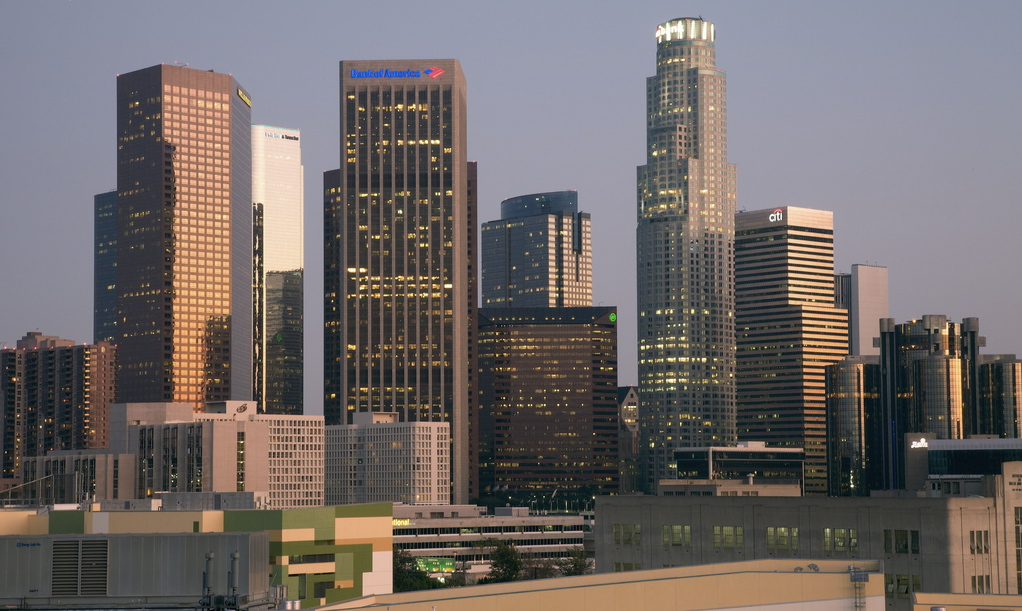
Los Angeles, California

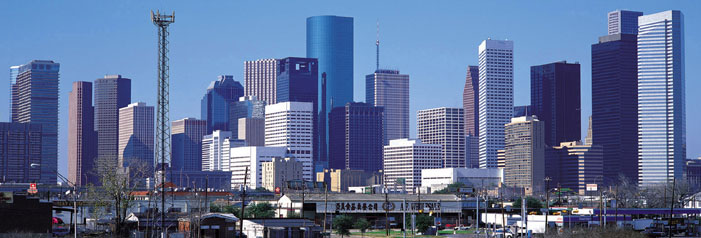
Houston, Texas

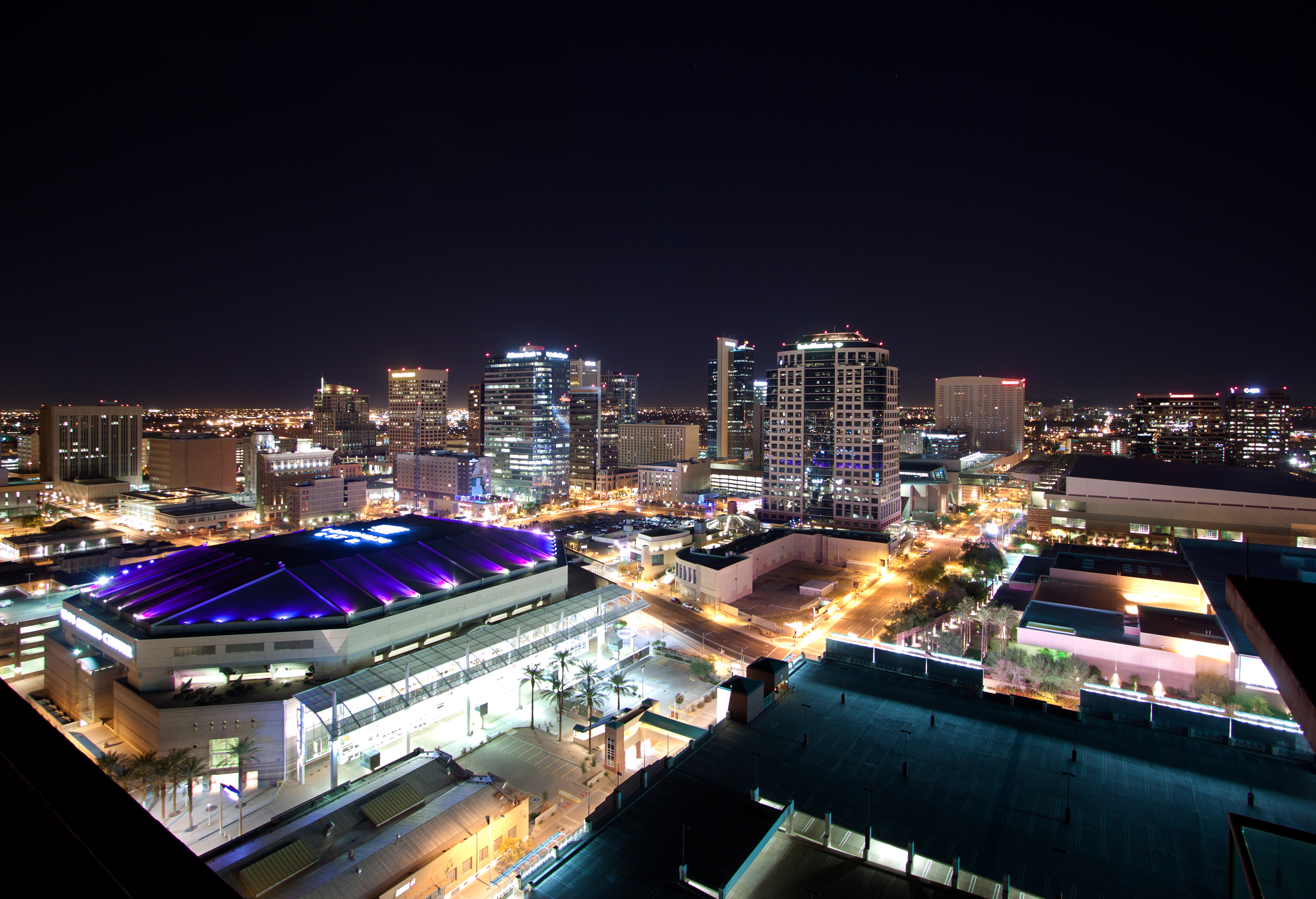
Phoenix, Arizona at night

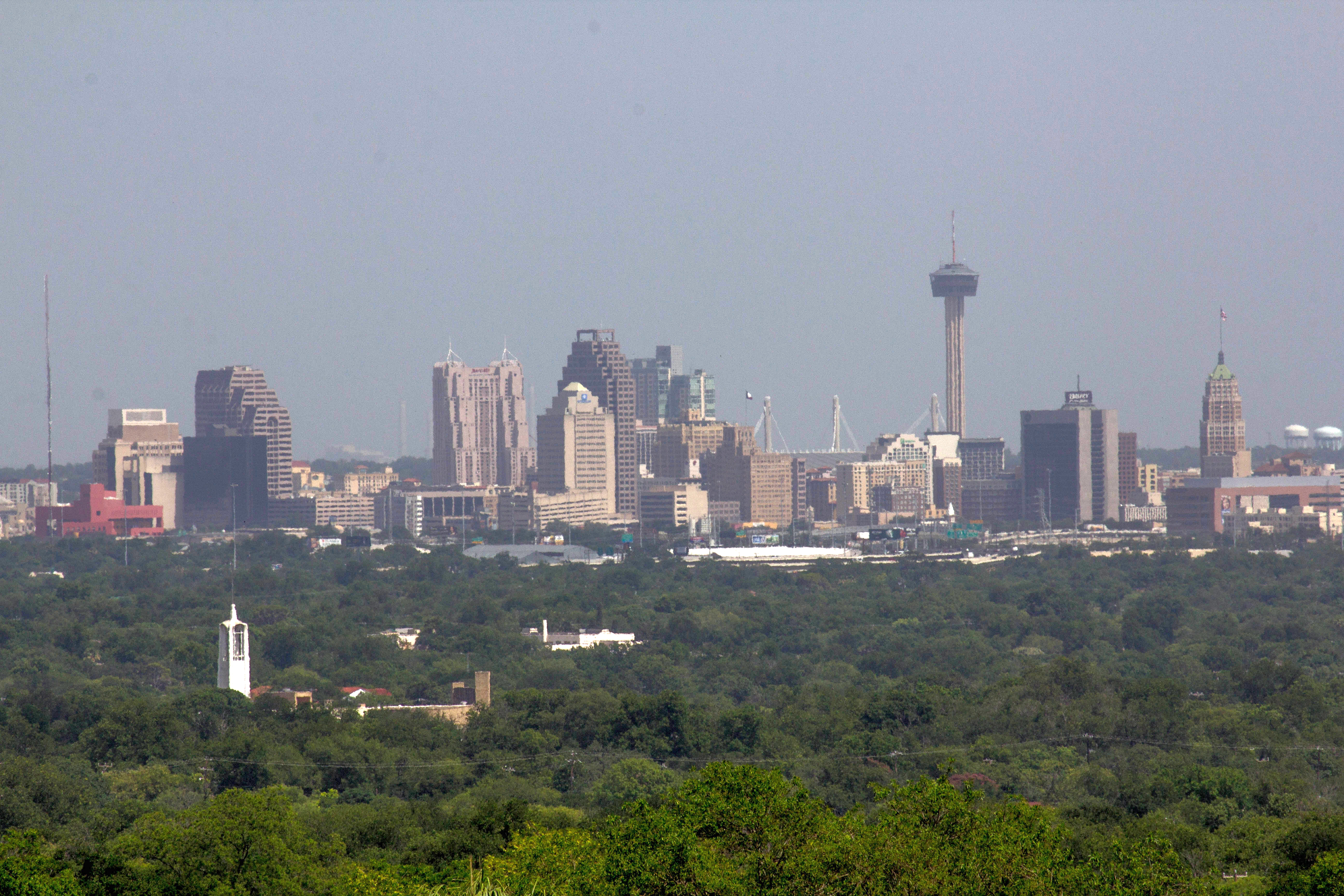
San Antonio, Texas

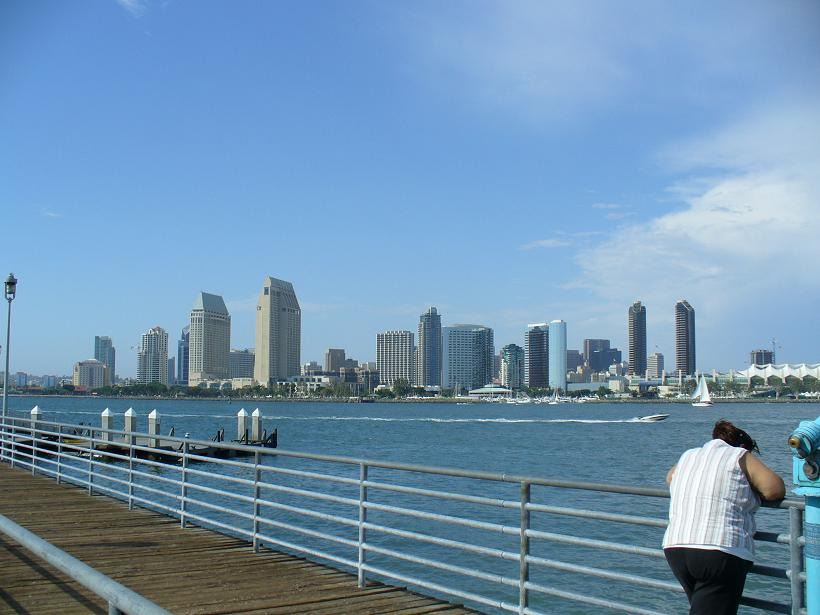
San Diego, California

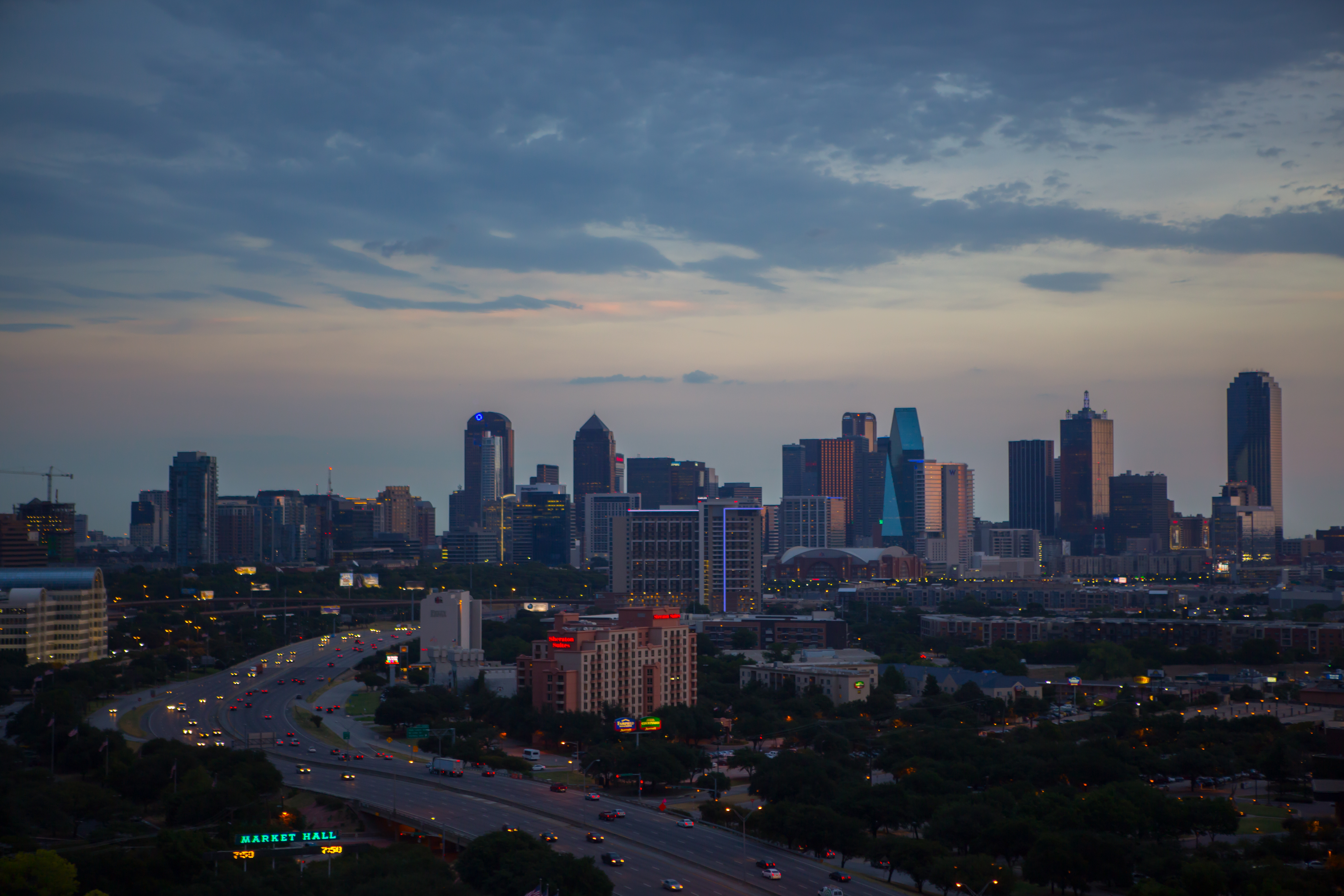
Dallas, Texas

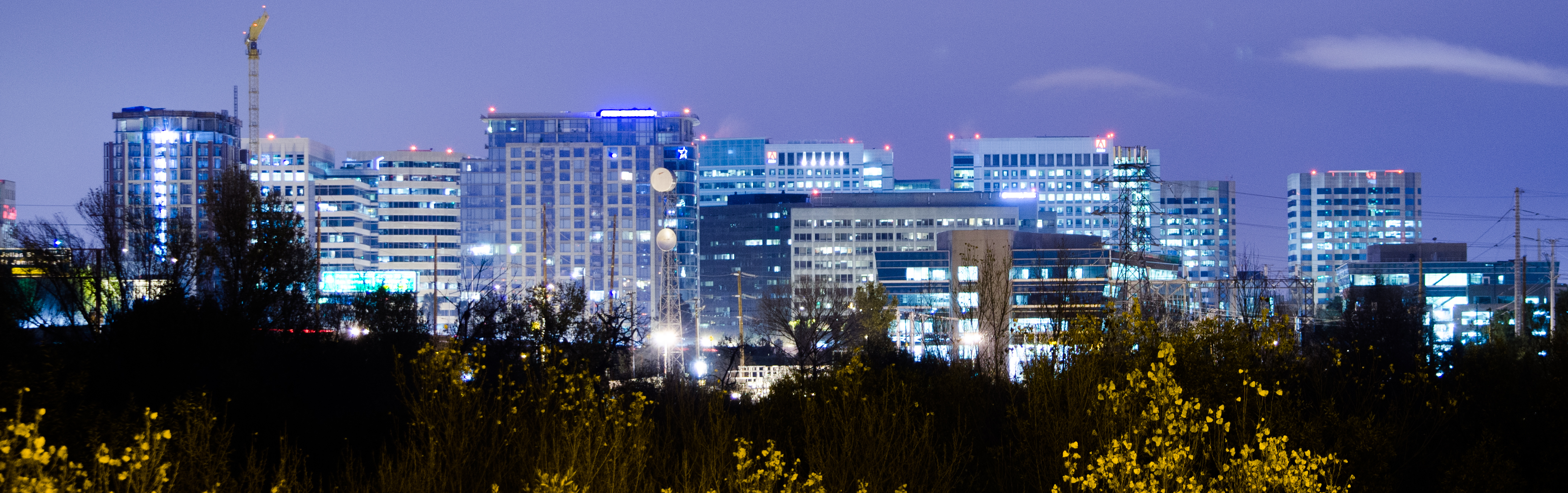
San Jose, California

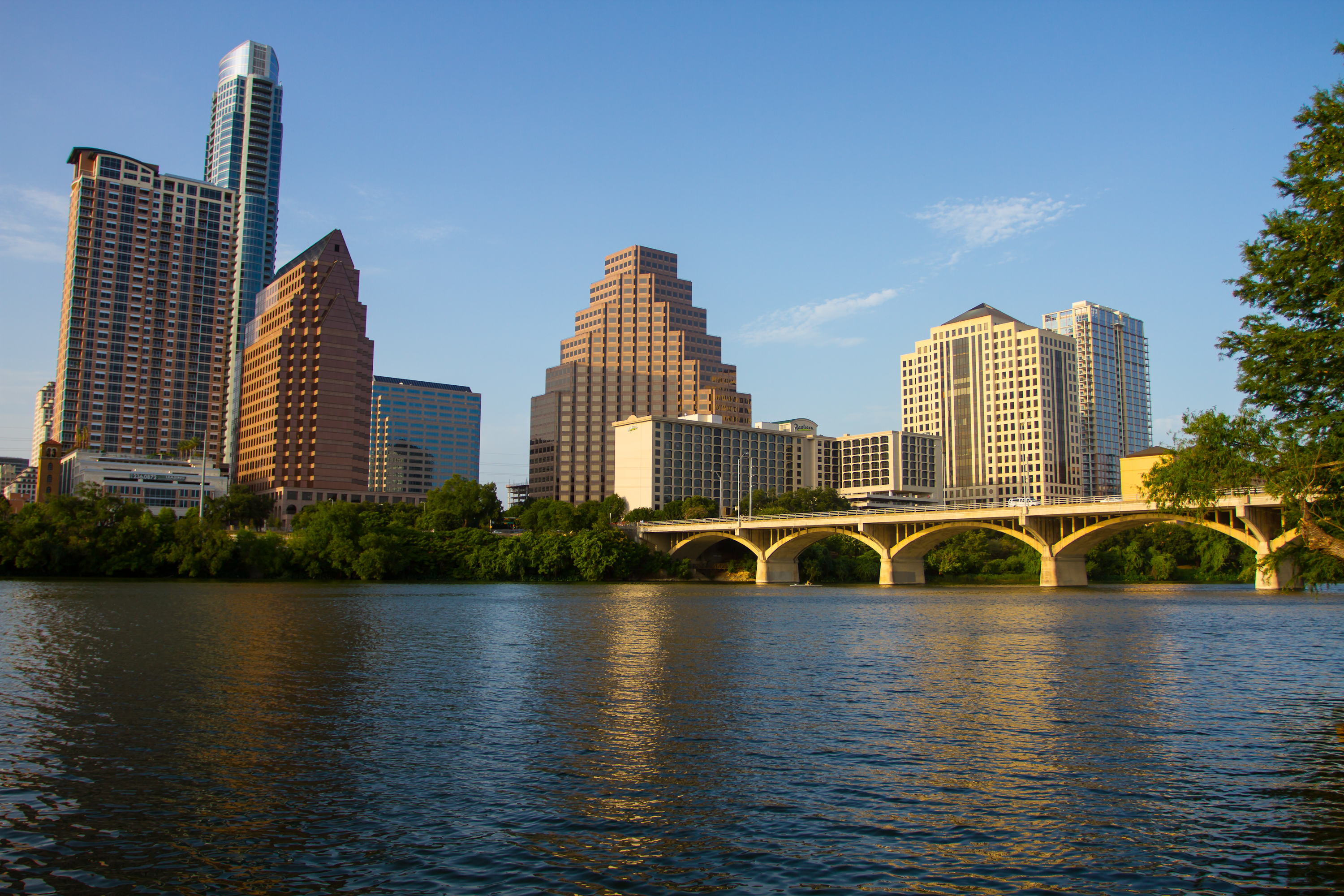
Austin, Texas

Rank (US)	Rank (West of the Mississippi River)	City	State	Population	Density per square mile.	Notes
2	1	Los Angeles	California	3,979,576	8,092 per sq mile	Largest city in California, largest city west of the Mississippi River 2nd largest metro area in the United States.
4	2	Houston	Texas	2,316,797	3,501 per sq mile	Largest city in Texas, 2nd largest metro in Texas after Dallas-Fort Worth.
6	3	Phoenix	Arizona	1,680,992	2,798 per sq mile	Largest city in Arizona, also the most-populous capital city in the United States.
7	4	San Antonio	Texas	1,547,253	2,880 per sq mile	Second largest city in Texas.
8	5	San Diego	California	1,423,852	4,020 per sq mile	2nd largest city in California.
9	6	Dallas	Texas	1,343,573	3,518 per sq mile	3rd largest city in Texas, largest city in the Dallas-Fort Worth metro area.
10	7	San Jose	California	1,021,795	5,359 per sq mile	3rd largest city in California, largest city in the San Francisco Bay Area, largest city in the United States with a height restriction.
11	8	Austin	Texas	978,908	2,653 per sq mile	Largest city in the United States that has less than a million people.
16	9	Fort Worth	Texas	909,585	2,181 per sq mile	2nd largest city in the Dallas-Fort Worth metro area.
13	10	San Francisco	California	881,549	17,179 per sq mile	4th largest city in California.
18	11	Seattle	Washington	753,675	7,251 per sq mile	First city in Washington to make the list, largest city in the United States of America with a population of under 800,000.
19	12	Denver	Colorado	734,134	3,923 per sq mile	First city in Colorado to make the list.
20	13	El Paso	Texas	681,728	2,543 per sq mile	First city with a metro area that goes outside of the state that the city is in.
26	14	Oklahoma City	Oklahoma	655,057	956 per sq mile	First city in Oklahoma to make the list, first city to have the word city in its name on the list.
27	15	Portland	Oregon	654,741	4,375 per sq mile	First city in Oregon to make the list.
28	16	Las Vegas	Nevada	651,319	4,298 per sq mile	First city in Nevada to make the list.
32	17	Albuquerque	New Mexico	560,513	2,908 per sq mile	First city in New Mexico to make the list.
33	18	Tucson	Arizona	548,073	2,294 per sq mile	2nd largest city in Arizona.
34	19	Fresno	California	542,012	4,418 per sq mile	5th largest city in California.
38	20	Mesa	Arizona	518,012	3,218 per sq mile	3rd largest city in Arizona.
35	21	Sacramento	California	513,624	4,764 per sq mile	Capital of California
36	22	Kansas City	Missouri	486,404	1,460 per sq mile	First and largest city in Missouri to appear on this list.
40	23	Colorado Springs	Colorado	478,221	2,141 per sq mile	2nd largest city in Colorado.
43	24	Omaha	Nebraska	478,192	3,218 per sq mile	First and largest city in Nebraska to appear on the list.
37	25	Long Beach	California	462,628	9,191 per sq mile	City in the Los Angeles metro area.
45	26	Oakland	California	433,031	7,004 per sq mile	2nd largest city in the San Francisco Bay Area.
46	27	Minneapolis	Minnesota	429,606	7,088 per sq mile	First and largest city in Minnesota to appear on this list. Though technically a good portion of Minneapolis is east of the Mississippi river!
47	28	Tulsa	Oklahoma	401,190	1,992 per sq mile	2nd largest city in Oklahoma.
50	29	Arlington	Texas	398,854	3,811 per sq mile	3rd largest city in the Dallas-Fort Worth metro area.
48	30	Wichita	Kansas	389,938	2,400 per sq mile	First and largest city in Kansas to appear on this list.
52	31	Bakersfield	California	384,145	2,444 per sq mile	Halfway between Fresno and Los Angeles.
54	32	Aurora	Colorado	379,289	2,110 per sq mile	3rd largest city in Colorado.
56	33	Anaheim	California	350,365	6,748 per sq mile	Part of the Los Angeles metro area.
55	34	Honolulu	Hawai'i	345,064	5,573 per sp mile	First, largest and only city in Hawai'i that is going to be on this list.
57	35	Santa Ana	California	332,318	11,901 per sq mile	Also part of the Los Angeles metro area
58	36	Corpus Christi	Texas	326,586	1,900 per sq mile	Texas's southernmost metro area.
58	37	Riverside	California	331,360	3,745 per sq mile	Another city in the Los Angeles metro area.
61	38	Henderson	Nevada	320,189	3,017.06 per sq mile	Largest suburb of Las Vegas.
62	39	Stockton	California	312,697	4,730 per sq mile	Halfway between Sacramento and San Jose.
63	40	Saint Paul	Minnesota	308,096	5,927.43 per sq mile	Capital of the state of Minnesota.
65	41	St. Louis	Missouri	300,576	5,157 per sq mile	Home of the Gateway Arch, 2nd largest city in Missouri.
68	42	Lincoln	Nebraska	289,102	2,887.2 per sq mile	Capital of the state of Nebraska.
70	43	Plano	Texas	287,677	4,012.96 per sq mile	Suburb of Dallas.
72	44	Irvine	California	287,401	4,380.24 per sq mile	City in Orange County.
75	45	Chula Vista	California	274,492	5,529.76 per sq mile	Suburb of San Diego.
79	46	Laredo	Texas	262,491	2,464.96 per sq mile	City in Southern Texas.
81	47	Chandler	Arizona	261,165	4,001.06 per sq mile	Suburb of Phoenix.
83	48	Lubbock	Texas	258,870	1,923.17 per sq mile	Second largest city after El Paso in Texas west of San Antonio.
84	49	Scottsdale	Arizona	258,069	1,402.66 per sq mile	Suburb of Phoenix.
85	50	Reno	Nevada	255,601	2,350.48 per sq mile	Largest city in Nevada outside of the Las Vegas Valley.
86	51	Des Moines	Iowa	559,000,	90.65 per sq mile	First and largest city in Iowa to appear on this list.
87	52	Little Rock	Arkansas	201,998,	120.05 per sq mile	First and largest city in Arkansas to appear on this list.
88	53	New Orleans	Louisiana	376,971,	1,907 per sq mile	First and largest city in Louisiana to appear on this list.
89	54	Baton Rouge	Louisiana	756,000,	88.52 per sq mile	Capital of the state of Louisiana.
90	55	Cedar Rapids	Iowa	136,774,	72.07 per sq mile	2nd largest city in Iowa.

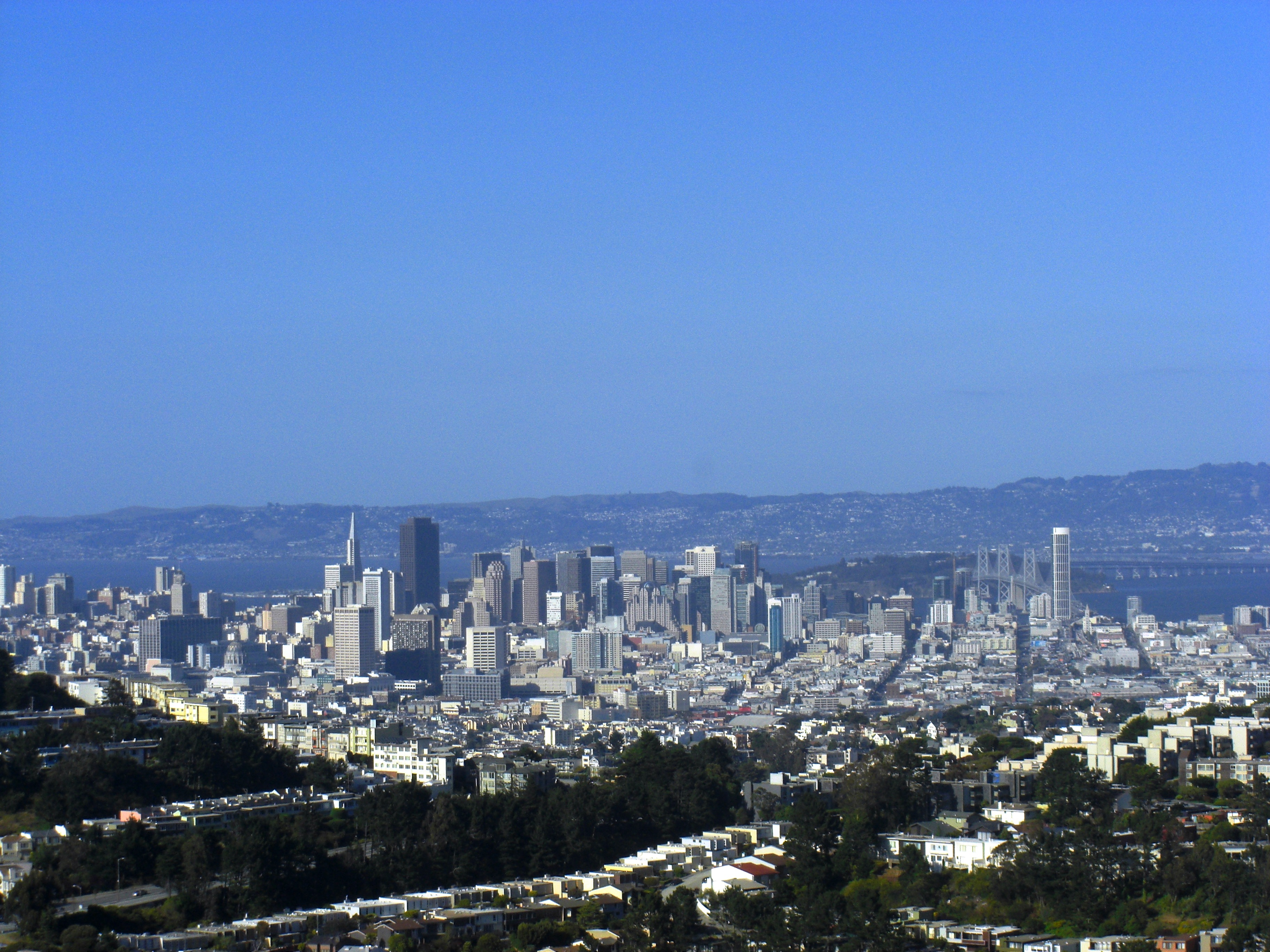
San Francisco, California

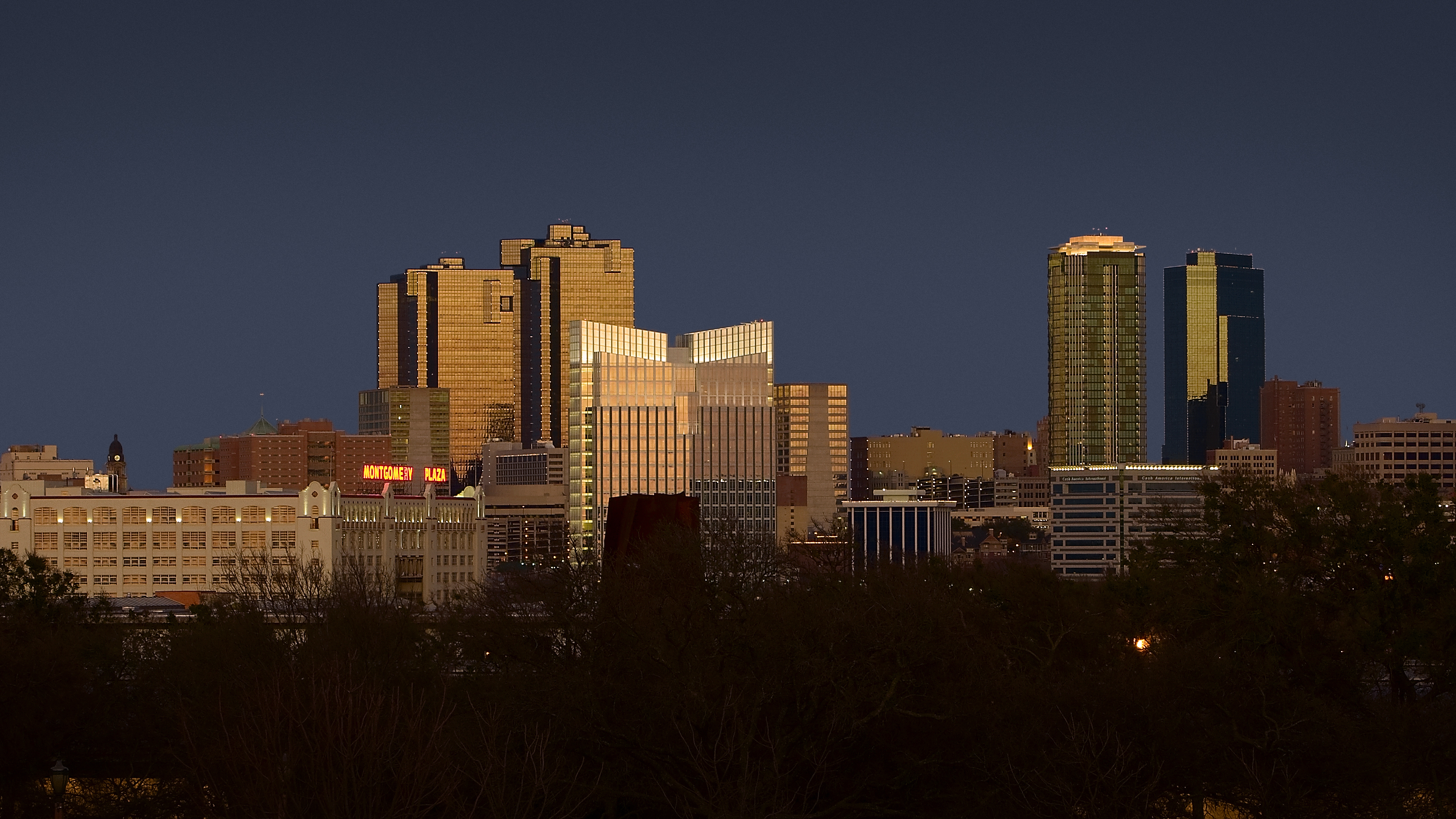
Fort Worth, Texas

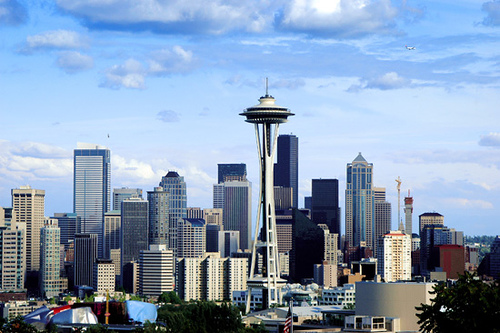
Seattle, Washington

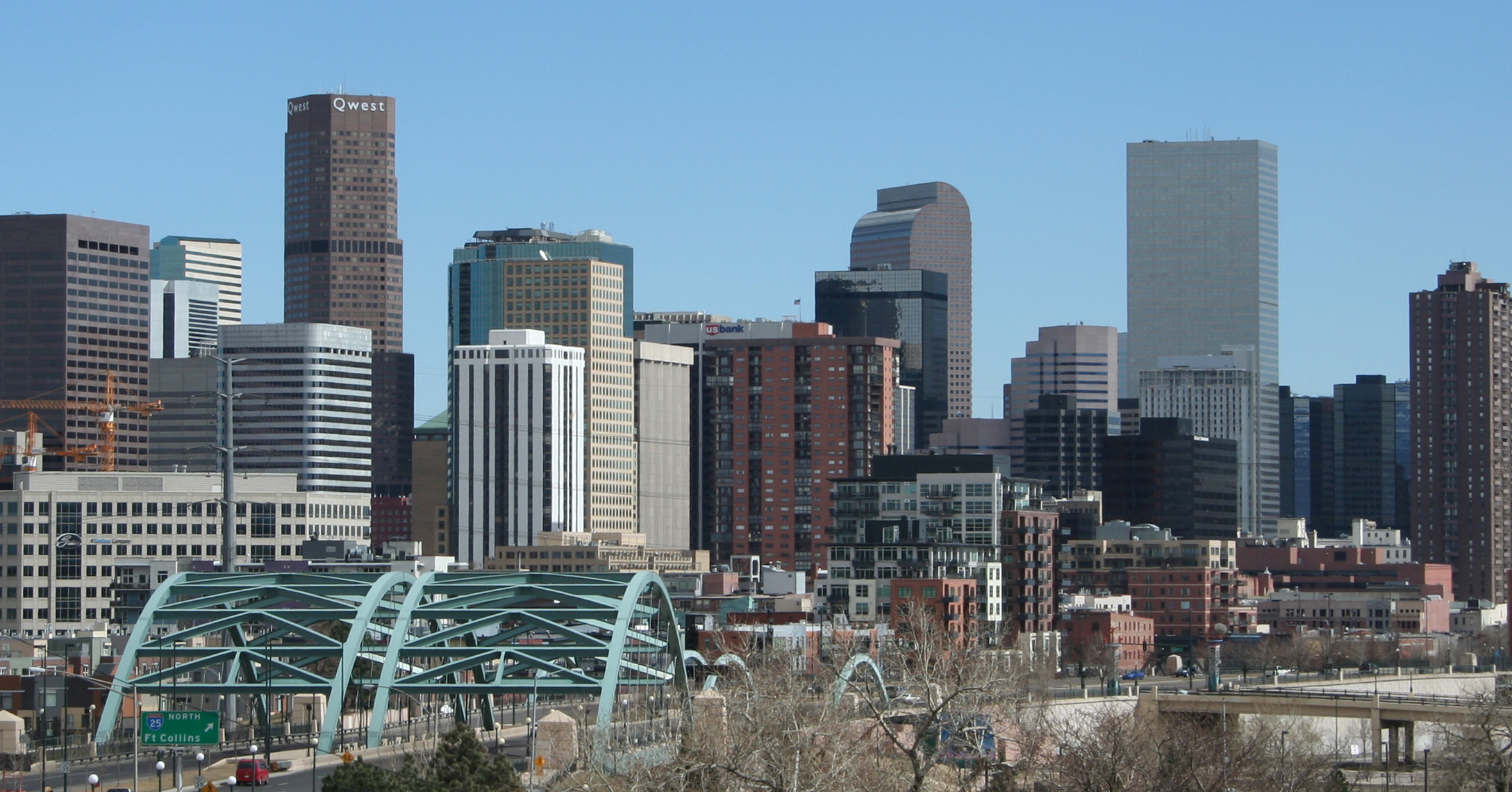
Denver, Colorado

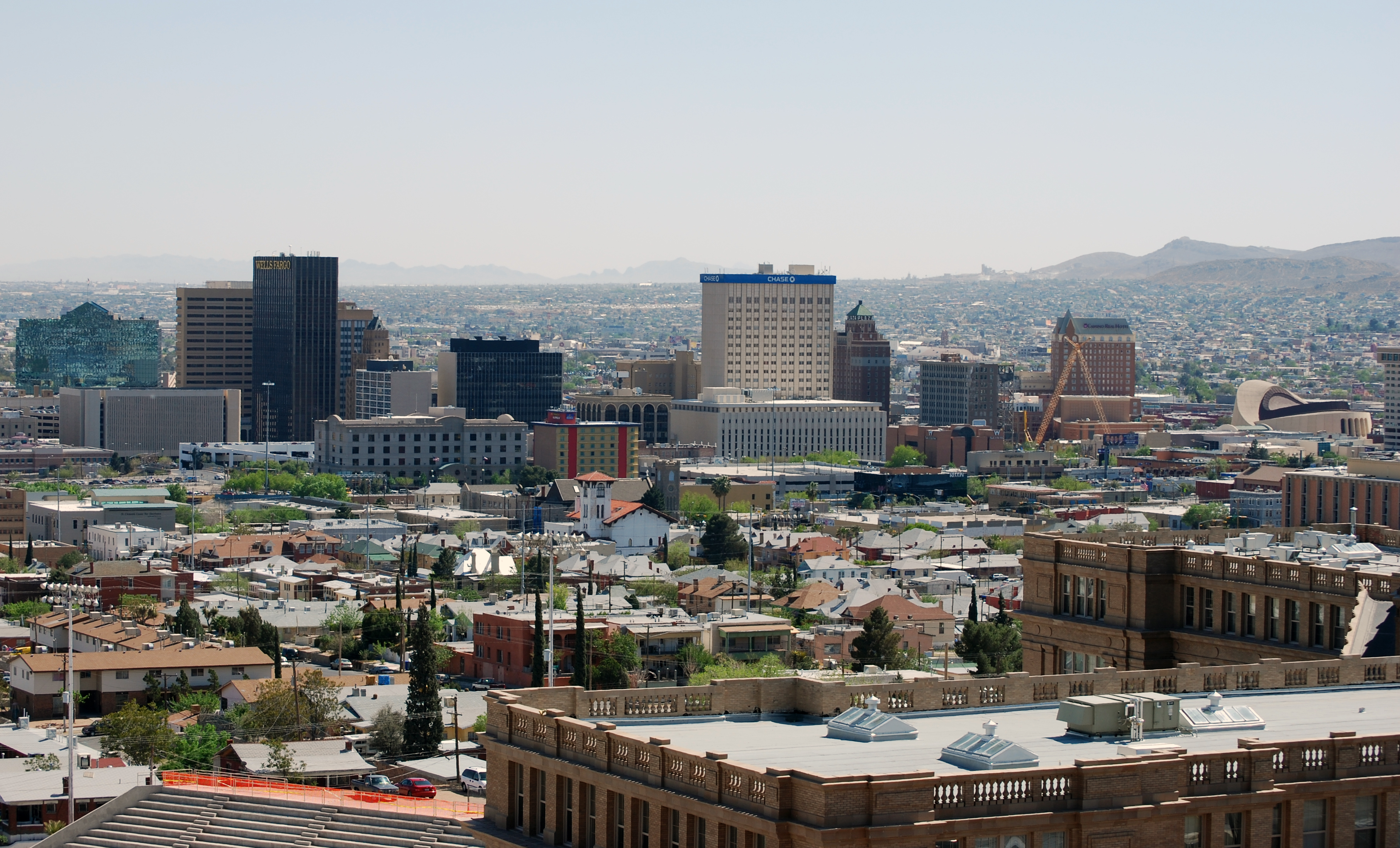
El Paso, Texas

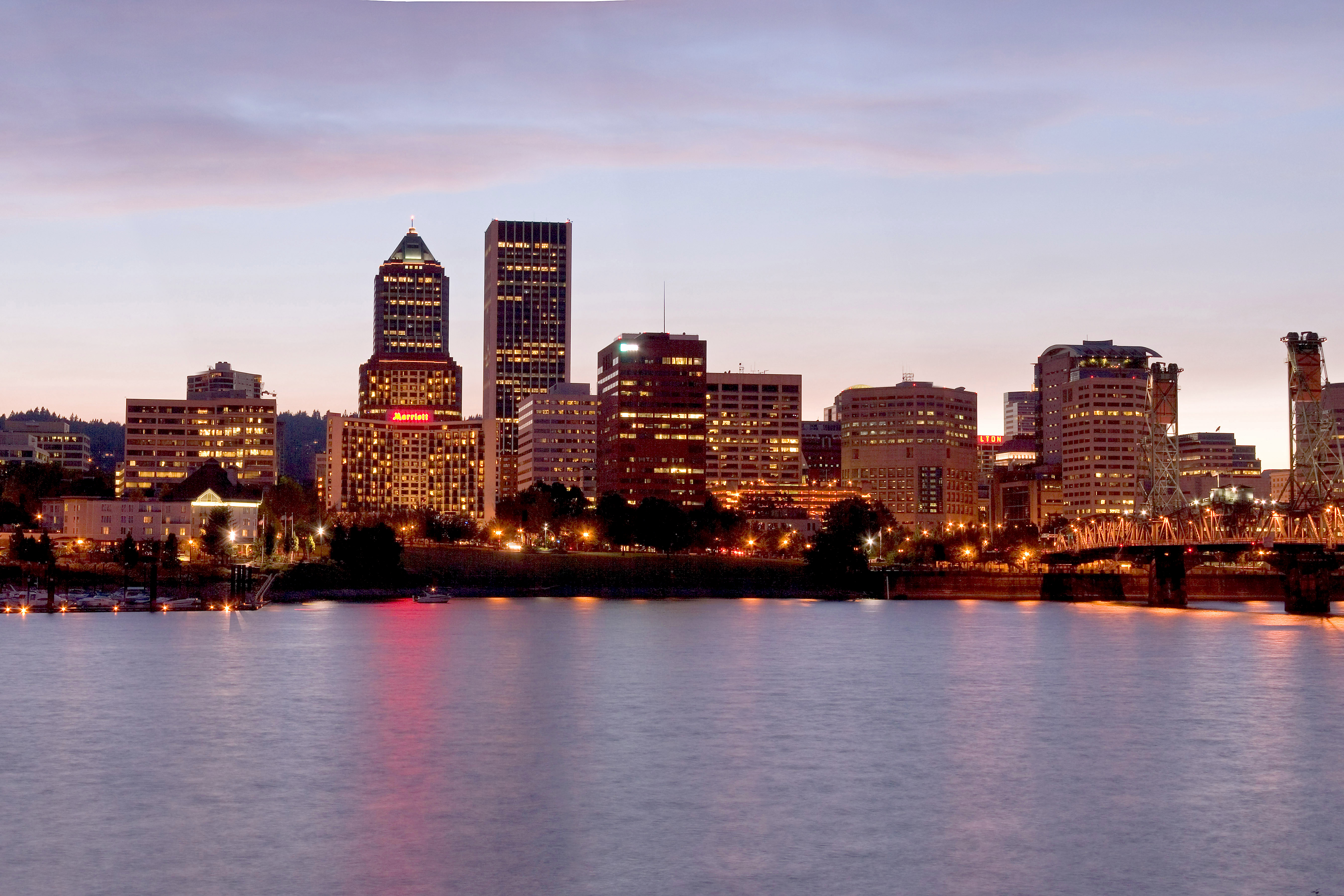
Portland, Oregon

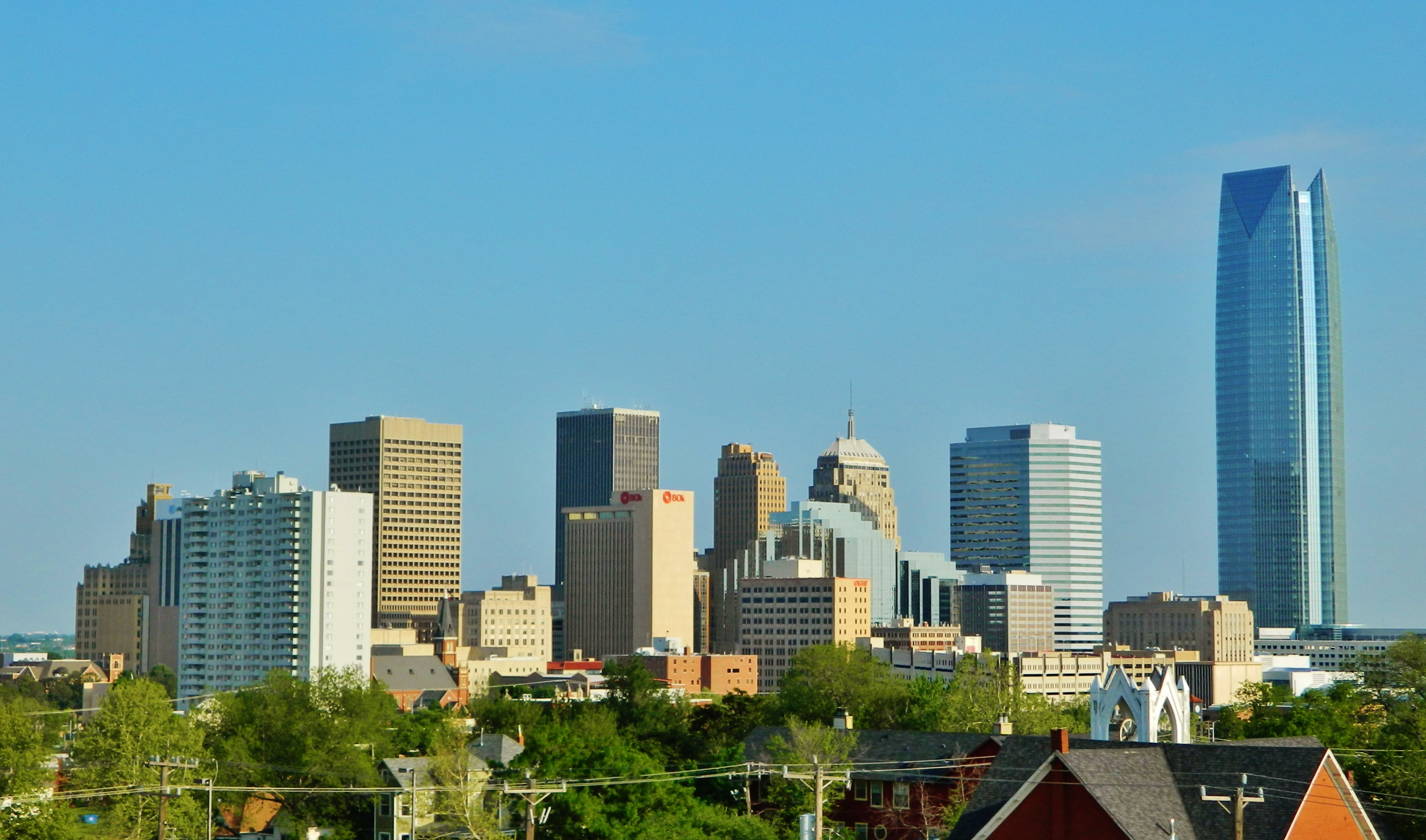
Oklahoma City, Oklahoma

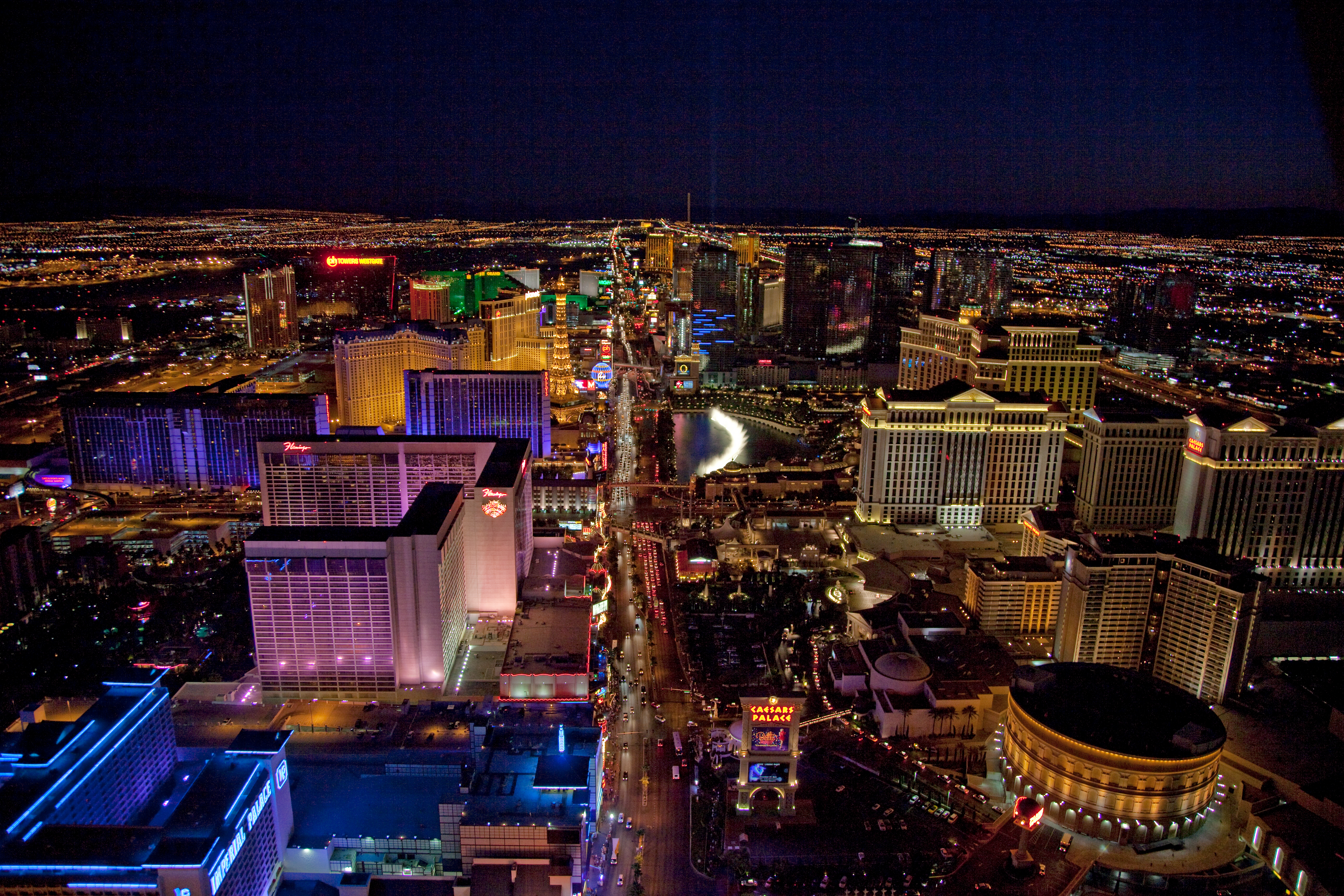
Las Vegas, Nevada

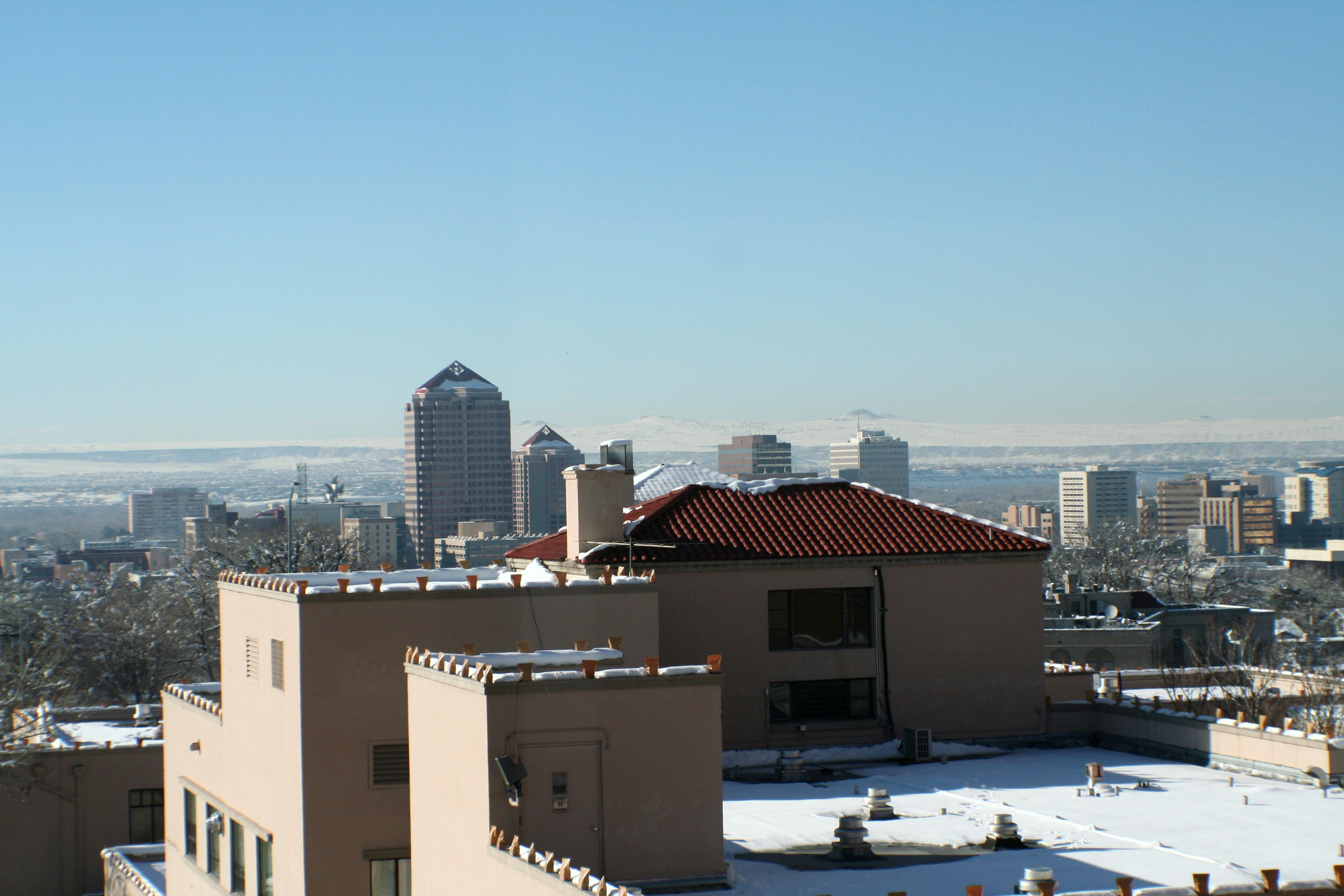
Albuquerque, New Mexico

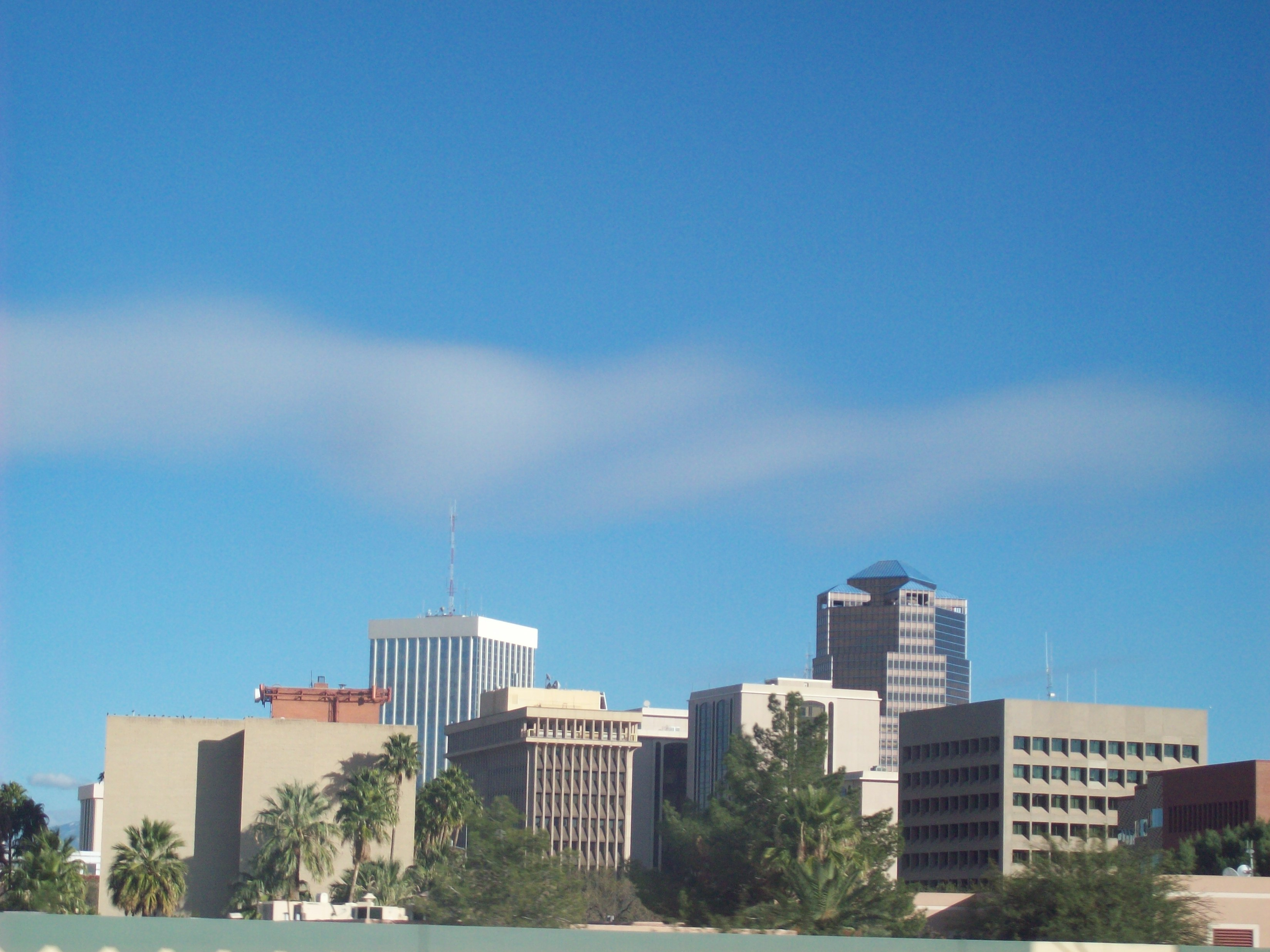
Tucson, Arizona

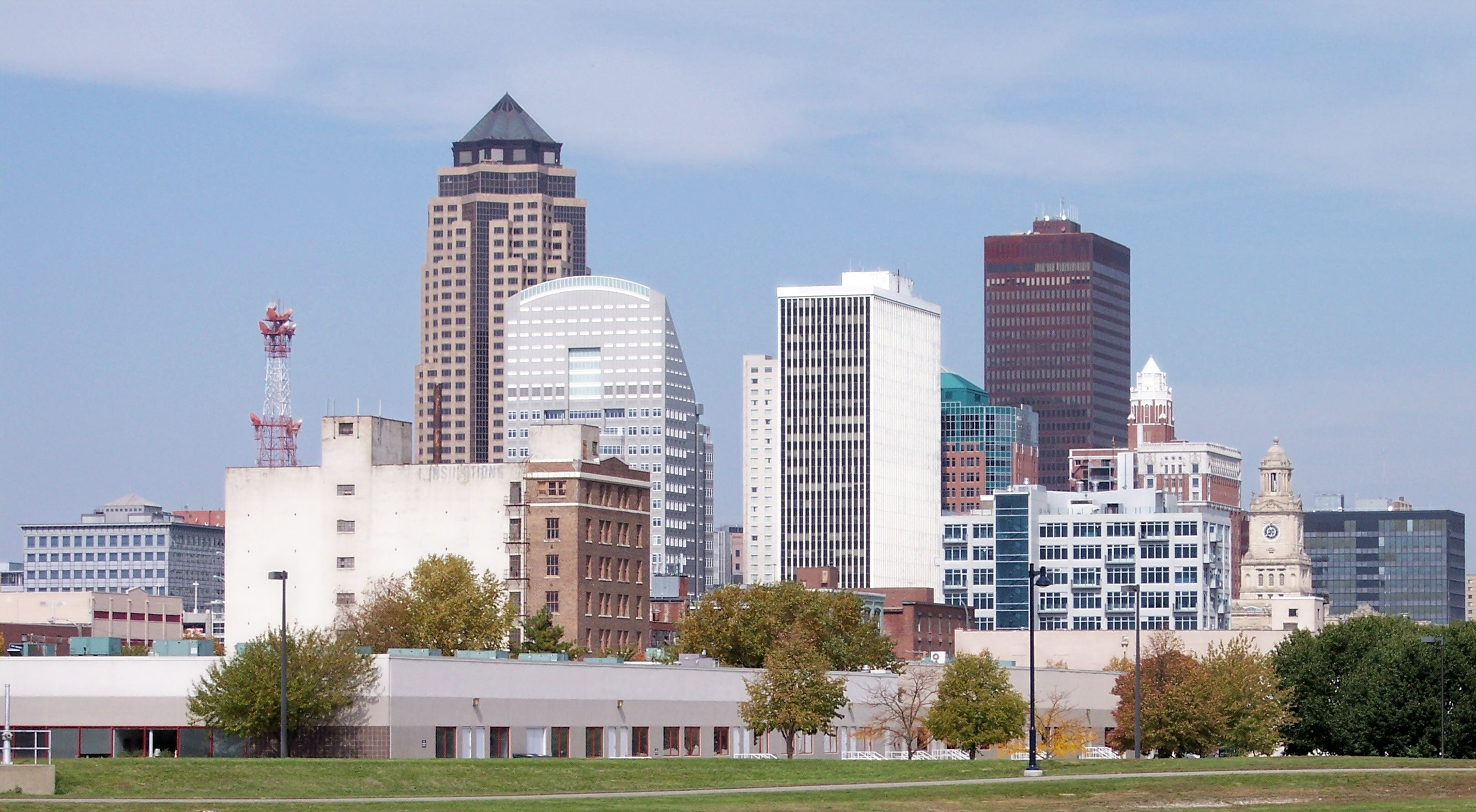
Des Moines, Iowa

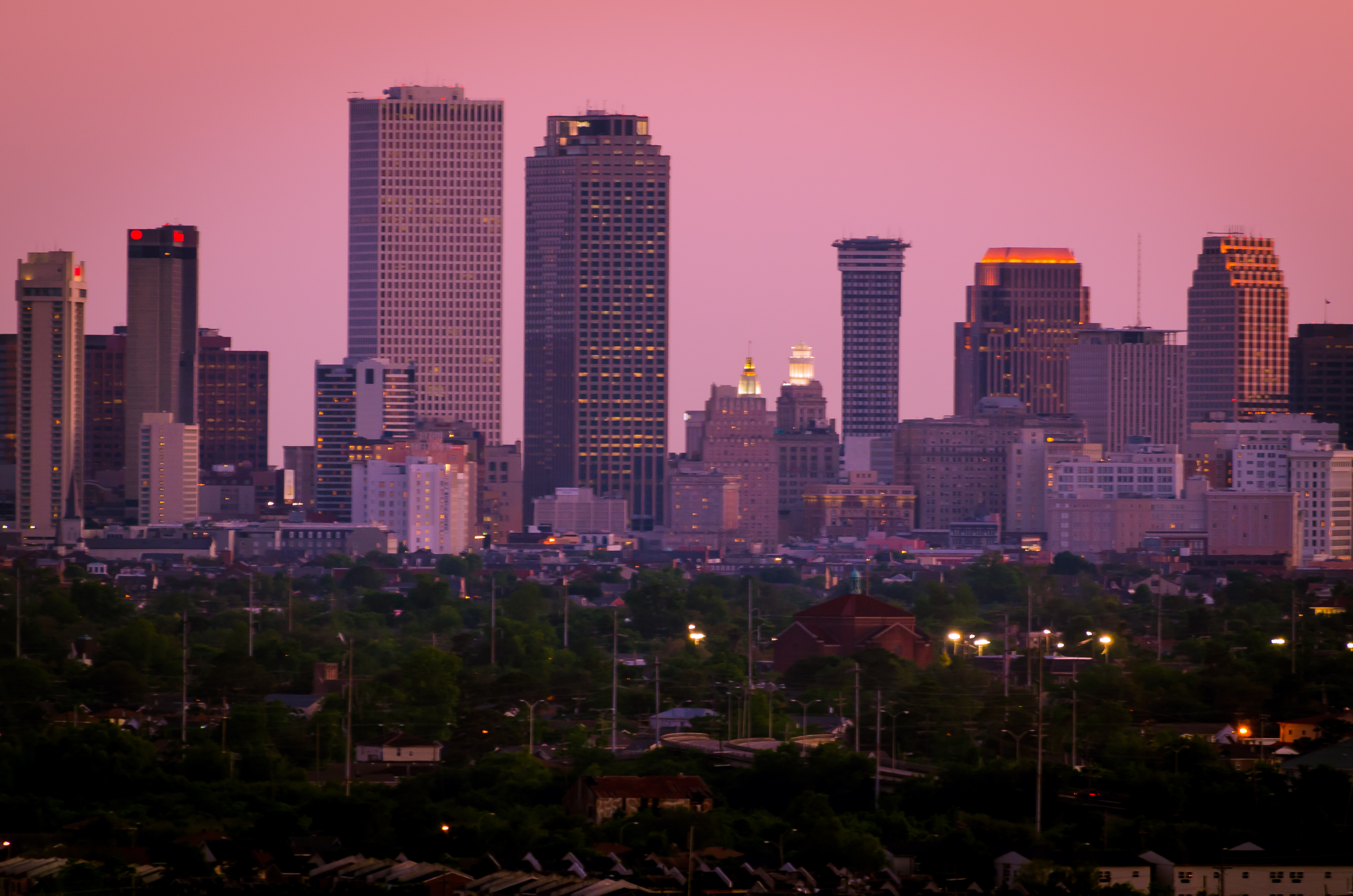
New Orleans, Louisiana
