= Mecha (tea) =

Japanese green tea

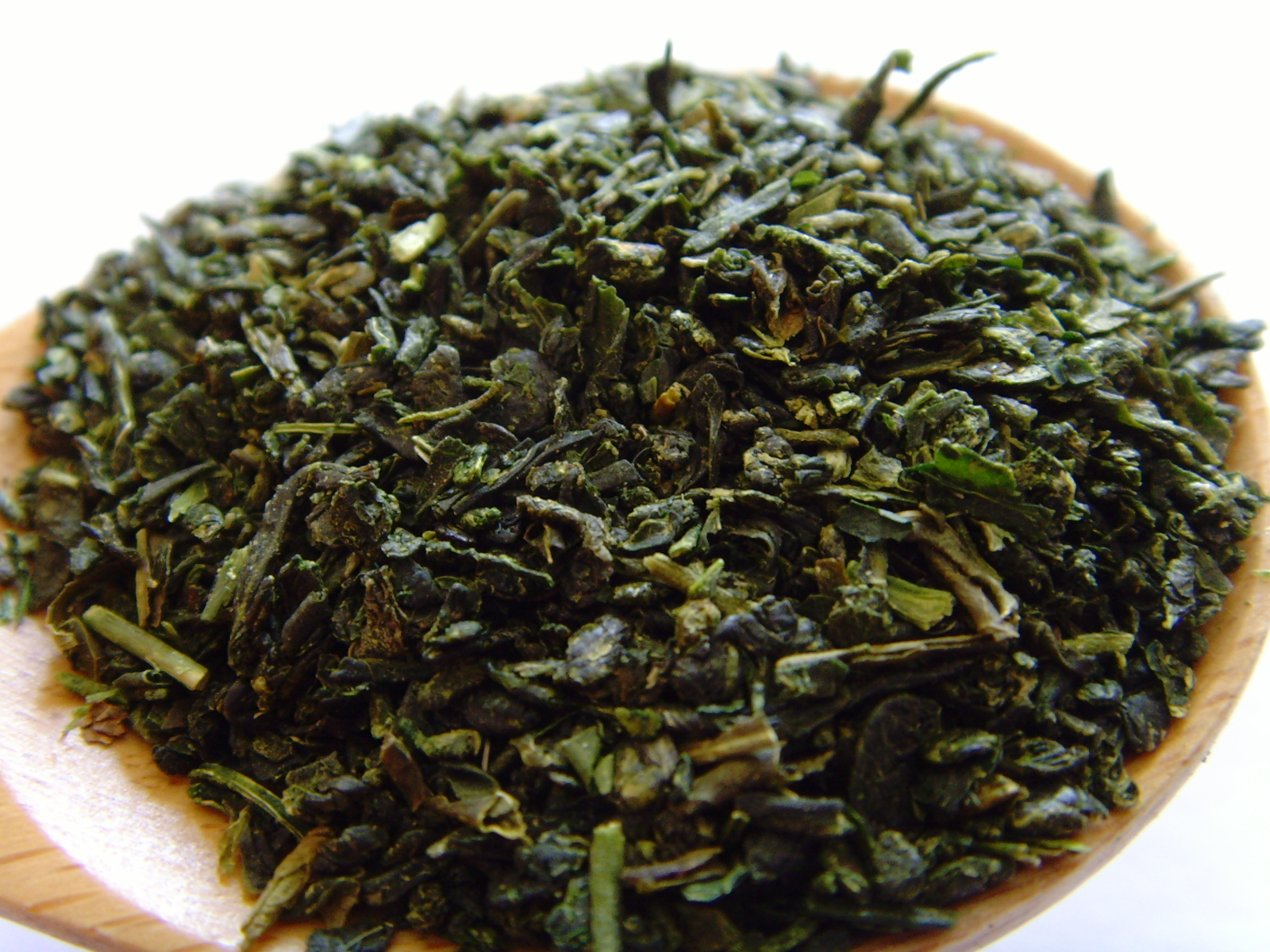
- Type: Green
- Other names: Bud Tea
- Origin: Japan
- Quick description: Popular after-dinner tea made from early leaf buds.

Mecha (芽茶) is a type of green tea. The name of mecha derives from the early leaf buds needed to make this special green tea. Mecha is harvested in spring and made as rolled leaf teas that are graded somewhere between Gyokuro and Sencha in quality. Mecha is made from a collection of leaf buds and tips of the early crops. It is produced in small quantities.

== Popularity ==
Mecha's bitter qualities make it a good tea to drink after meals to cleanse the palate.

== Flavor and aroma ==
Mecha is renowned for its depth of flavor, considerable astringency and bitter green aftertaste. The distinctive, sharp flavor and aroma of Mecha is often regarded as being as good as the best Sencha. The best Mecha produces an aromatic tea with a clear, soft yellow appearance.

== See also ==
- List of Japanese green teas
