= Maka-Maka (manga) =

Japanese manga series

- The cover of the first volume of Maka-Maka
- Genre: Yuri
- Manga
- Written by: Torajirō Kishi
- Published by: Jive
- English publisher: NA: Media Blasters
- Magazine: Pent-Japan Special (Bunkasha)
- Original run: 2003 – 2005
- Volumes: 2
- icon

Maka-Maka is a Japanese adult manga series written and illustrated by manga author Torajirō Kishi. The manga was serialized in Bunkasha's adult magazine Pent-Japan Special, and released in two bound volumes by Jive. The manga has been licensed for distribution in North America by Media Blasters, in Germany by Panini, and in France by Delcourt.

== Character backgrounds ==
Nene
Nene is a cute, well-endowed girl raised from a rich family and was spoiled as a child, but she doesn't let her looks or her affluency affect her personality. The daughter of a successful banker, she has no trouble attracting people due to her good looks and her friendly personality. Although she makes male friends easily and has many of them, she has difficulty trusting men outside of relationships due to an experience when she asked an upperclassman to view her sketches. Instead of viewing the work that she had invested her time into creating, her upperclassman ignored them and came onto her. She explains that although she had planned to have sex with him during their time together, she really wanted her work to be viewed, analyzed and possibly appreciated.
Nene is outwardly needier than Jun and has a great need for human contact. She tends to be laid-back and never really seeks perfection accepting anything that barely meets her line of standards; due to this personality trait, she has difficulty overcoming her problems and often needs the support of someone else (mostly, if not always, Jun) to get through them. She expresses her individuality through designing and making clothes. Nene's initial desire for making clothes came from the fact that she originally had trouble finding clothes that fit her due to her large boobs. She attends university classes regularly, but may fall asleep in them due to her low stamina. Her low stamina may also be the reason why she enjoys eating. Nene seeks solace within Jun due to her strong personality and independence, qualities she feels that she lacks and might not ever have.
Nene's feelings about sex are relatively simple. She enjoys having it since it feels right and it's a way for her to temporarily forget about her troubles and issues. This ties in with the fact that she needs someone else to help her get through whatever is bothering her.
Jun
Jun is the youngest child of a family with two boys and three girls. Because she was the youngest of a relatively large family, her father was a salaryman and she was often picked on by both her siblings and her peers, she started to gain an independent, cocky and self-assured personality. She often told herself, "The idiots are just jealous because I'm a genius." Jun began smoking, attending nightclubs and having sex at a young age since it made her feel more like an artist and gave her a sense of self-worth. Although some of the activities she engaged in would be considered "degrading" by most, she feels that as long as doing those activities gives her that sense of self-worth she would continue to do them. Like Nene, she has difficulty trusting people, but unlike Nene, this includes both men and women because she never really had anyone to confide in. Jun will continue to do whatever it takes to maintain the image of what she sees an artist should be.
As mentioned above, Jun is very independent and self-assured, meaning that she has much less doubt than Nene. However, due to her fear of ridicule and failure, she's very nitpicky and will agonize over the smallest of details. She has university classes as well, but she doesn't really attend them due to both her lack of interest in attending and the fact that she is a late sleeper. She spends most of her time either hanging out with Nene, other friends or visiting clubs. Jun is relatively thin because she smokes, drinks coffee regularly and doesn't eat properly (she doesn't care what she eats as long as it fills her up and she has a penchant for junk food). She admires Nene due to her passion about making clothes and the fact that she can take her greatest shortcomings, use them as her greatest asset and come off as an optimist at the same time.
Jun's feelings about sex are also relatively straightforward. While she enjoys the pleasure it brings and the mood it sets, she enjoys the fact that she can have the control of making someone else feel more good. Her first sexual encounter also made her feel more like an artist than anything else to that point.

== Manga ==
No.	Japanese release date	Japanese ISBN
1	19 December 2003	978-4-902314-09-0
2	February 2005	978-4-861760-83-9

== Reception ==
A scanlation of the series was reviewed by The Comics Journal in 2006. Eros Comix did not license it because Eros felt that Maka-Maka did not get explicit enough early in the work. Erica Friedman of Yuricon affirms that "Love Sex Communication" is a "major theme" throughout the manga, though also criticized the male characters in the manga as all being "raging asshole[s]". She has praised the English translations and production of the English volumes. Nicholas Demay felt that the inclusion of the sex scenes was organic, arising logically from the experiences of Nene and Jun, but criticised the shiny, latex-like appearance of the girls' skin and the use of screentone as backgrounds. Jason Thompson described it as "a rare pleasure", contrasting it to other yuri about "12-year-old girls holding hands" and to other manga depicting "adult relationships" which portrayed "either emotionally heavy angst or extra-drippy porn".
