= Houston's First Sit-in March 4, 1960 =

Protest in Houston, Texas, US

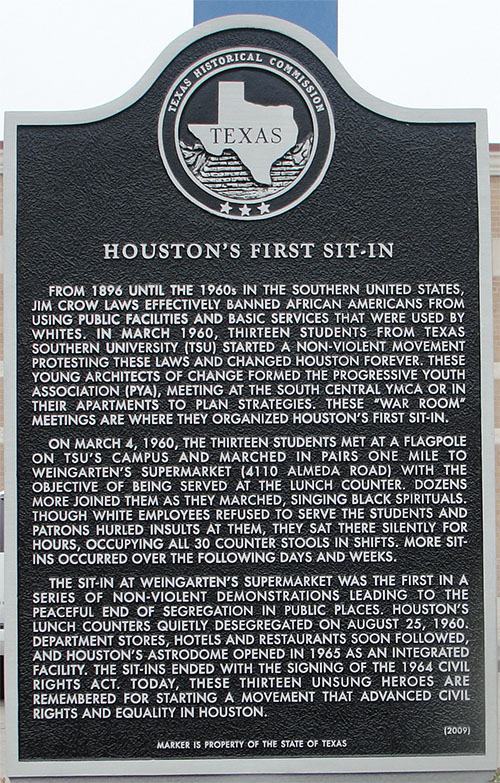
This is a Texas Historical Marker dedicated to the Texas Southern University students who led Houston's first sit-in on March 4, 1960 at the Weingarten's grocery store lunch counter in Houston, Texas. A U.S. Post Office now sits at that location. The marker sits in the front of the post office. The photo was taken by journalist and journalism professor Serbino Sandifer-Walker, who worked for two years with many stakeholders to have the marker dedicated to the TSU students.

Houston's first sit-in was held March 4, 1960 at the Weingarten's grocery store lunch counter located at 4110 Almeda Road in Houston, Texas. This sit-in was a nonviolent, direct action protest led by more than a dozen Texas Southern University students. The sit-in was organized to protest Houston's legal segregation laws. The students met on Texas Southern University's campus and the YMCA located on Wheeler Street to organize the sit-in. They called their meetings 'war room' sessions. In these sessions, the students strategized like a military unit on how they would dismantle Houston's disenfranchisement laws. They believed that their peaceful approach was a tactic that would break Houston's discriminatory practices. It worked. The students called themselves the Progressive Youth Association (PYA). PYA was formed to address the social, political and economic issues that African-Americans faced in Houston. The Houston collegians were inspired by students at North Carolina Agricultural and Technical State University, who held a sit-in in Greensboro, North Carolina on February 1, 1960.

On the day of the Houston sit-in, the students met at a flag pole located at Hannah Hall on TSU's campus. They said a prayer; lined up in pairs, and begin to march to the Weingarten's lunch counter. As they marched down Wheeler Street, people along the route noticed. Others joined in the rally as the students marched down the street. Upon arriving at Weingarten's, the students went into the store and sat at the lunch counter. Eldrewey Stearns, the leader, called the police to alert them about the sit-in. It was a strategy Stearns hoped with would ensure the protest would remain peaceful. Customers and employees hurled insults at them. They were never served. However, this did not deter the students from holding sit-ins at other segregated businesses in Houston.

As a result of the students' actions, Houston leaders, black and white, met behind closed doors to discuss how to peacefully desegregate Houston. The students were unaware of the meetings. Media blackouts were held by white owned media about the students' initiatives to end racial segregation in Houston. However, not long after the students held the March 4 sit-in, Houston businesses quietly desegregated. The revolutionary actions of TSU students and others at Historically Black Colleges and Universities (HBCUs) played a role in the U.S. ultimately signing the Civil Rights Act of 1964 into law.

Fifty years later, on March 4, 2010, Serbino Sandifer-Walker, a journalism professor at the same university, organized a march with the original students, current students, city leaders, state leaders, and many others to commemorate this historic day. A U.S. post office now sits at the location. However, a Texas Historical Marker sits in the front of the facility to commemorate the courageous Texas Southern University students who led that first sit-in, which played a major role in the desegregation of Houston, Texas.
