= Makka =

Makka may refer to:

- Mecca, city and administrative center of Mecca Province, Saudi Arabia
- Fidelis Makka (born 1950), Nigerian military officer and politician
- Ioulia Makka (born 1983), Greek chess player
- Makka Kleist (born 1951), Greenlandic actress
- Makka Sagaipova (born 1987), Chechen singer

== See also ==
- Macca (disambiguation)
- Makah (disambiguation)
- Maka (disambiguation)
