= Maka Jiba =

- Died: c. 1764
- Occupation: Political leader
- Known for: Ruler of Bundu

Maka Jiba (died 1764) was the ruler of Bundu in West Africa between around 1720 and 1764 which at the time was part of Guinea (region).

Maka Jiba regained power in Bundu for his Sissibe clan in 1720 at the end of a protracted internal conflict. Bundu successfully fought off an attack from Futa Toro between 1747 and 1751. Maka Jiba initiated an inconclusive war against the Bambuk town of Farabana in the Falémé River valley, with no definite result during his lifetime. He died in 1764.

Maka Jiba was the maternal cousin of Karamokho Alfa, who launched a successful jihad in Fouta Djallon. Both men studied in Fugumba under the famous scholar Tierno Samba. However, there are no records of Bundu participation in the jihad, perhaps because of the internal troubles in Bundu at that time, or perhaps because Maka Jiba was not greatly interested in the cause.
