= Austria–United States relations =

- Austria: United States

Diplomatic mission
- Embassy of Austria, Washington, D.C.: Embassy of the United States, Vienna

Envoy
- Ambassador Petra Schneebauer: Ambassador Arthur Fisher

Austria and the United States are geopolitical and commercial trade partners. The U.S. Embassy in Austria is located in Vienna. Since 2025, the United States Ambassador to Austria is Arthur Fisher. The Austrian Embassy in the U.S. is located in Washington, D.C., and is led by Ambassador Petra Schneebauer.

Austria first recognized the United States in 1797, and formal diplomatic relations were established between the Austrian Empire and the U.S. in 1838. Relations were interrupted by World War I, as Austria-Hungary fought opposite of the U.S., and again during World War II following the Anschluss. Ties resumed strongly after 1945 as the United States played an essential role in Austria's postwar reconstruction, including through the Marshall Plan and Austrian State Treaty. Since then, the two countries have maintained close relations, cooperating on educational exchange, science and technology, trade, and cultural diplomacy.

== History ==
=== 18th and 19th centuries ===
The Archduchy of Austria never held any colonies in the Americas. Nevertheless, a few Austrians did settle in what would become the United States prior to the 19th century, including a group of fifty families from Salzburg who were exiled for being Lutherans in predominantly Catholic Austria. The Salzburg Protestants established their own community in Ebenezer, Georgia, in 1734.

Austria stayed neutral during the American Revolutionary War. It joined the First League of Armed Neutrality, a league of European states organized by Catherine the Great of the Russian Empire during the war to protect neutral shipping, which was often under the threat of being seized or interrupted by the Royal Navy. Austria, the epicenter of the Habsburg monarchy, was initially reluctant to support the American Revolution, given that the goal of the revolution was to liberate a group of colonies from the tyrannical rule of a foreign monarch. The Continental Congress had tried to establish diplomatic relations in 1777 by sending William Lee to Vienna, but the Austrian government did not officially receive him.

Austria officially recognized the United States as an independent country in 1797 when Conrad Frederick Wagner was accepted as U.S. Consul at Trieste. U.S. diplomats to Austria subsequently served in the Habsburg-held cities of Trieste and Venice before an American consulate was established in Vienna on October 10, 1829. This was followed by the establishment of a U.S. legation in Vienna headed by Henry A.P. Muhlenberg in 1838, with the elevation to embassy status occurring in 1902. The United States and the Austrian Empire signed a treaty regarding commerce and navigation in 1829. An Austrian legation headed by Baron de Mareschal arrived in Washington, D.C., in 1838.

Serious strains occurred in the relations between the two countries as a result of the Revolutions of 1848. Professor Stephen Tuffnell states:

In its frequent and blundering breaches of etiquette with the Habsburgs, American domestic politics were, as ever, catalytic. Thus, as national-separatist revolutions broke open across the European continent in 1848, ebullient support of Lajos Kossuth and the Hungarian 48ers in the United States drove Washington and Vienna into conflict. Pro-Hungarian fervour in the Senate and Democratic press, stoked by Lewis Cass; State Department flirtation with the recognition of Hungarian independence in the Taylor and Fillmore Presidencies; and, finally, the latter's 1851 'rescue' of Kossuth from the Ottoman Empire on board the USS Mississippi precipitated a breach in relations. Only the death of Daniel Webster, a major opponent of reconciliation, averted the crisis.

From around the 1870s until the outbreak of World War I in 1914, Austrians emigrated in large numbers to the U.S. Over two million people from Austria-Hungary immigrated to the United States throughout the 19th century, though because of the empire's multi-ethnic status, it is difficult to determine how many of these immigrants were ethnic Austrians. Over 275,000 Austrian Americans lived in the United States by 1900. Austria-Hungary was also one of six countries to send more than a million immigrants to the U.S. within a single decade, arriving at roughly two million between 1900 and 1909 alone. Austrian Americans settled primarily in New York, California, Pennsylvania, Florida, New Jersey, and various Midwestern states like Ohio and Illinois. Over 60% of these immigrants came from Burgenland.

Both Austria-Hungary and the United States were part of the Eight-Nation Alliance that intervened in the Boxer Rebellion in China from 1899 to 1901.

=== World War I and World War II ===
In 1917, the United States declared war on the Austro-Hungarian Empire alongside the German Empire after being drawn into World War I. The war caused diplomatic relations between the United States and Austria-Hungary to be terminated on April 8, 1917, and caused a dramatic decrease in Austrian immigration to the United States.

The Treaty of Saint-Germain-en-Laye, negotiated between the Allies and Austria following the war, officially dissolved the Austro-Hungarian Empire and created the First Austrian Republic. The United States never ratified the Treaty of Saint-Germaine-en-Laye. Instead, the United States negotiated its own peace treaty with Austria in 1921. The United States officially recognized the independence of the First Austrian Republic on August 24, 1921.

Nazi Germany annexed the First Austrian Republic in March 1938 in an event known as the Anschluss. The United States closed its legation to Austria on April 30, 1938. During World War II, American prisoners of war were among Allied POWs held in the Stalag XVII-A, Stalag XVII-B, Stalag 317/XVIII-C and Stalag 398 German POW camps operated in German-annexed Austria, and American prisoners were also noted in subcamps of the Mauthausen concentration camp in Amstetten and Melk.

=== 1945–present ===
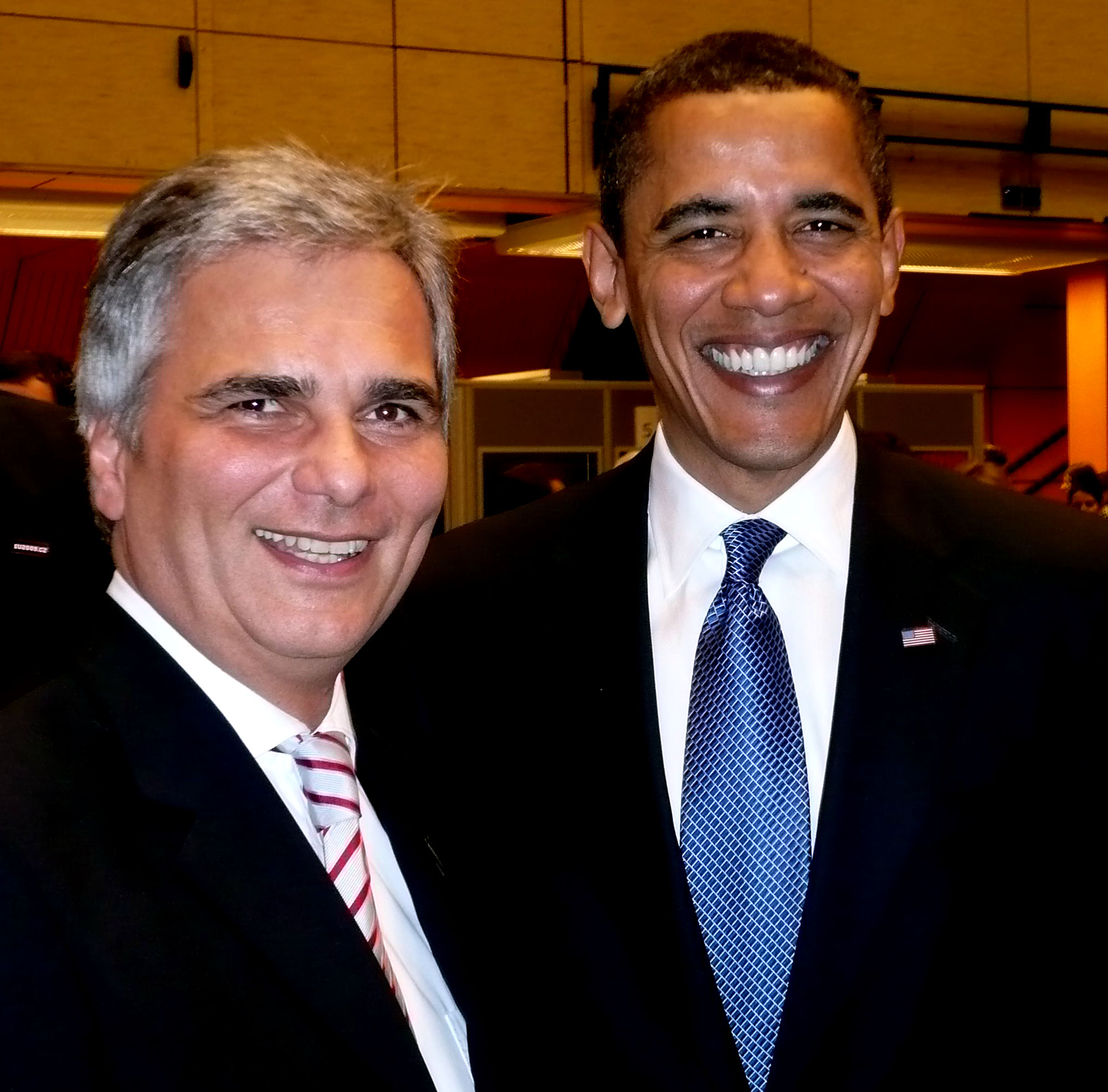
U.S. President Barack Obama and Austrian Chancellor Werner Faymann in 2009

U.S. Secretary of State Antony Blinken meeting with Austrian President Alexander Van der Bellen in 2024

The U.S. played an important role in Austria's reconstruction after World War II. After the war, the four Allied powers divided Austria into occupation zones, which were administered jointly through an Allied Council. The United States channeled significant aid to Austria through the Marshall Plan, which Austria joined in 1948 and which ultimately provided $962 million in support. This support contributed to the 1955 Austrian State Treaty, which ended the occupation and established the modern Republic of Austria as a free and neutral state.

Vienna has frequently been chosen as the venue of key superpower summit meetings, like the Vienna Summit in June 1961 between U.S. President John F. Kennedy and Soviet Premier Nikita Khrushchev, as well as the SALT II agreement in June 1979 between U.S. President Jimmy Carter and Soviet General Secretary Leonid Brezhnev.

In February 1984, Austrian president Rudolf Kirchschläger paid a state visit to the United States. It was the first state visit of an Austrian president to the United States.

In September 1995, U.S. President Bill Clinton invited the President of Austria, Thomas Klestil, for a working visit to Washington, D.C., which took place on October 19. Although Austria is not a part of NATO, U.S. and Austrian troops fought side by side during the NATO intervention in Bosnia and Herzegovina and in the Kosovo War. Both the United States and Austria were involved in the War in Afghanistan (2001–2021).

On June 21, 2006, U.S. President George W. Bush held bilateral talks with the President of Austria, Heinz Fischer, at the Hofburg Imperial Palace in Vienna, together with U.S. Secretary of State Condoleezza Rice and Foreign Minister of Austria Ursula Plassnik, shortly before a summit between the U.S. and the European Union. President Barack Obama met Chancellor Werner Faymann when Obama visited Prague on April 5, 2009.

President Donald Trump met with Chancellor Sebastian Kurz for a bilateral meeting in February 2019 with the aim of "revitalizing the bilateral relationship between the United States and exploring new avenues for transatlantic cooperation...look[ing] to address both global conflicts and those in the European neighborhood, promote economic prosperity, and strengthen energy security." On April 2, 2026, a spokesperson for the Austrian defense ministry announced that Austria has turned down U.S. requests for military overflights over its territory since the commencement of the 2026 Iran war, in accordance with its neutrality policy.

According to the 2012 U.S. Global Leadership Report, 31% of Austrians approve of U.S. leadership, with 40% disapproving and 29% uncertain.

== Resident diplomatic missions ==
of Austria in the United States

- Washington, D.C. (Embassy)
- Los Angeles (Consulate-General)
- New York City (Consulate-General)
- San Francisco (Consulate)

of the United States in Austria

- Vienna (Embassy)

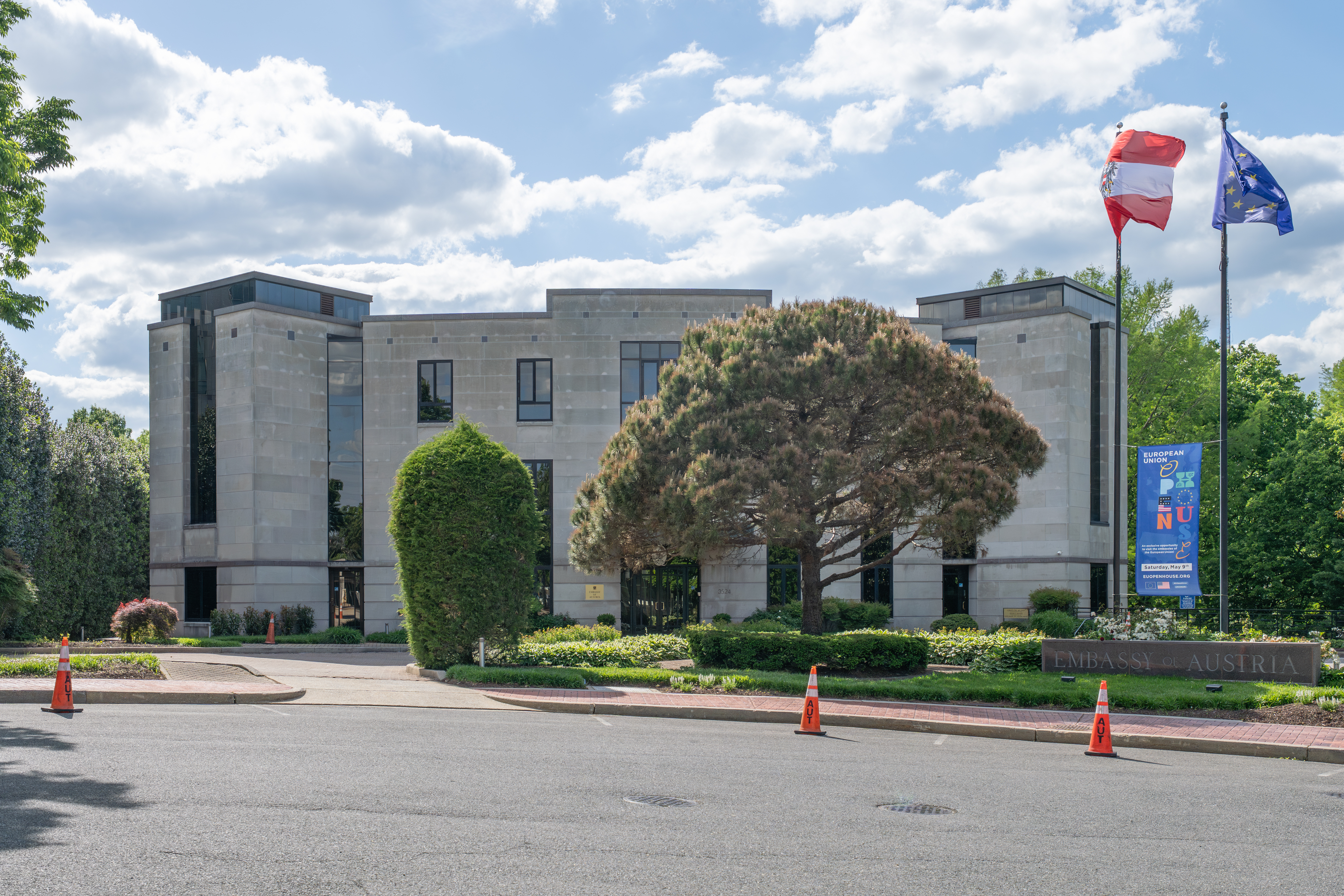
Embassy of Austria in Washington, D.C.

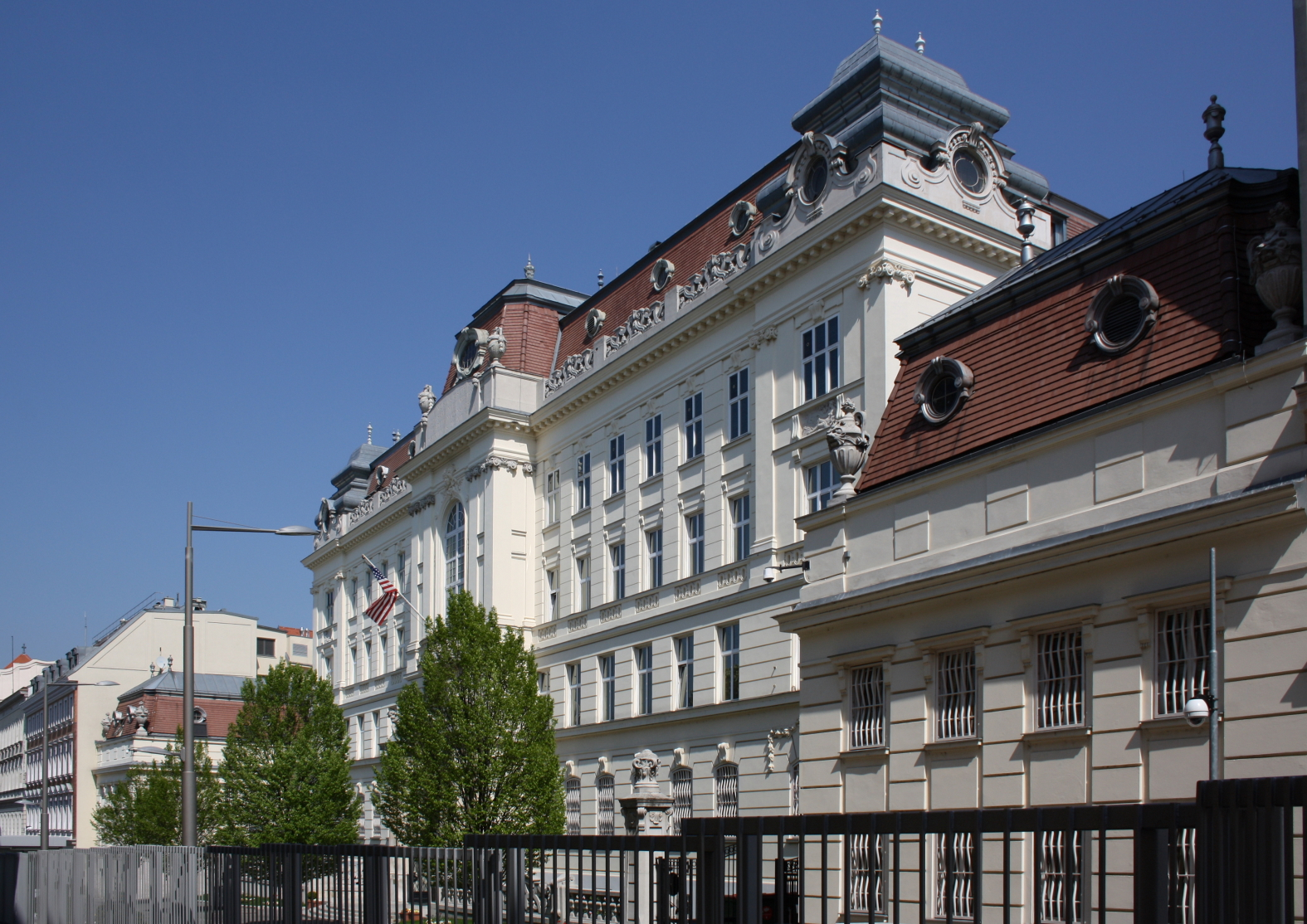
Embassy of the United States in Vienna

== See also ==
- Foreign relations of Austria
- Foreign relations of the United States
- Austria-NATO relations
- United States-EU relations
- NATO-EU relations
- Journal of Austrian-American History
- Austrian Americans
