= K.k. Akademie für Orientalische Sprachen =

Educational institution

The Kaiserlich-königliche Akademie für Orientalische Sprachen (German for 'Imperial–royal Academy for Oriental Languages'), also known as the Oriental Academy) was founded in 1754 by Empress Maria Theresa in Vienna.

== History ==
As early as 1674, on the orders of the Emperor, teaching in Turkish and Arabic began in Vienna. The Ottoman wars in Europe, as well as the economic and cultural exchanges, had made interpreters necessary, and scientific interest in the Orient awakened.

In 1754, Empress Maria Theresa founded the Oriental Academy at the suggestion of Wenzel Anton, Prince of Kaunitz-Rietberg, where Oriental Studies were taught alongside Turkish, Persian and Arabic. Most students entered the diplomatic service, where they were called "language youths" because of their age. One of the most famous students was Joseph von Hammer-Purgstall.

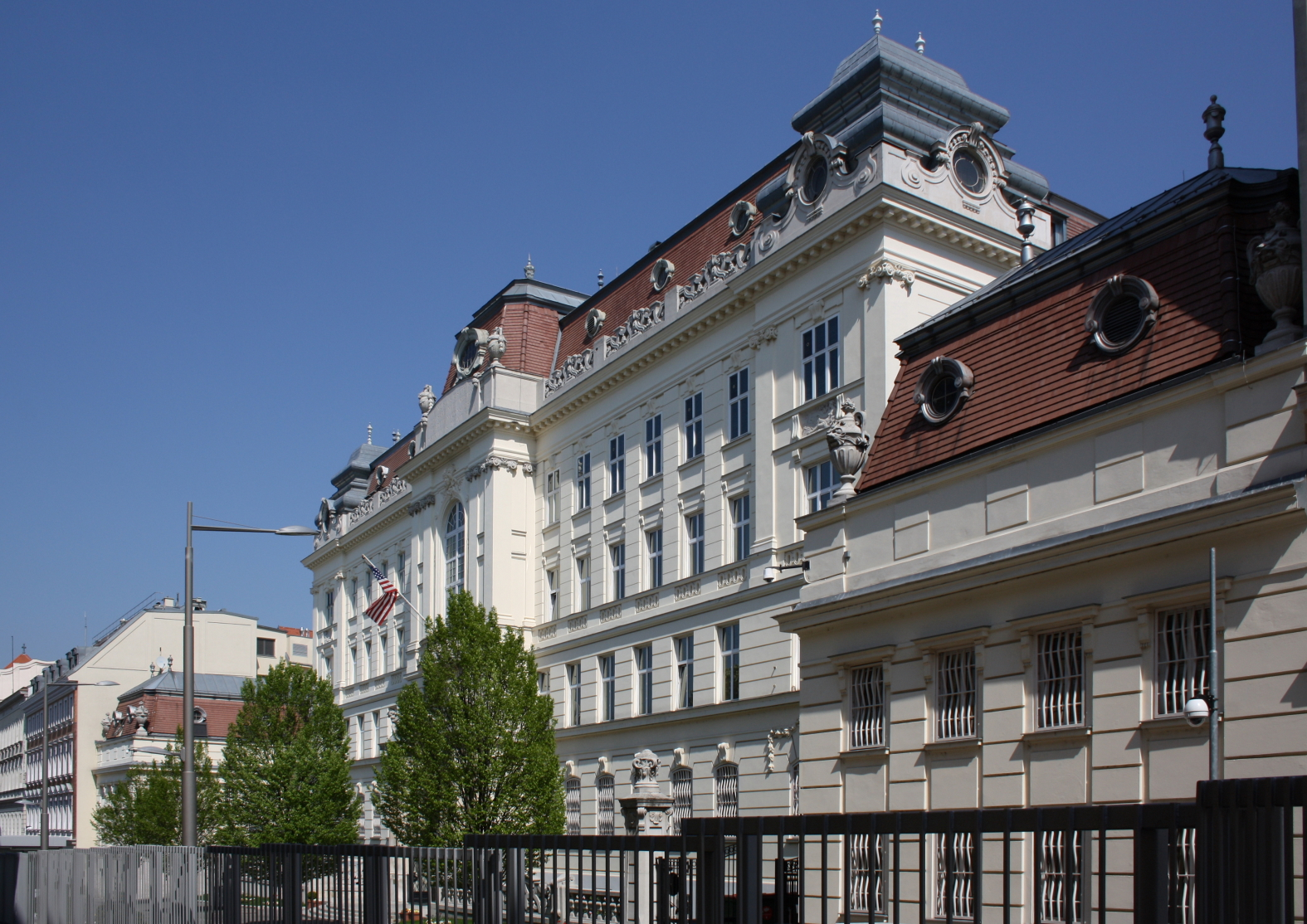
The building in which the Consular Academy (successor of the Oriental Academy) resided, now the seat of the Embassy of the United States.

At the end of the 19th century, the Oriental Academy was reorganised and renamed the Consular Academy. In 1902, the academy moved to a new building in Boltzmanngasse, built by the architect Ludwig Baumann. After the Anschluss in 1938, the activities of the academy were strongly restricted by the new National Socialist rulers.

From 1941, the building was used as a military hospital for the German army. In 1947, it was bought by the American government. Initially, it served as an American legation, and from 1951 as the Embassy of the United States.

The academy reopened in 1964 as the Diplomatic Academy of Vienna in the building of the Theresianum.
