= Embassy of the United States, Vienna =

Diplomatic mission

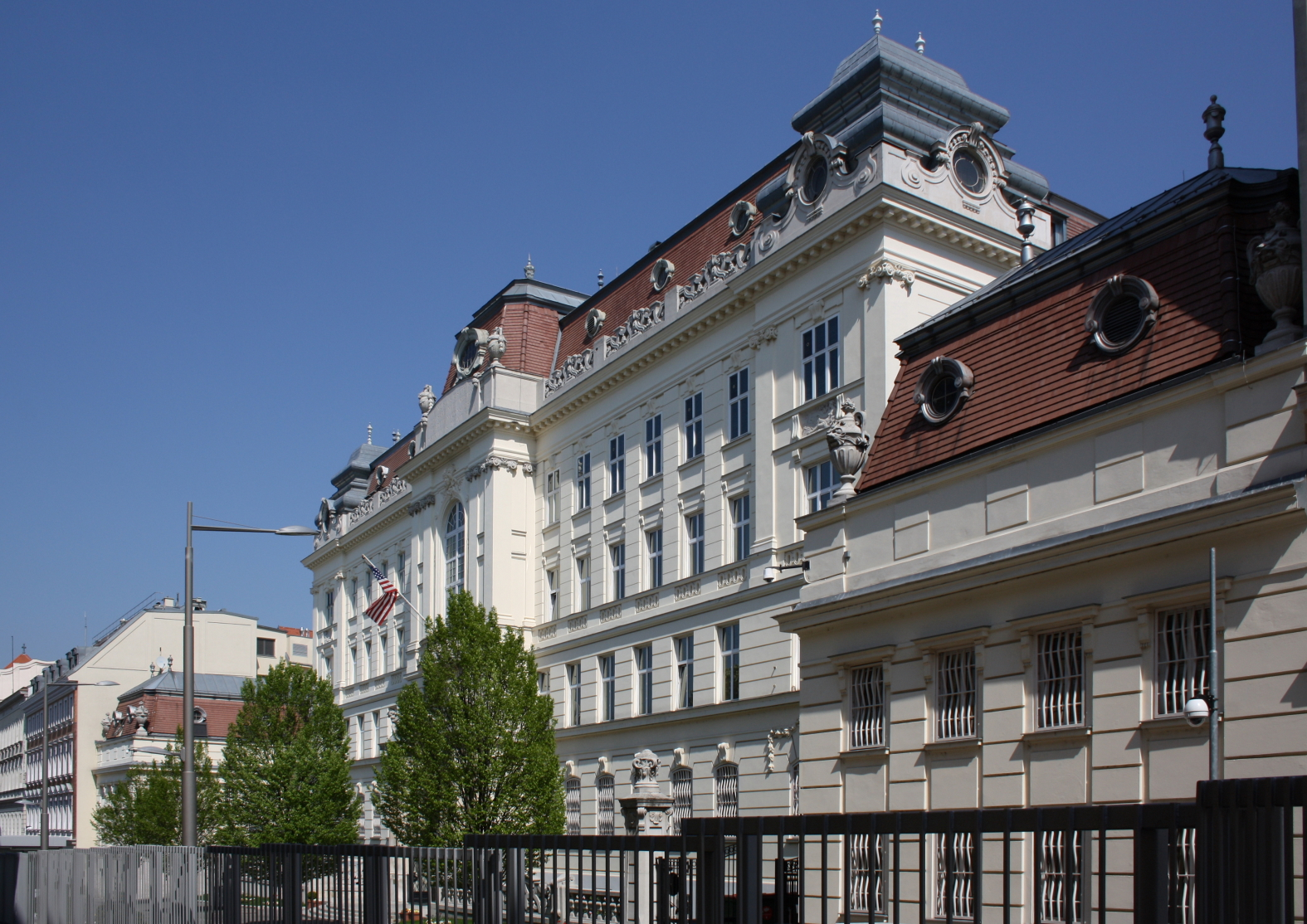
- Location: Vienna, Austria
- Address: Boltzmanngasse 16
- Coordinates: 48.222789°N 16.356223°E
- Opened: June 30, 1947; 79 years ago
- Chargé d'affaires: Kami A. Witmer
- Website: at.usembassy.gov

The Embassy of the United States of America in Vienna is the main United States diplomatic mission to Austria. Since 1947 the embassy building is located on Boltzmanngasse 16, in the Alsergrund district of Vienna.

== History ==
The United States first established diplomatic relations with Austria when Henry A. P. Muhlenberg was appointed first U.S. Envoy Extraordinary and Minister Plenipotentiary to the Austrian Empire on February 8, 1838. When according to the Compromise of 1867 the empire became the union of Austria-Hungary, the Ministers were so commissioned. The legation officially was elevated to the status of an embassy on May 14, 1902, with Robert Sanderson McCormick as first U.S. Ambassador.

When upon the American entry into World War I the United States broke off diplomatic relations with Austria-Hungary in April 1917, Spain handled the representation of U.S. interests in Vienna for the duration of the war. In 1921 the U.S. diplomatic mission reopened as a legation.

The Neo-baroque embassy building at Boltzmanngasse 16 was constructed from 1902 to 1904 according to plans designed by architect Ludwig Baumann. It was originally built as the new location of the K.k. Akademie für Orientalische Sprachen, which had been established in 1754 (the precursor of the present-day Diplomatic Academy of Vienna). The studying conditions were severely restricted after the Austrian Anschluss to Nazi Germany, and the building was temporarily used as a Wehrmacht military hospital. At the conclusion of World War II, U.S. occupation troops seized the building until 1946.

The U.S. Government finally purchased the building on June 30, 1947, at the intercession of Eleanor Lansing Dulles and with the consent of the Austrian National Council. The U.S. Mission in Austria held the status of a legation from 1947 until 1951, when it officially became an embassy, with Walter J. Donnelly as the first U.S. ambassador to serve in Vienna since Frederic Courtland Penfield departed in World War I.

The current representative of the United States in Austria is Ambassador Arthur Fisher.

== See also ==
- List of ambassadors of the United States to Austria
- Embassy of Austria, Washington, D.C.
- Vienna summit
