= Piero Sacerdoti =

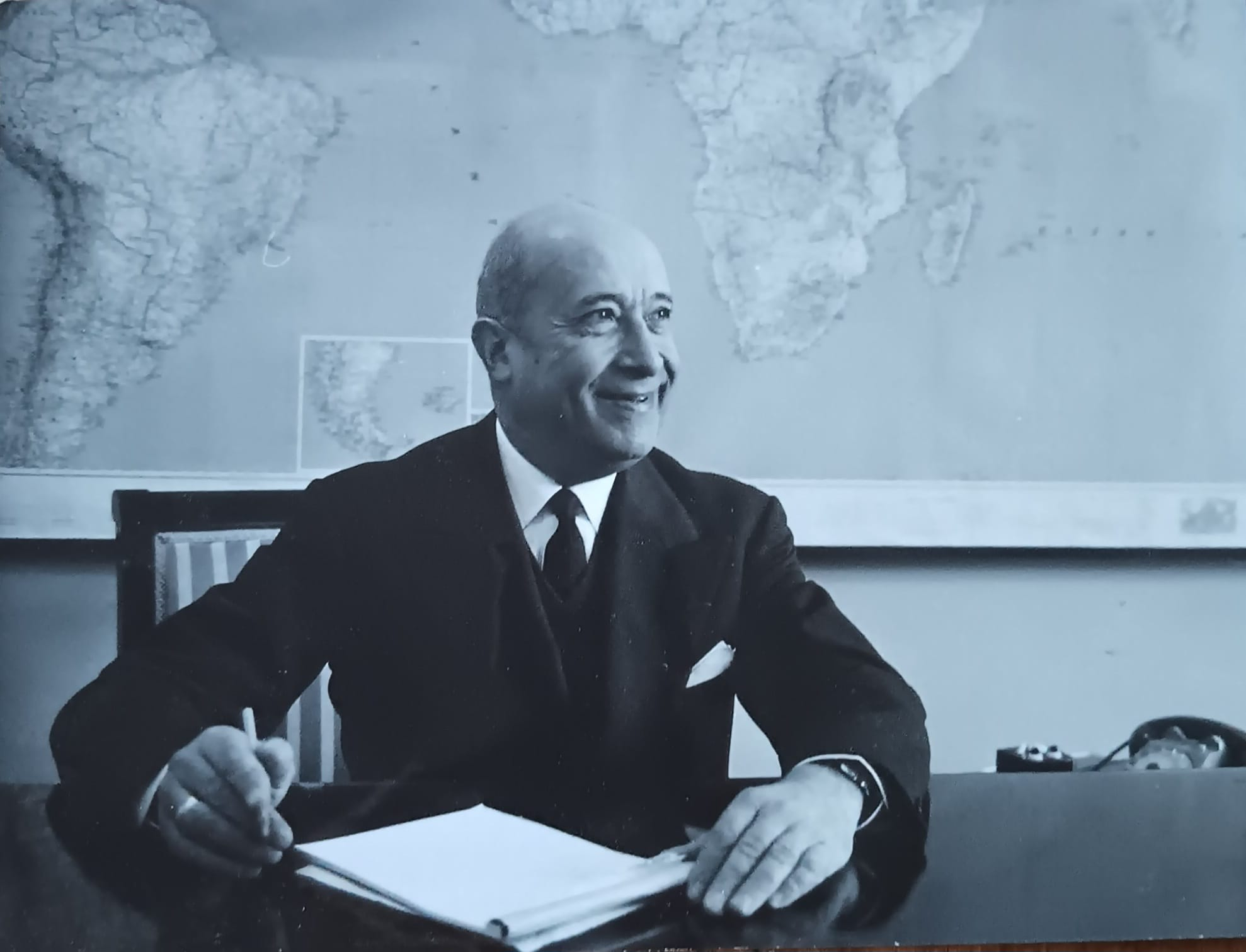
Piero Sacerdoti in his office at RAS in 1966

Piero Sacerdoti (Milan, December 6, 1905 – Saint Moritz, December 30, 1966) was an Italian insurer and university professor, general manager of Riunione Adriatica di Sicurtà in Milan from 1949 to his death.

== Early years and Education ==
Son of Ing. Nino Sacerdoti and Margherita Donati, daughter of Lazzaro Donati, after his high school graduation at Liceo Parini in Milan, he graduated cum laude at Milan Law School with a thesis on administrative law «The trade unions association in Italian law», printed by «Edizioni Lavoro» in 1928 and the following year also cum laude at the Faculty of Economics and Social Sciences of the University of Pavia.

In 1929 he passed the Law Bar examination and in 1931 he received the university habilitation to teach labor law after he published his book «The trade unions association in public German law».

== Career 1928-1940 ==
In 1928 he was recruited by Assicuratrice Italiana of RAS (Riunione Adriatica di Sicurtà) Group (later merged into Allianz) following the publication of two articles in the Italian economic newspaper Il Sole (merged in 1965 into Il Sole 24 Ore) on the German financial situation. In 1933 he was appointed deputy director of the company and was given the task to develop foreign activities in Spain, Switzerland, France and Belgium.

The CEO of RAS Arnoldo Frigessi di Rattalma appointed him in 1936 director of Protectrice–Accidents and Protectrice-Vie in Paris, both companies controlled by RAS. In 1940, following the German occupation of Paris, the direction of Protectrice group moved to Marseille, and in February 1943 to Nice, under Italian occupation, when the Germans occupied Southern France.

== Marriage and war years ==
On August 14, 1940 he married in Marseille Ilse Klein, daughter of Siegmund and Helene Klein of Cologne, Germany, from whom he had four sons; the best man was his parents' first cousin Angelo Donati.

After September 8, 1943, persecuted by the Nazis for his Jewish religion, he succeeded in taking refuge in Switzerland with his wife Ilse, his son Giorgio and his parents.

In Geneva he taught Italian administrative law in the academic program organized by Geneva's University for Italian students who had taken refuge in Switzerland after the Armistice. Other teachers were famous professors as Luigi Einaudi ( economic and financial politics), Gustavo del Vecchio ( economic politics), Francesco Carnelutti ( general theory of law), Amintore Fanfani ( economic history), Donato Donati (Italian constitutional law).

== Career 1945 - Death ==
After Paris liberation in 1945 he went back to France and took back his functions at Protectrice, which had rapidly grown in size, and was ranked in order of importance immediately after the French nationalized companies. In 1947 his activity was rewarded with the appointment to the position of General Manager. In 1949, at age 43, Sacerdoti was appointed General Manager of RAS in Milan.

At RAS he promoted the installation of new powerful computers for the management of the company and the move of its Milan's headquarters from its previous location in via Manzoni 38, to a new building in Corso Italia 23, now the Italian headquarters of Allianz Group.

=== New headquarters ===
The new building, planned by architects Giò Ponti and Piero Portaluppi, was inaugurated by the then archbishop of Milano Cardinal Montini, later Pope Paul VI on May 19, 1962.

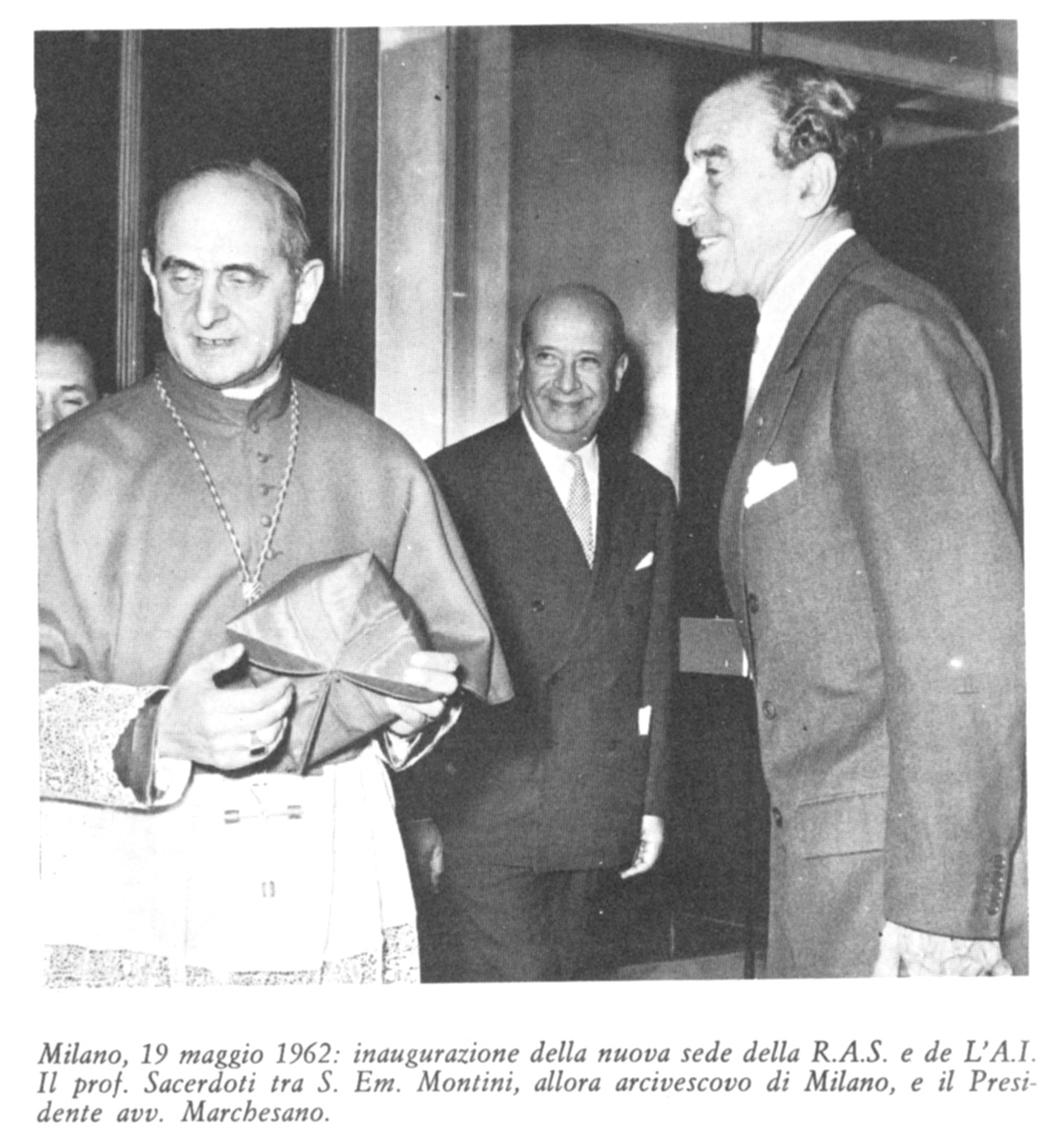

He participated to the project as a protagonist with precise directions in order to meet rigorous functionality criteria based on his management experience and extensive visits to the most modern offices of insurance companies built in Europe in those years.

In Italy the new RAS Headquarters was the first office building created after the Second World War as the headquarters of a bank or an insurance company and remains in Milan among the best examples of business architecture, together with the other buildings by Gio Ponti for the headquarters of Montecatini, Edison S.p.A., RAI and Pirelli Tower.

Piero Sacerdoti’s children requested in 2021 that the City of Milan name the square at the intersection of Via Santa Sofia and Corso Italia after their father. This square is located in front of the large former headquarters of RAS. The City Council approved on December 27, 2025 the naming of the square as "Largo Piero Sacerdoti" upon completion of the works for the S. Sofia station on Metro Line 4. The naming ceremony has taken place on June 11, 2025. The entrance of the building facing the square—now owned by the insurance company Allianz, which incorporated the RAS Group in the 1980s, and leased to the consulting firm Deloitte as its new headquarters—will bear the address Largo Piero Sacerdoti 1.

=== New insurance products ===
Among the innovations introduced by him in the company's products, worth mentioning are the global policies, which allow the cover of many risks with only one calculation of the premium, the preliminary estimate of the risk in the fire insurance, the automatic revision of the risks in the insurances for civil risks, the doubling of the life capital in case of accident, the guarantee of the payment of debts in case of death, the participation of policy holders to the profits of the life branch, the doubling in the event of death of the savings deposits at the Cassa di Risparmio delle Province Lombarde, the largest Italian savings bank, the group life insurance for the employees of the same company, the increase every three years of insured life capitals with a reduced rate, the insurance against the risk of machine assembly, the hail insurance for citrus grove.

He introduced an insurance cover for the COFINA savings plans of installment shares purchases with a multiyear commitment, created in 1956, to guarantee to heirs the completion of the investment program in case of death of the investor during the commitment period.

=== Teaching ===
In 1954 he became professor of Labor law at the Università degli Studi di Milano, an appointment that he relinquished in 1964 because of his increased professional commitments.

In 1963 Sacerdoti became head of the foreign organization of RAS group and named the company "The Company of the Five Continents", opening new offices and branches around the world and visiting all the foreign head offices and affiliated companies in little less than two years.

Under his management (1950–1965) the volume of insurance premiums of the RAS Group recorded an increase of 482% and those of RAS alone of 285%.

== Death ==
Sacerdoti died in 1966 from a sudden from a heart attack. His death was accompanied by unanimous expression of sorrow by the Italian and International insurance and financial world.

Senator Eugenio Artom, Chairman of The Italian Association of Insurance Companies (ANIA), commemorated him with these words on January 10, 1967:

He was a personality that left a sign of himself – wherever he passed – for the elevation of mind, the richness of culture, his prodigious activity, the passion – above all – that he put so vividly, so warmly in all he did, in all he created . In the field of industry, in the field of the formation of new International and super national organizations, in the creation of new tools to prepare young people to the insurance life, everywhere he left the sign of his power, while the fact that he has been able, for ten years of his life, to join to the activity of a man operating in the business field – and operating with such a wide responsibility and such a high commitment – the meditated fruitful activity of law professor in a university, fully reveals the varied capacity of this complex, vigorous personality.

=== Writings and commemoration ===
Many are Prof. Sacerdoti’s writings in the insurance field in professional journals, magazines and newspapers. Among the others we mention the study on the possibilities of insurance development in Africa (1952), the historic treatment on the «Private insurances in Lombardy» (1954), "The insurances on guarantees in the Italian insurance market" (1956), "The insurance of risks in installment sales" (1956), "The insurance of credit risks in the installment sale of equipment goods" (1958), "The insurances in the foreign commerce" (1957), the study published on Sole newspaper dedicated to "One century of insurance activity in Italian economy" (1865-1965), the articles published on the situation of the Italian insurance industry at the beginning of every year on Sole of Milan and various foreign magazines, the book published by Centro Studi Assicurativi on the insurance technique, the studies for the reform of social security in Italy and on Car Drivers Insurance.

His publications and documents related to his professional activity were donated by the family to the Fondazione Mansutti in Milan, which has catalogued them and makes them available to researchers.

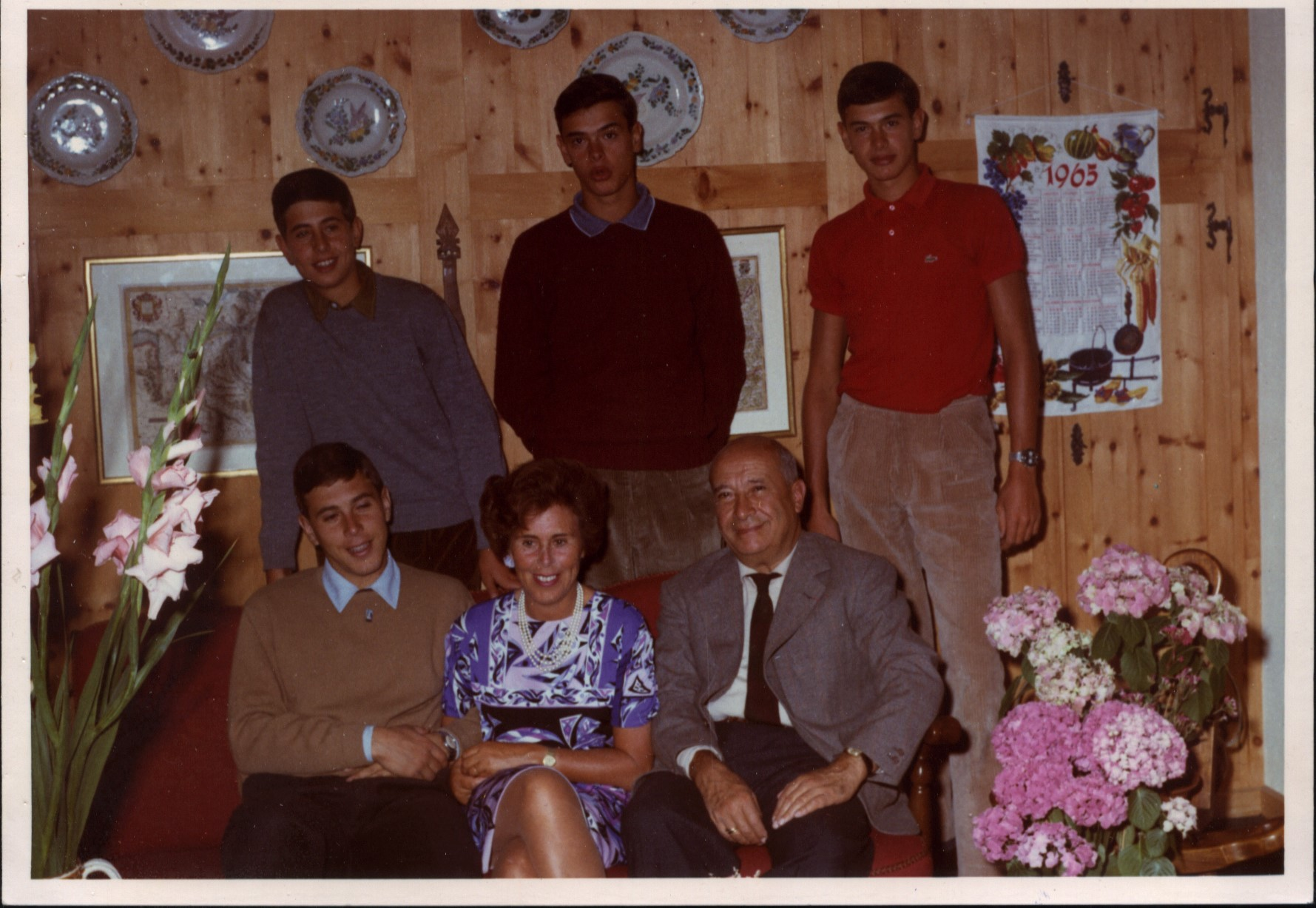
Piero Sacerdoti with his wife and children on August 14, 1965 for his twenty-fifth wedding anniversary

== Legacy ==
Sacerdoti was defined by the important French business magazine «L’Argus» "insurer of European spirit and world renown".

He was one of the most influential members of the Italian Insurance Companies Association trade group (ANIA) and of the Consulting Commission for Insurances at the Ministry of Industry, Commerce Craft. He was a strong supporter of insurance information and public relations, and was the promoter of the Insurance Study Center in Milan, called after him after his death (Centro Studi Assicurativi Piero Sacerdoti).

He was among the initiators in 1953 and most qualified representatives of the Comité Européen des Assurances (CEA), which represents the global interests of the European industry. He was an advocate of the liberalization of services and enterprises solvency.

Since 1957 he studied the risk of damage to third parties in the pacific exploitation of nuclear power and participated in 1957 to the works of OEEC (Organisation for Economic Co-operation and Development) for the preparation of an international convention, signed in 1960, to avoid legal disparities in nuclear industry insurance among the various European countries. He encouraged the creation of a nuclear insurance Italian “pool”, associated to similar foreign “pools”, to provide to the Italian nuclear industry the maximum guarantee for damages to third parties available on the international market.

In 1959 he signed the first Italian policy for insurance of nuclear damages, related to the subcritical experimental reactor of the Cagliari University.

He was concerned with the institution of a guarantee fund to compensate the victims of unknown or insolvent car drivers, but he opposed, at least at the beginning, a compulsory insurance for car drivers, fearing government interference in the private management of companies.

Concerning the retirement system, he promoted the creation of voluntary retirements plans to integrate the compulsory public retirement system.

== Honours ==
- Commendatore of the Italian Republic, 1953
- Chevalier of the Legion of Honor, 1954
- Gold medal of Milan Municipality to the memory, 1968

== Sources ==
- Giandomenico Piluso, Sacerdoti Piero, Dizionario Biografico degli Italiani, Enciclopedia Treccani, pag. 548-551, Roma, 2017
- Giorgio Sacerdoti, Piero Sacerdoti. Un uomo di pensiero e azione alla guida della Riunione Adriatica di Sicurtà. Lettere familiari e altre memorie, Hoepli, 2019, ISBN 978-88-203-9096-9
- Piero Sacerdoti, L’associazione sindacale nel diritto italiano, Roma, Edizioni del diritto del lavoro, 1928
- Piero Sacerdoti, Le associazioni sindacali nel diritto pubblico germanico, Padova, Cedam, 1931
- Piero Sacerdoti, Le Corporatisme et le regime de la production et du travail en Italie, Paris, Librairie du Recueil Sirey, 1938
- Piero Sacerdoti, Il cittadino e lo stato, corso di diritto amministrativo tenuto a Ginevra nel 1944
- Piero Sacerdoti, Le assicurazioni private nella regione Lombardia, estratto dal volume L'economia della regione Lombardia, Cariplo, 1954
- Piero Sacerdoti, La responsabilità civile per danni a terzi nell'utilizzazione pacifica dell'energia nucleare, Casa Editrice la Tribuna, Piacenza, 1958
- Piero Sacerdoti, L'atomo e il diritto, Realtà nuova, rivista dei Rotary Club d'Italia, n. 7 1958
- Piero Sacerdoti, Risarcimento obbligatorio del danno alle vittime della circolazione dei veicoli a motore, intervento al dibattito televisivo "Che ne dite?" della Televisione italiana del 6-2-1959
- Piero Sacerdoti, Il nostro programma per gli anni '60, Convegno degli Agenti Ras, Milano, 30 maggio 1962
- La Compagnia dei 5 Continenti, Riunione Adriatica di Sicurtà, 1963
- Piero Sacerdoti, Previdenza sociale e promozione del risparmio nell'economia moderna, ALDAI, Milano, 2-2-1964
- Piero Sacerdoti, Insurance in the Common Market, lecture given at the Fifth Course on the Law and Economy of the European Communities by the International Centre for Research and Documentation on the European Communities, Milano, 12 maggio 1966
- Piero Sacerdoti, L'industrie de l'assurance italienne vers l'horizon 1970, L'Argus journal international des assurances, Paris, January 15, 1967
- The Times, London, Professor Piero Sacerdoti, obituary of January 6, 1967
- La réassurance, Paris, Nécrologie de M. Piero Sacerdoti, January 1967, n. 587
- Technical Bulletin of Ras Group, issue dedicated to Piero Sacerdoti's memory, year 35, n. 2, February 1967
- Giorgio Sacerdoti, Falls wir uns nicht wiedersehen…Die Familie von Siegmund Klein zwischen Rettung und Tod, Prospero Verlag, Münster, Berlin, 2010, ISBN 978-3-941688-00-1
- Giorgio Sacerdoti, Nel caso non ci rivedessimo, una famiglia tra deportazione e salvezza 1938-1945, Archinto, 2013 ISBN 978-88-7768-643-5
- Erminio Tedeschi, Appunti per una storia, Ras: 1838-1988, Milano, Ras, giugno 1989 in occasione del 150° bilancio della Ras
