= Enrico Donati =

Italian-American Surrealist painter and sculptor

- Born: February 19, 1909; Milan, Italy
- Died: April 25, 2008 (aged 99); New York City, United States
- Known for: Painting
- Movement: Surrealism

Enrico Donati (February 19, 1909 – April 25, 2008) was an Italian-American Surrealist painter and sculptor.

== Life and work ==
Son of Federico Donati and Marianna Vita, nephew of Angelo Donati, born in Milan in 1909, Enrico Donati studied economics at the Università degli Studi, Pavia, and in 1934 moved to the USA, where he attended the New School for Social Research and the Art Students League of New York. His first one-man shows were in New York in 1942, at the New School for Social Research and the Passedoit Gallery. At this stage he was clearly drawn to Surrealism. This was reinforced by meeting André Breton and coming into contact with Marcel Duchamp and the other European Surrealists in New York at the time. A typical work of this period, St Elmo’s Fire (1944; New York, MoMA), contains strange organic formations suggestive of underwater life.

Donati was one of the organizers of the Exposition Internationale du Surréalisme held in Paris in the summer of 1947, to which he contributed a painting and two sculptures. In the late 1940s he responded to the crisis in Surrealism by going through a Constructivist phase, from which he developed a calligraphic style and drew onto melted tar, or diluted paint with turpentine. He also became associated with Spatialism, founded by Lucio Fontana. Thus began his long fascination with surface and texture, including mixing paint with dust, that culminated in the 1950s in his Moonscapes, a series that has similarities with the work of Dubuffet. The fossil became a major theme for Donati through the 1960s, and he gave new importance to color in his Fossil works, for example in Red Yellow Fossil (1964; Miami, Hills Col., see Selz, p. 19). In 1961, he was given a major retrospective at the Palais des Beaux-Arts in Brussels and frequently exhibited at group shows in the USA and elsewhere. He held a number of important teaching and advisory posts, including visiting lecturer at Yale University (1962–1972).

Enrico Donati married Claire Javal of the important Javal family and had two daughters with her.

== Death ==
Considered by some in the art world to be one of the last of the Surrealists, Enrico Donati died in his home in Manhattan on April 25, 2008, aged 99. Donati's health had been failing since involved, as a passenger, in a taxi accident in July 2007. He eventually succumbed to complications sustained from his injuries.

== Museums and collections ==
- The Museum of Modern Art, New York
- Guggenheim Museum, New York
- Whitney Museum of American Art, New York
- Washington University in St. Louis, Missouri
- Museum of Fine Art of Houston, Texas
- Boca Raton Museum of Art, Florida
- Royal Museums of Fine Arts of Belgium, Belgium
- Museum of International Center of Aesthetic Research, Turin
- Albright-Knox Art Gallery, New York
- The Detroit Institute of Art, Michigan
- University of Michigan Art Gallery, Michigan
- Baltimore Museum of Art, Maryland·Newark Museum Association, New Jersey
- Galleria Nazionale d'Arte Moderna, Rome
- Mitchener Foundation, Pennsylvania
- Massachusetts Institute of Technology, Massachusetts
- The Rockefeller Institute, New York
- Johns Hopkins Hospital, Maryland
- Yale University Art Gallery, Connecticut
- Washington Gallery of Modern Art, Washington, D.C.
- Tougaloo College, Mississippi
- Israel Museum, Israel
- University Art Museum, University of California, Berkeley
- University of Texas at Austin
- Museum of Fine Arts, Florida
- Tacoma Art Museum, Washington
- St. Paul Art Center, Minnesota
- The Lowe Museum, University of Miami, Florida
- High Museum of Art, Georgia
- Doane University, Nebraska
- Seattle Art Museum, Washington
- Weinstein Gallery, San Francisco, California
- Vassar College, New York
- Swarthmore College, Pennsylvania
- Minnesota Museum of American Art, Minnesota
- The Hirshhorn Museum and Sculpture Garden, Washington, D.C.
- Museum of Art, Florida
- Orlando Museum of Art, Florida
- Housatonic Community College, Connecticut
- Arturo Schwarz Surrealist Foundation, Italy
- Gallerie di Piazza Scala, Milan, Italy, magma bianco

== Selected solo exhibitions ==
- 2007, The Surreal World of Enrico Donati, de Young Museum, San Francisco
- 2006, Weinstein Gallery, San Francisco, California (Retrospective : 130 Selected works from the Artist's Personal Collection 1942 - 2001)
- 2004, 2005 Gallerie Les yeux fertiles, Paris
- 2000-04 Galerie Yoramgil, West Hollywood, California
- 1998 Galerie Yoramgil, West Hollywood, California (retrospective)
- 1997 Boca Raton Museum (retrospective)
- 1995-97 Maxwell Davidson Gallery, New York
- 1995-97 Horwitch Gallery, Scottsdale
- 1986, 1989, 1991, 1992, 1993 Louis Newman Galleries, Beverly Hills
- 1989 Galerie Zabriskie, Paris
- 1987 Zabriskie Gallery, New York
- 1985 Georges Fall, Paris
- 1994, 1990 Carone Gallery, Fort Lauderdale
- 1984, 1986, 1987 Gimpel & Weitzenhoffer, New York·1980 Grand Palais, FIAC, Paris
- 1980 Palm Springs Desert Museum, Palm Springs
- 1979 Osuna Gallery, Washington, D.C.
- 1979 Phillips Collection, Washington, D.C.
- 1950 Galleria del Milione, Milan 1950 Obelisco, Rome
- 1950 Paul Rosenberg Gallery, New York
- 1947 Galerie Drouant Gallery, Paris
- 1947, 1958 Syracuse University, New York
- 1945-47, 1949 Durand Ruel, New York
- 1944, 1959 Chicago Arts Club, Chicago
- 1944 G. Place Gallery, Washington, D.C.
- 1942, 1944 Passedoit Gallery, New York
- 1979 Norton Gallery, Palm Beach
- 1978 Wildenstien Art Center, Houston
- 1978 Davenport Municipal Art Gallery, Iowa
- 1978 Hunter Museum of Art, Chattanooga
- 1977 Fairweather Hardin Gallery, Chicago
- 1977 Tennessee Fine Arts Center, Nashville
- 1977 Chrysler Museum, Norfolk
- 1977, 1979, 1982 Ankrum Gallery, Los Angeles
- 1977 Minnesota Museum of Art, St. Paul
- 1965 Obelisk Gallery, Washington, D.C.
- 1964 Massachusetts Institute of Technology, Cambridge
- 1964, 1966 J.L. Hudson Gallery, Detroit
- 1962, 1963, 1966, 1968, 1970, 1972, 1974, 1976, 1980, 1982 Staempfli Gallery, New York
- 1962 Neue Gallery, Munich
- 1961 Palais des Beaux-Arts, Brussels
- 1954, 1955, 1957, 1959, 1960 Betty Parsons Gallery, New York
- 1953 Naviglio, Milan
- 1952, 1953 Cavallino, Venice
- 1952 Alexander Iolas Gallery, New York

== Selected group exhibitions ==
- 2005 Centre de Cultura Contemporania de Barcelona and Museo de Bellas Artes de Bilbao, Spain
- 2005 National Academy of Design, New York, and Phoenix Art Museum, Arizona
- 2002 Kouros Gallery, New York
- 2002 Philadelphia Museum of Art, Pennsylvania
- 2001-02 Tate Gallery, London and Metropolitan Museum of Art, New York
- 2001 Portland Art Museum, Oregon
- 2001 Cultural Center Bank of Brazil, Rio de Janeiro
- 1999-2004 Galerie Yoramgil, West Hollywood, California
- 2000 Musees de Strasbourg
- 1999 Musee National Centro de Arte Reina Solia, Madrid
- 1998 Bruce Museum, Connecticut·1997 Boca Raton Museum of Art, Florida
- 1995 Nassau County Museum of Art, New York
- 1995 Galleria d'arte Bergamo, Italy
- 1994 Hunter College Art Galleries, New York
- 1992 Isidore Ducasee Fine Arts, New York
- 1991-92 Miami International, Florida
- 1991 Musee National Centro de Arte Reina Sophia, Madrid, Spain
- 1991 Musee National d'Art Moderne, Paris, France
- 1990-91 ART/LA, Los Angeles, California
- 1990 Riva Yares Gallery, Scottsdale, Arizona·Fundacion Cultural Mapfre Vida, Madrid
- 1989-90 Las Palmas de Gran Canaria, Centro Atlantico de Arte Moderno
- 1989 Schim Kunsthalle, Frankfurt, Germany
- 1989 Palazzo Reale, Milan, Italy
- 1977 Rutgers University Art Gallery, New Brunswick, New Jersey
- 1977 Nashville Museum, Tennessee
- 1976 Meredith Long Gallery, Houston, Texas
- 1976 Ankrum Gallery, Los Angeles, California
- 1970 University of Texas, Austin
- 1964 New York World Fair
- 1964 Museum of Fine Arts, Boston, Massachusetts
- 1964 Whitney Museum, New York
- 1963 Allentown Art Museum, James A. Michener Foundation, Pennsylvania
- 1963 Columbia Museum of Art, South Carolina
- 1963 Herron Museum of Art, Indianapolis, Indiana
- 1962 Birmingham Museum of Art, Alabama
- 1961 Decorative Arts Center, New York
- 1961 Mary Washington College, Fredericksburg, Virginia
- 1961 Massachusetts Institute of Technology, Cambridge
- 1960 Walker Art Center, Minneapolis, Minnesota
- 1960 University of Colorado, Boulder
- 1960 Marton May Exhibition, St. Louis, Missouri
- 1960 Martha Jackson Gallery, New York
- 1960, 1977 Minnesota Museum of Art, St. Paul
- 1959 Michigan State University
- 1959 De Cordova & Dana Museum, Massachusetts
- 1959 American Federation of Arts, New York
- 1959 Smithsonian Institution, Washington, D.C.
- 1959 Rhode Island School of Design, Providence
- 1958 Gutai 9, Osaka, Japan
- 1958, 1962 Virginia Museum of Fine Arts
- 1958 Inter-American Paintings & Prints Biennial, Mexico City
- 1959, 1957 Indiana University, Bloomington
- 1955 Munson-Williams Proctor Institute, Utica, New York
- 1954-55, 1961 Guggenheim Museum, New York
- 1953-54 Museum of Modern Art, New York
- 1953, 1954 University of Nebraska
- 1953 Biennale, São Paulo
- 1952 Saarbrücken
- 1952 Architectural Figurativa, Milan Italy
- 1952 Galleria del Cavallino, Venice, Italy
- 1952 Artists Spaziale, Trieste
- 1952 Premio Gianni, Milan, Italy
- 1951 Third Tokyo Annual
- 1951 Ninth Street Annual, New York
- 1950, 1986 Biennale, Venice, Italy
- 1948-51, 1953, 1960, 1961 University of Illinois
- 1947 Pasedot Gallery, New York
- 1947 Toledo Museum of Art
- 1947 University of Iowa
- 1947 Exposition Surrealist, Prague
- 1946 Albright-Knox Art Gallery, Buffalo
- 1946, 1963 Herron Museum of Art, Indianapolis
- 1945-47 Bignou Gallery, New York
- 1945, 1954, 1956, 1958–59, 1961–63, 1964, 1970 Whitney Annual, New York
- 1945, 1947, 1957 Pennsylvania Art Academy
- 1945, 1947, 1956, 1960-61 Cocoran Gallery, Washington, D.C.
- 1945, 1954, 1957, 1960 Chicago Art Institute
- 1945, 1947, 1950, 1951, 1952, 1954, 1958, 1961 Carnegie International

== Honors ==
- 1954-56, 1963-64 Member of the Jury of Fulbright Scholarship Program
- 1960, 1961, 1962 Visiting Lecturer at Yale University
- 1962-72 Member of the Yale University Council for Arts and Architecture
- 1970, 1972 Chairman National Committee, University Art Museum of California, Berkeley

== See also ==
- Art informel
- Michel Tapié
- Gutai group
