= Angelo Donati =

Italian banker & philanthropist (1885–1960)

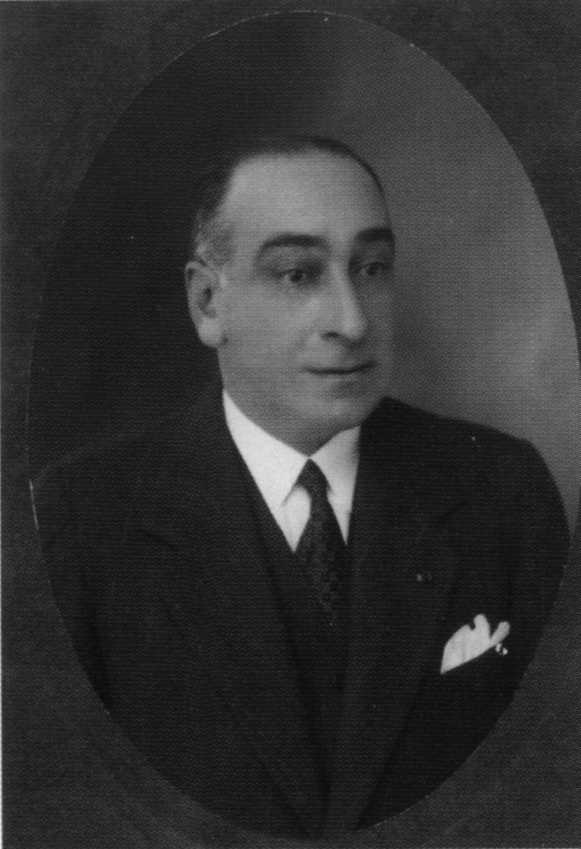
Angelo Donati in Paris in 1930

Cavalier Angelo Donati (3 February 1885 – 30 December 1960) was an Italian banker and philanthropist, and a diplomat of the San Marino Republic in Paris.

== Biography ==
Donati was born in Modena to a Sephardi Jewish family. Himself a Jew, he was famous for saving Jews from Nazi persecution in Italian-occupied France between 1942 and 1943.

He came from one of the most important families of the Jewish Community of Modena, whose origins go back to the second half of the 16th century, when Donato Donati (merchant), who lived in Finale Emilia, received from Duke Cesare d'Este the permit to introduce the planting of buckwheat in the Duchy of Modena and Reggio.

Angelo's father, Salvatore, was a merchant; among his seven brothers, Lazzaro was a banker, Mandolino manager of Conceria Pellami, Amedeo president of Modena Accountants, Federico a lawyer, Benvenuto a professor of law philosophy, Nino an industrialist of straw hats in Florence. Among his cousins Donato was president of Macerata University, Mario a world-famous surgeon, Pio a lawyer and member of Italian Parliament for the Italian Socialist Party and antifascist. Among his uncles Lazzaro was a banker and from 1911 to 1932 member of the executive board of Cassa di Risparmio delle Provincie Lombarde, Augusto was a lawyer and president of Pio Albergo Trivulzio and the orphanage of Martinitt and Stelline from 1900 to his sudden death in 1903. His nephew Enrico Donati was an important surrealist artist, who died in New York in 2008.

After graduating in law and practicing banking in Milan and Turin he left for the war in May 1915, he fought in the trenches as a captain in infantry, in 1916 he went into aviation and accomplished many war missions, he was then sent to France with linkage duties between the Italian and French armies.

In 1919 he settled in Paris and became a capable manager of various companies, both in Italy and France. From 1925 to 1932 he was general Consul of the Republic of San Marino, from 1932 to 1939 he was president of the Italian Chamber of Commerce in Paris, a duty he had to leave for the fascist racial laws against the Jews. He was awarded the title of Grand’Ufficiale of the Italian Crown and the San Marino title of Commendatore dell’Ordine di Sant'Agata, while the French Government awarded him in 1936 the title of Commandeur of the Légion d'honneur.

== Aid to the Jews, 1942-1943 ==
In 1940 Donati left Paris before the entrance of the German troops, went to Cauterets in Hautes-Pyrénées, then to Marseille where he was the best man at the wedding of Piero Sacerdoti with Ilse Klein on 14 August 1940 and fled to Nice, which was occupied by Italian troops on 18 November 1942, together with the departments of Isère, Hautes-Alpes, Basses-Alpes, Alpes-Maritimes, Haute-Savoie, Var and Corsica, and partially of Vaucluse and Drôme, following the allied landing operation in Algeria and Morocco. In Nice he was director of the Franco-Italian Bank.

After the entrance of the Italian troops in Nice, Donati, who added to his personal prestige good relations and acquaintances in Italian military and diplomatic milieus, took charge of the future of the Jews. Every morning two members of the Committee for help to the refugees ("Committee Dubouchage") together with Rabbi Saltiel took him documents, asked for visas, and discussed with him about actions to protect the Jews in the occupied Departments.

Thanks to the information received by Donati, the general consul of Italy Alberto Calisse succeeded in opposing effectively the decisions of French authorities who wanted to deport the Jews to Poland under German pressure, at the point that the "Committee Dubouchage" printed a document with the synagogue visa which the French police had to accept because authorized by the Italians.

The protests of the German authorities in Rome forced Benito Mussolini to create a Crown Office of Racial Police in Nice, assigned to Inspector Guido Lospinoso. After arriving in Nice Lospinoso met with Donati, who explained the difficult situation and made him understand that he was the best informed person on the facts.

When the Vichy Government, under German pressure, ordered to the prefect of Nice, Marcel Ribière, to arrest all the foreign Jews in Côte d'Azur, General Avarna di Gualtieri, who represented the supreme Italian command in Vichy, cancelled all the decisions against the Jews in the Italian occupation zone because "these decisions have to be taken only by Italian military occupation authorities".

Moreover, after two young members of French Milice tried to attack the Jews who were leaving the Synagogue, Barranco, head of Italian police, sent four carabinieri to protect the synagogue.

The Italians took theses actions to show their independence from the Germans - one can discern Donati's continuous intelligent and diplomatic action. All the German telegrams and letters expressed rage and indignation at the resistance to German demands.

In spite of the arrest orders by the German police Donati succeeded in sending 2.500 Jews away from Nice by transferring them to areas not occupied by the Germans such as the "forced residency" in Saint-Martin-Vésubie in Alpes-Maritimes department. The French authorities had received the order not to interfere with the transfer. The French director André Waksman made the film for the television about this 1943, A pause during the Holocaust, shown for the first time in Paris on 4 December 2009.

Donati's activity in Nice became a legend, his name became a beacon. The members of the French militia and his enemies called him "the Pope of the Jews".

== The 1943 rescue plan ==
At the beginning of 1943 Donati prepared an ambitious plan to transfer thousands of Jews from southern France to Palestine with the support of the Italian, Vatican, British and American authorities. He talked with the British and American ambassadors to the Vatican, Osborne and Titman, in August and was aided by the prudent and strenuous work of the French Capuchin Père Marie-Benoît who was connected to the Italian Jewish relief organization DELASEM.

The intention was to send to Italy the maximum possible number of Jewish refugees and from there to transfer them in Northern Africa in four ships (Duilio, Giulio Cesare, Saturnia, Vulcania) paid for by the Jewish Joint Committee. In Rome passports were prepared. The Badoglio government had chosen the sites where the refugees would be given hospitality and had assured the feasibility of the operation before the disclosure of the Armistice with the Allies which was signed on September 3.

When the king of Italy signed the armistice with the Allies however, the plan fell through. Donati, who had planned to return to Nice to organize the transfer, was luckily stopped in Florence because in Nice the Gestapo was waiting to arrest him, his apartment was sacked and robbed. Searched for by the Germans also in Italy, he stayed in hiding for three months first in Tuscany and then in Lombardy, then he succeeded in taking refuge in Switzerland on 14 October 1943 at Stabio with some nephews.

From Montreux, where he lived, Donati tried to find out what happened to the deported Jews putting pressure on the International Red Cross and meeting in Bern with the Apostolic Nuncio and British, American and Italian diplomats.

== The diplomat 1945-1960 ==
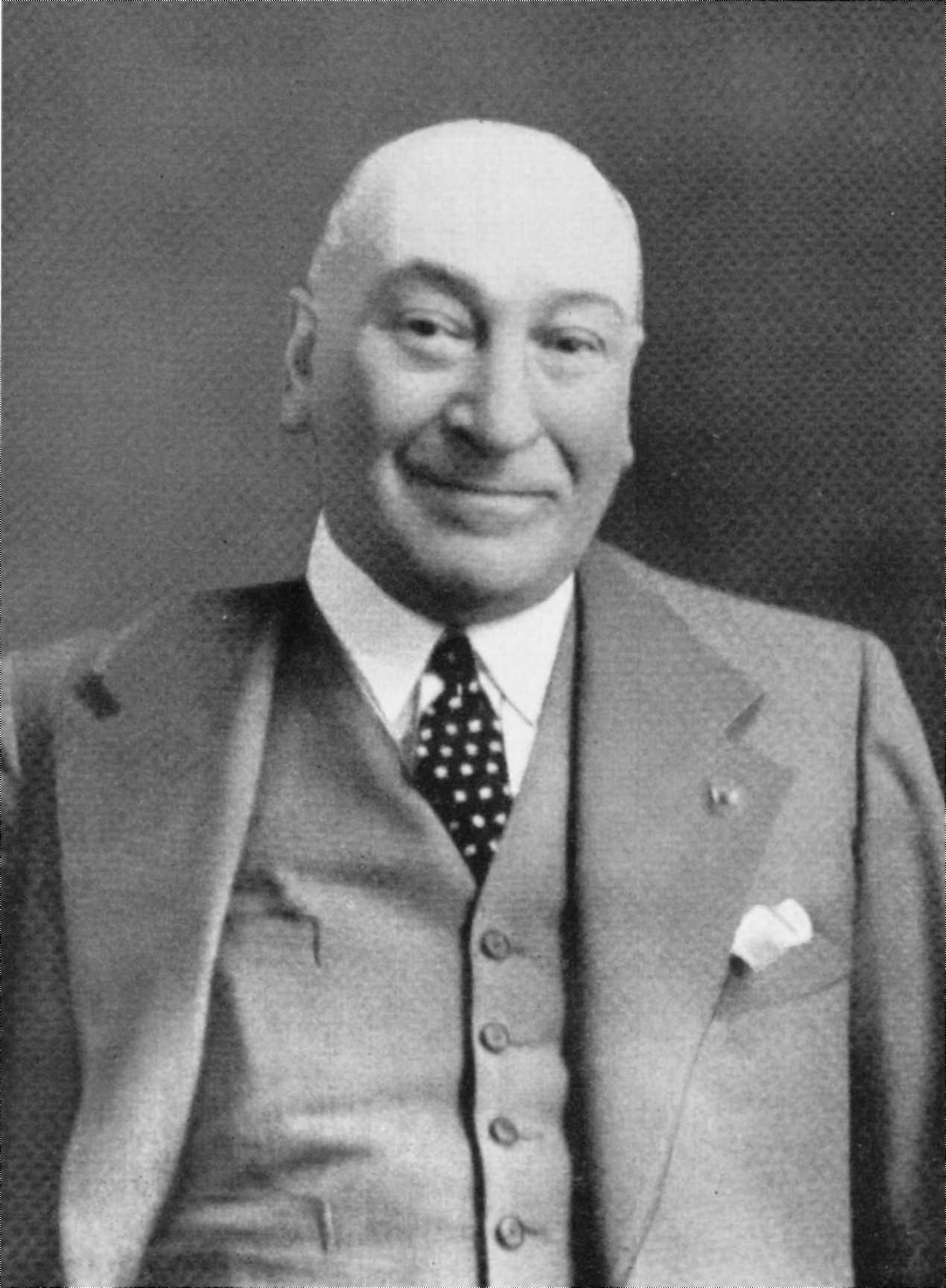
Angelo Donati in the Fifties

In 1945 the Italian Government invited Donati to go back to France and appointed him as general assistant Delegate of the Red Cross.

In agreement with the Italian ambassador in Paris Giuseppe Saragat (later President of the Italian Republic) he led the negotiations with the French government for assisting and liberating the Italian prisoners and civil internees. He was also appointed Chargé d'Affaires of San Marino Republic in Paris and, in November 1953, promoted to Plenipotentiary Minister.

Thanks to the good relations with the Apostolic Nuncio in Paris Angelo Roncalli (afterwards Pope John XXIII) Donati helped in 1953 to resolve the Finaly Affair involving two Jewish children who had been saved from deportation by Catholic nuns who didn't want to give them back to their uncles after the war because they had been baptized.

Donati forcefully refused the role of a hero or declarations of gratitude but received declarations and letters of gratitude from the Jewish organizations of Nice and individual Jews.

He adopted two Jewish children nine and ten years old, Marianne and Rolf Spier, whose German Jewish parents Carl Spier and Hilde Wolff had been deported from France and killed in Nazi German concentration camps located on occupied Polish soil. Donati's servant, Francesco Moraldo, hid them in Creppo in the municipality of Triora in Liguria, his birthplace, after Donati's flight to Switzerland.

Donati died in Paris. On 27 January 2004, Modena Municipality, the Fondazione Cassa di Risparmio di Modena, the Istituto Storico di Modena and the Jewish Community of Modena and Reggio Emilia organized a Study Convention in memory of Angelo Donati and an exhibition with photos.

On February 3 and 4 2016 the city of Nice has organized celebrations in his memory. The celebrations started in the Synagogue and finished with the unveiling of a commemorative plaque on the Promenade des Anglais at the corner with Rue Cronstadt, in front of Hôtel Negresco.

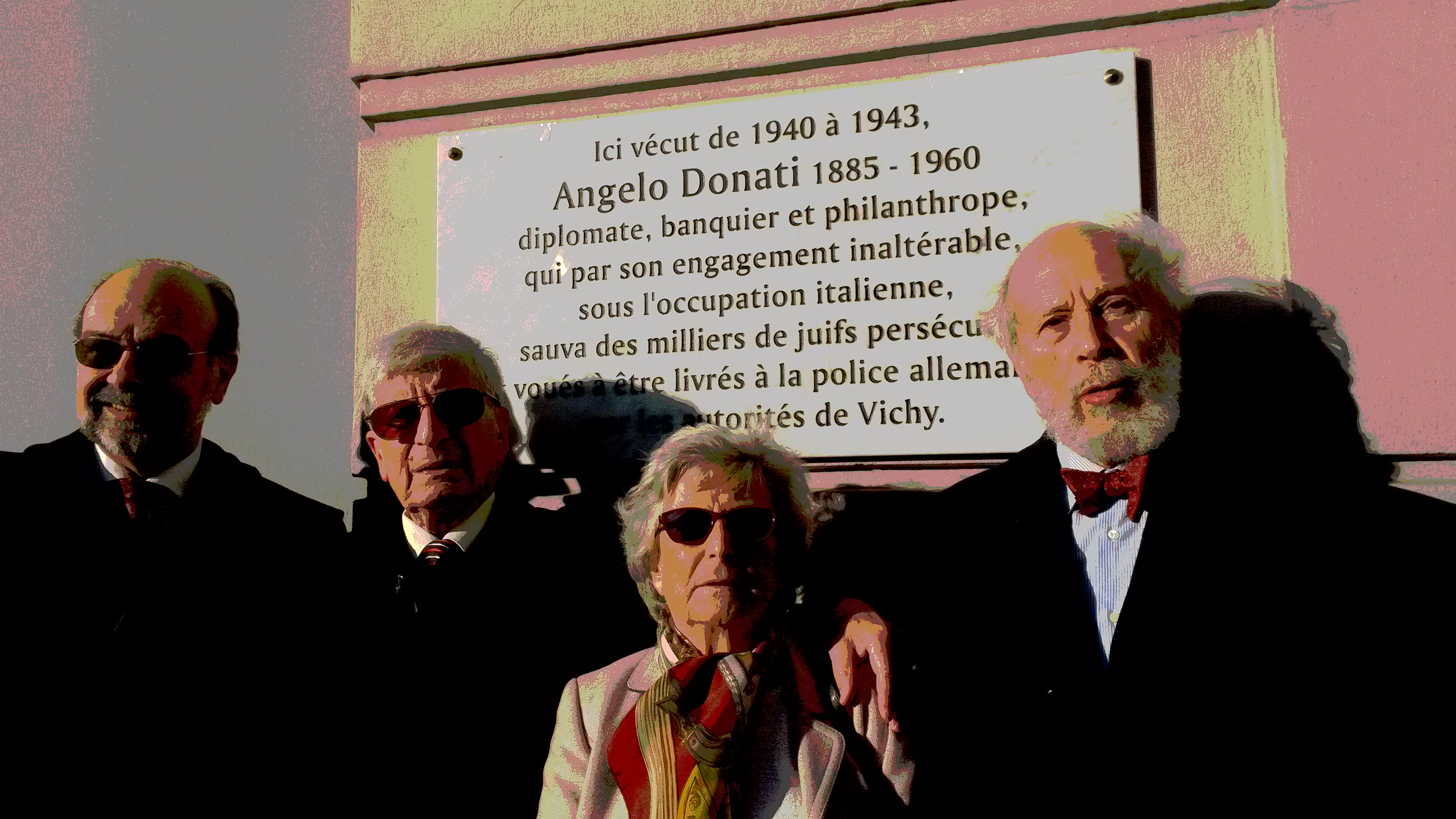
Plaque in memory of Angelo Donati in Nice

== Honours ==
- Grand'Ufficiale of the Italian Crown
- Commendatore of the Ordine di Sant'Agata of San Marino
- Commandeur de la Legion d'honneur, 1936
- Commendatore dell'Ordine della Stella della Solidarietà Italiana, 23 November 1950
- Gold Medal for civil merit in remembrance, 26 January 2004, with the following motivation by the President of the Italian Republic Ciampi: During the second world war in the area of France occupied by Italian troupes, Angelo Donati, with indomitable courage succeeded in saving, in collaboration with Italian civil and military authorities, thousands of Jews of different nationalities, protecting their lives menaced by deportation in nazi extermination camps. With generosity of mind and passionate commitment he gave life and coherent affirmation to the values of liberty and justice. Noble and shining example of elevated civic virtues.

== See also ==
- Italian occupation of France during World War II
