= Riunione Adriatica di Sicurtà =

Italian insurance company (1838–2007)

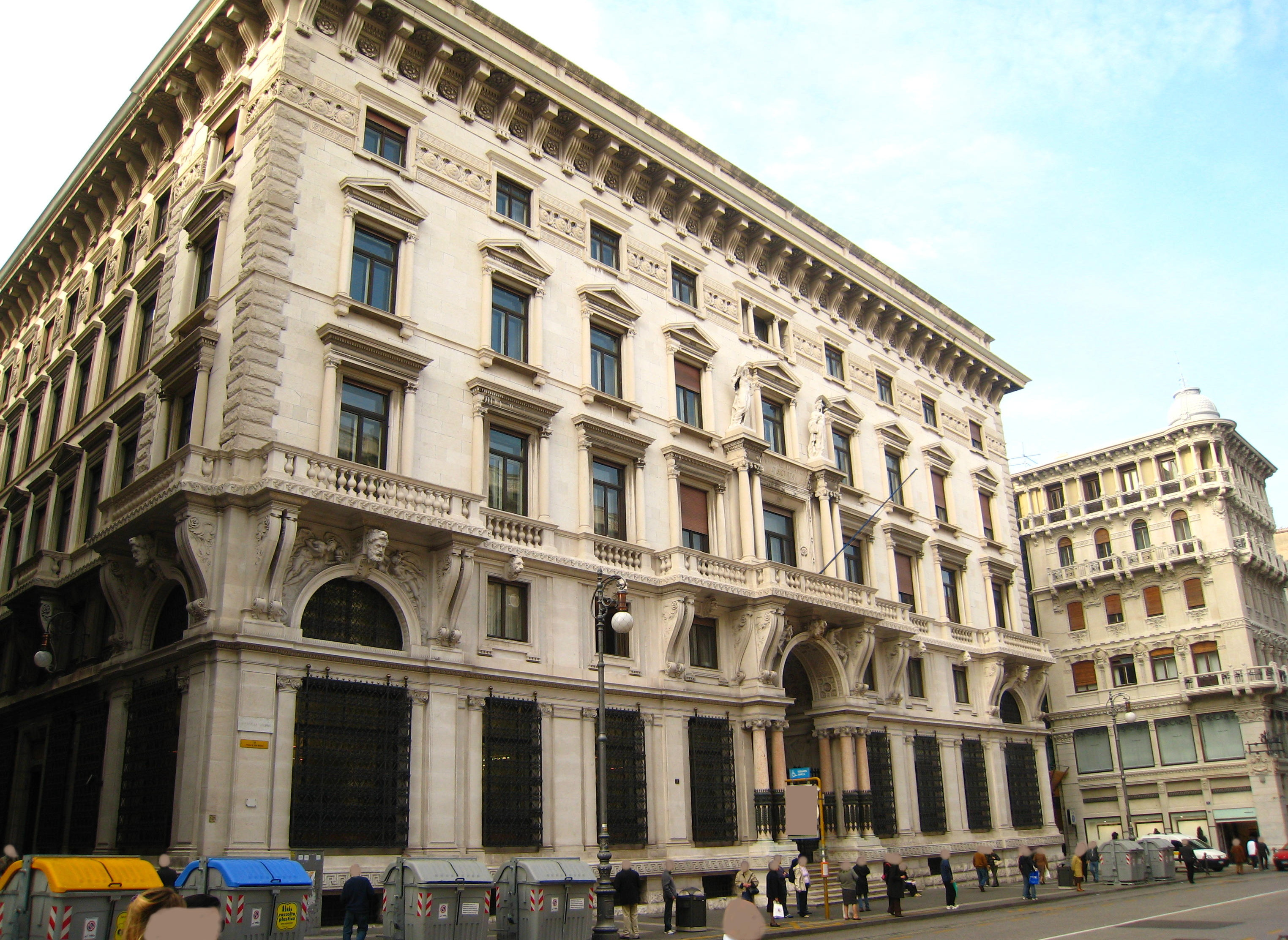
- The former headquarters in Trieste, inaugurated in 1914
- Trade name: RAS
- Type: Società per azioni
- Industry: Insurance
- Founded: 9 May 1838 in Trieste, Austrian Empire
- Founder: Alessandro Daninos
- Defunct: 1 October 2007
- Fate: Renamed Allianz S.p.A.
- Headquarters: Milan, Italy
- Parent: Allianz

Riunione Adriatica di Sicurtà (RAS) was an Italian insurance company. It was founded in 1838 in Trieste, then part of the Austrian Empire, and soon became the second-largest insurer in the Habsburg monarchy after Assicurazioni Generali. In 1947 it moved its seat to Milan. The German insurer Allianz bought the controlling stake in 1984 and merged with RAS in 2006. In October 2007 RAS was renamed Allianz S.p.A.

== History ==
=== Foundation and Habsburg period ===
RAS was founded on 9 May 1838 by the Adriatico Banco d'Assicurazione, a marine insurer set up in Trieste in 1826. The new company dealt in fire and cargo insurance and had a capital of 1.5 million florins.

In 1853 it introduced hail insurance in Bohemia, and in the following year it opened a life insurance department. In 1862 it took over the Adriatico Banco.

In 1898, when accident insurance became compulsory for many industries, RAS set up L'Assicuratrice Italiana for accident and liability insurance. A similar company, La Protectrice, was established in Paris in 1911. In the first decade of the 20th century a single directorate for Italy was created in Milan.

In 1915, when Italy entered the First World War, the Austrian authorities moved the general directorate to Vienna. From August 1916 to September 1917 a decree of the Italian government placed RAS under supervision. At the end of the war, when Trieste became Italian, the company rewrote its charter, converted its capital into lire, and appointed Scipione de Sandrinelli, a former mayor of Trieste, as Chairman.

=== Interwar period and Second World War ===
Arnoldo Frigessi di Rattalma became president in 1933. After the war he carried out a programme of reconstruction and expansion in Austria and in the other countries that had belonged to the Empire.

Frigessi belonged to a Jewish family. After the Italian racial laws of 1938 he was removed as president and replaced by Fulvio Suvich, a former under-secretary at the Foreign Ministry. He obtained an exemption from the laws and remained general manager and managing director. After 8 September 1943 the persecution of Jews by the German occupiers forced him into hiding. RAS was then managed in the north by Marchesano and, from June 1944, in the centre and south by Frigessi. Frigessi became president again in 1947.

The 1947 peace treaty required the surrender of all Italian property in Hungary, Romania and Bulgaria as war reparations. Soon afterwards the insurance market was nationalised in Czechoslovakia, the second-largest market of RAS, and the company had to leave Albania, Poland and Yugoslavia. With the withdrawal from eastern Europe it lost almost a third of its business. In 1947, because the future of Trieste was uncertain, the legal seat was moved to Milan. Frigessi died in Trieste on 8 April 1950.

=== Postwar period ===
On 9 May 1950, after the death of Frigessi, Marchesano became president of RAS, and he held the post until 1965. He promoted the entry of Carlo Pesenti, the owner of Italcementi, who acquired the controlling stake in 1952.

Piero Sacerdoti, who had managed the two French subsidiaries from 1936, was appointed general manager in 1949. In the early 1960s RAS and Cariplo tried contracts that linked bank savings with life policies. The company continued to expand abroad, mainly in the Americas, and in 1960 it entered Australia with Consolidated Insurances of Australia.

=== Allianz ownership ===
Carlo Pesenti died in September 1984. His son Giampiero decided to pay the debts of the group by selling some of its holdings. The first to be sold was the stake in RAS, which went to Allianz in 1984. According to the International Directory of Company Histories, Allianz bought Pesenti's 38 per cent together with other holdings from Toro Assicurazioni and from Saes, a subsidiary of the Agnelli family's holding company IFI, and in 1987 its share rose to 51.51 per cent.

In September 2005 Allianz, which already controlled about 55 per cent of RAS, prepared an offer for the remaining 45 per cent. After the offer Allianz held 76.3 per cent of the ordinary shares. In December the boards of the two companies approved the merger plan, with an exchange ratio of three Allianz shares for every nineteen RAS shares. The merger was registered on 13 October 2006, and Allianz became a European company (SE).

With effect from 1 October 2007 the insurance business of Lloyd Adriatico and Allianz Subalpina was transferred to RAS, which was renamed Allianz S.p.A. The company chose Trieste as its registered office.

== Buildings ==
The former headquarters in Trieste, on Piazza della Repubblica, were designed in eclectic style by Ruggero and Arduino Berlam and built between 1909 and 1914.

The company's building in Vienna

In 1911 the company commissioned Ludwig Baumann to design a new building in Vienna, at Tegetthoffstraße 7–9.

The Adria Palace in Prague, built for RAS between 1922 and 1925

In Prague, the Adria Palace at the corner of Jungmannova Street and Národní Avenue was built by RAS between 1922 and 1925 in the rondocubist style. It was designed by Josef Zasche, with interiors by Pavel Janák.

The headquarters in Milan, a complex of three buildings between Corso Italia and Via Santa Sofia, were designed by Gio Ponti with Piero Portaluppi and Antonio Fornaroli and inaugurated in May 1962. Allianz left the complex in 2018.
