= Vienna Summit =

1961 meeting in Vienna, Austria

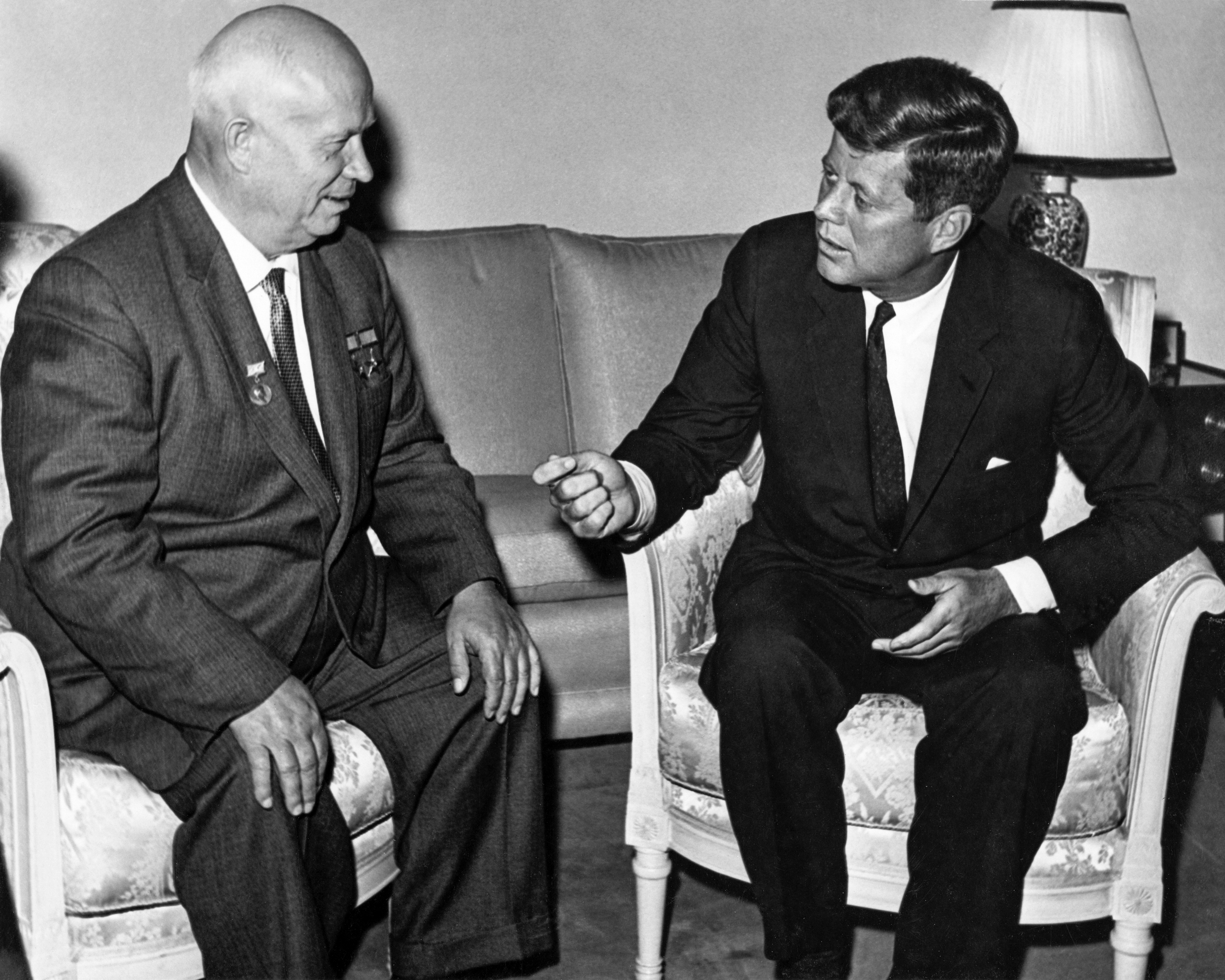
- Host country: Austria
- Date: June 4, 1961
- Cities: Vienna
- Venues: Embassy of the United States, Vienna
- Participants: (Soviet Union) Nikita Khrushchev (United States) John F. Kennedy
- Follows: Four Power Paris Summit
- Precedes: Glassboro Summit Conference

US Information Agency motion picture on the Vienna summit

The Vienna Summit was a summit meeting held on June 4, 1961, in Vienna, Austria, between President of the United States John F. Kennedy and the leader of the Soviet Union (First Secretary and Premier) Nikita Khrushchev. The leaders of the two superpowers of the Cold War era discussed many issues in the relationship between their countries.

== Context ==
=== Khrushchev and Kennedy prior to the summit ===
Kennedy and Khrushchev first met at the Vienna Summit in June 1961. Prior to meeting face to face, their contact began when Khrushchev sent Kennedy a message on November 9, 1960, congratulating him on his presidential election victory and stating his hope that "relations between [the US and USSR] would again follow the line along which they were developing in Franklin Roosevelt's time." He also told Kennedy that the USSR desired to negotiate with the U.S. on issues relating to "disarmament ... a German peace treaty ... and other questions which could bring about an easing and improvement of the entire international situation." In a reply message, Kennedy thanked Khrushchev and similar niceties continued until 1961.

On February 22, 1961, Kennedy sent Khrushchev a letter stating, "I hope it will be possible, before too long, for us to meet personally for an informal exchange of views." This was the first time either man suggested a diplomatic meeting. Kennedy felt "that if he could just sit down with Khrushchev" the two leaders could work out their interstate conflicts. Yet, Kennedy's advisers told him not to meet with Khrushchev so soon after the presidential election. The American ambassador to Moscow, Llewellyn E. Thompson, feared that Kennedy misjudged Khrushchev's personality and intentions. Likewise, U.S. diplomat Charles Bohlen "worried that JFK underrated Khrushchev's determination to expand world communism." Nevertheless, Khrushchev accepted Kennedy's summit proposal, and the leaders began to make plans for their official meeting. Meanwhile, Cold War rivalries between the two powers escalated in Germany, Laos, and Cuba. These regional conflicts became major items on the Vienna Summit agenda.

=== The Berlin question ===
Between 1945 and 1961, 2.7 million East Germans emigrated from East Berlin, a part of the German Democratic Republic (GDR), to West Berlin. GDR leader Walter Ulbricht argued that the large number of emigrants leaving East Berlin threatened the existence of the GDR by diminishing its population. In the early months of 1961, Ulbricht pressured Khrushchev to close the border between East and West Berlin. Khrushchev understood Ulbricht's concern but feared that a potential intervention from Western powers would destabilize East Berlin further. Thompson warned in February 1961 that if there were "no progress" on Berlin and Germany, Khrushchev would "almost certainly proceed with [his] separate peace treaty...." The notion of a separate peace treaty threatened American interests in West Germany; if the USSR rendered complete control of East Berlin to the East German government, then the US could only communicate with and control West Berlin with permission from the East German government.

The Berlin Question—whether or not the US would allow the USSR to sign a separate peace treaty with Berlin—dominated Khrushchev and Kennedy's debates at the Vienna Summit. The signing of a separate peace treaty with Berlin did not appeal to American policymakers, who felt comfortable with the division of Germany and Berlin itself. A peace treaty threatened the established balance of power and could potentially lead to the United States losing all its influence in East Berlin.

=== The Laos question ===
A lesser-known conflict fueled controversy at the Vienna Summit as well. "As in Berlin, [Kennedy] inherited in Laos a situation aggravated by near-direct armed confrontation between the Soviet Union and the United States." During Eisenhower's presidency, the US backed a right-wing conservative government (royal government) in Laos to counter the communist threat of the popular Pathet Lao. In Laos, "the Eisenhower government committed millions of dollars in aid" in order to continue the rule of a pro-American leader. Both the Soviets and the Americans knew that a proxy war in Laos drove both countries further into an arms race. Under this context, Khrushchev and Kennedy discussed the Laos situation at length at the Vienna Summit.

=== The Bay of Pigs Invasion ===
The American-facilitated Bay of Pigs Invasion of April 1961 also rocked Khrushchev and Kennedy's relationship. On April 18, 1961, Khrushchev sent Kennedy a telegram that said, "Mr. President, I send you this message in an hour of alarm, fraught with danger for the peace of the whole world. Armed aggression has begun against Cuba." Kennedy countered by saying that the Americans were merely helping support the "100,000 Cubans" attempting to "[resist] the Castro dictatorship." He claimed that the Americans fought on the side of freedom and Cuban self-determination.

Kennedy knew that the Cuban invasion sparked controversy. Therefore, Kennedy felt it crucial to meet with Khrushchev as soon as possible. He hoped that open channels of communication could remedy some of the conflict between the US and the USSR. Khrushchev and Kennedy met in Vienna on June 4, 1961.

== Discussions ==
Khrushchev and Kennedy devoted a significant amount of time at the Vienna Summit to discussing the Berlin Crisis. Khrushchev opened the conversation by expressing the Soviet perspective that a united Germany could lead to another World War. He pointed to the fact that Germany began World War II. Only 15 years after the end of that war, Germany again posed a "military threat" as a member of NATO. Khrushchev explained that the USSR desired to sign a separate peace treaty with East Germany. Such a treaty, he argued, "would not prejudice the interests of the U.S., the UK, or France." He told Kennedy that if the United States failed to support a peace treaty, the Soviet Union would sign the peace treaty unilaterally.

Kennedy replied that American forces occupied Berlin "by contractual rights" rather than by the agreement of East Germans. Kennedy understood the Soviet perspective but feared that if the US removed its troops from Berlin, "no one would have any confidence in U.S. commitments and pledges." Kennedy insisted that the US maintain its position in Berlin for strategic purposes. Although Kennedy argued that the current balance of power in Germany was effective, Khrushchev said that "no force in the world would prevent the USSR from signing a peace treaty."

When Kennedy pointed out that such a treaty required unilateral action on the part of the Soviet Union, thereby ignoring the four-power agreement signed at the end of World War II, Khrushchev stated that such a peace treaty nullified the four-power agreement. He insisted that the city of Berlin should belong solely to the German Democratic Republic. West Germany, Khrushchev told Kennedy, would remain under American influence. Kennedy countered by saying that the US could not accept such an agreement owing to the prestige it would lose as a result. In light of this remark, Khrushchev suggested that an "interim arrangement" be considered. Khrushchev remained firm in the fact that "the Soviet Union [would] sign [the peace treaty] in December if the U.S. [refused] an interim agreement."

Kennedy hoped to determine the Soviets' feeling regarding the neutralization of Laos. Kennedy wanted to convince Khrushchev that the United States and Soviet Union could work together to de-escalate tensions in the unstable state. "Without a firm Soviet commitment to stop supplying the guerrillas and to persuade the North Vietnamese to halt their efforts, nothing could be accomplished," Kennedy asserted. On the first day of the Summit, Kennedy quickly discovered that Khrushchev was in no mood to discuss the Laos situation. Khrushchev only rebuffed the United States for playing a significant role in the overthrowing of the Laos government.

The next day, Kennedy approached the Laos subject again. This time, Khrushchev negotiated more willingly. Khrushchev agreed that a "neutral and independent Laos chosen by the Laotians themselves" benefited both the US and the USSR. Although the leaders made no official agreement, they did reach a consensus regarding the future of Laos—cease-fire and ultimate neutralization. This agreement proved to be one of the only accomplishments of the Vienna Summit.

== Outcomes ==
Seymour Topping's article on "Khrushchev and Vienna" ran in The New York Times on June 3—the day before the conference began. Topping correctly identified the major points of conversation that dominated the conference—the Berlin and Laos questions. Topping also correctly stated Khrushchev's opinions regarding each issue and pinpointed the Soviet perspective on Berlin. Clearly, both the Americans and the Soviets had ample information regarding the other's position prior to the opening of the Summit. However, no one could predict the outcome of the summit, including the leaders' reactions to each other.

For the Americans, the summit was initially seen as a diplomatic triumph. Kennedy had refused to allow Soviet pressure to force his hand, or to influence the American policy of containment. He had adequately stalled Khrushchev and made it clear that the United States was not willing to compromise on a withdrawal from Berlin, whatever pressure Khrushchev may exert on the "testicles of the West", as Khrushchev once called them.

In retrospect the summit may be seen as a failure. The two leaders became increasingly frustrated at the lack of progress of the negotiations. Kennedy later said of Khrushchev, "He beat the hell out of me" and told New York Times reporter James 'Scotty' Reston immediately afterwards it was the "worst thing in my life. He savaged me." On the other hand, Khrushchev viewed the summit in a much more positive light. In his memoir he showed ambivalence, writing, "I was generally pleased with our meeting in Vienna. Even though we came to no concrete agreement, I could tell that [Kennedy] was interested in finding a peaceful solution to world problems and avoiding conflict with the Soviet Union." However, historian William Taubman suggests that Khrushchev merely felt he could "push Kennedy around."

In addition to conveying US reluctance to defend the full rights of Berlin's citizens, Kennedy ignored his own cabinet officials' advice to avoid ideological debate with Khrushchev. Khrushchev outmatched Kennedy in this debate and came away believing he had triumphed in the summit over a weak and inexperienced leader. Observing Kennedy's morose expression at the end of the summit, Khrushchev believed Kennedy "looked not only anxious, but deeply upset.... I hadn't meant to upset him. I would have liked very much for us to part in a different mood. But there was nothing I could do to help him.... Politics is a merciless business."

After the failure of the Bay of Pigs Invasion, the construction of the Berlin Wall, and the Cuban Missile Crisis, then Kennedy believed that another failure on the part of the United States to gain control and stop communist expansion would fatally damage US credibility with its allies and his own reputation. He was thus determined to "draw a line in the sand" and prevent a communist victory in the Vietnam War. He told Reston, "Now we have a problem making our power credible and Vietnam looks like the place."

== See also ==
- List of Soviet Union–United States summits (1943 to 1991)
