= Ludwig Baumann (architect) =

Austrian architect

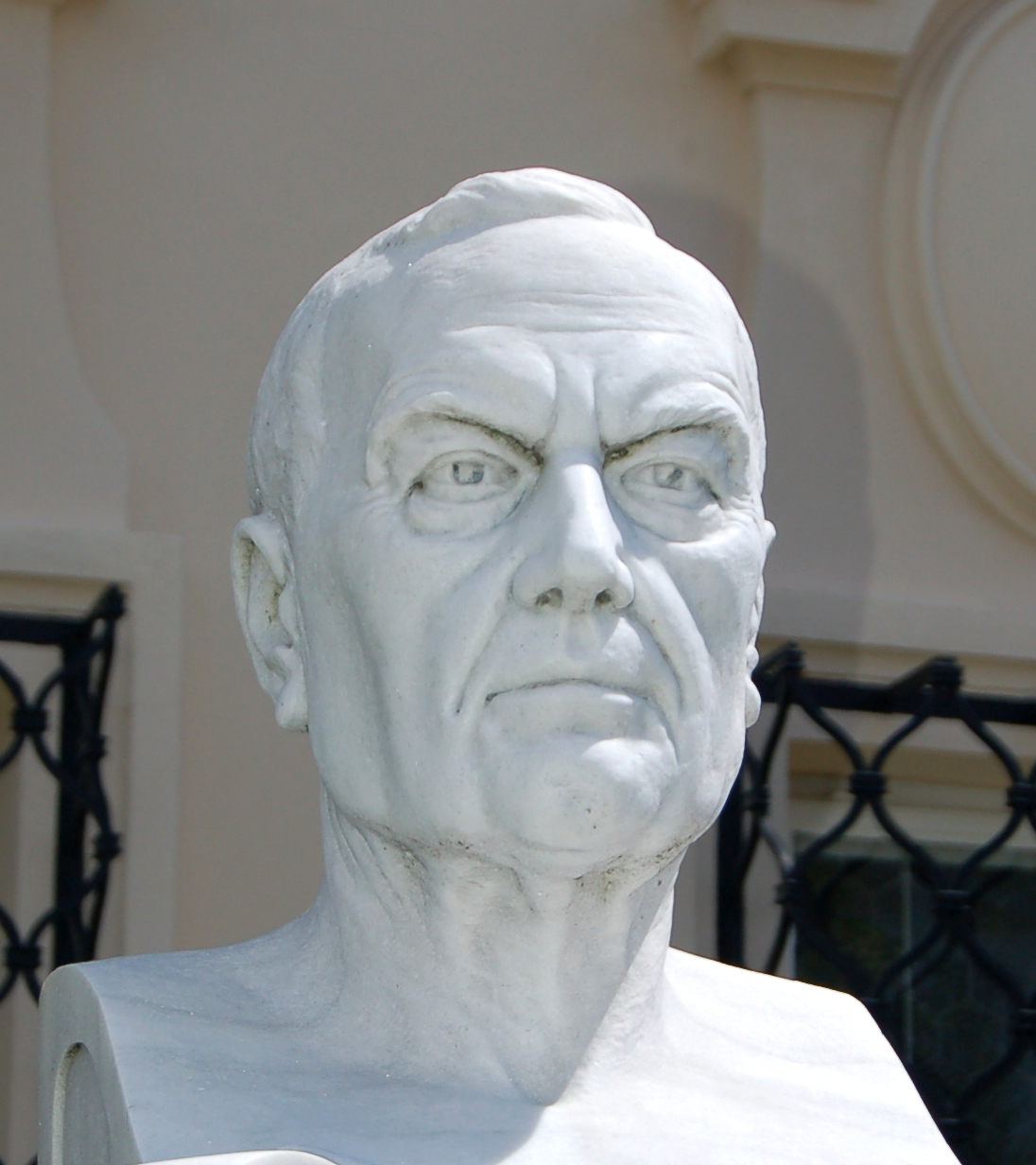
- Bust of Baumann at St. Margareta's parish church in Berndorf, Austria
- Born: May 11, 1853; Troppau, Austrian Silesia, Austrian Empire
- Died: February 6, 1936 (aged 82); Vienna, Federal State of Austria
- Occupation: Architect

Ludwig Baumann (11 May 1853 – 6 February 1936) was an Austrian architect.

== Life ==
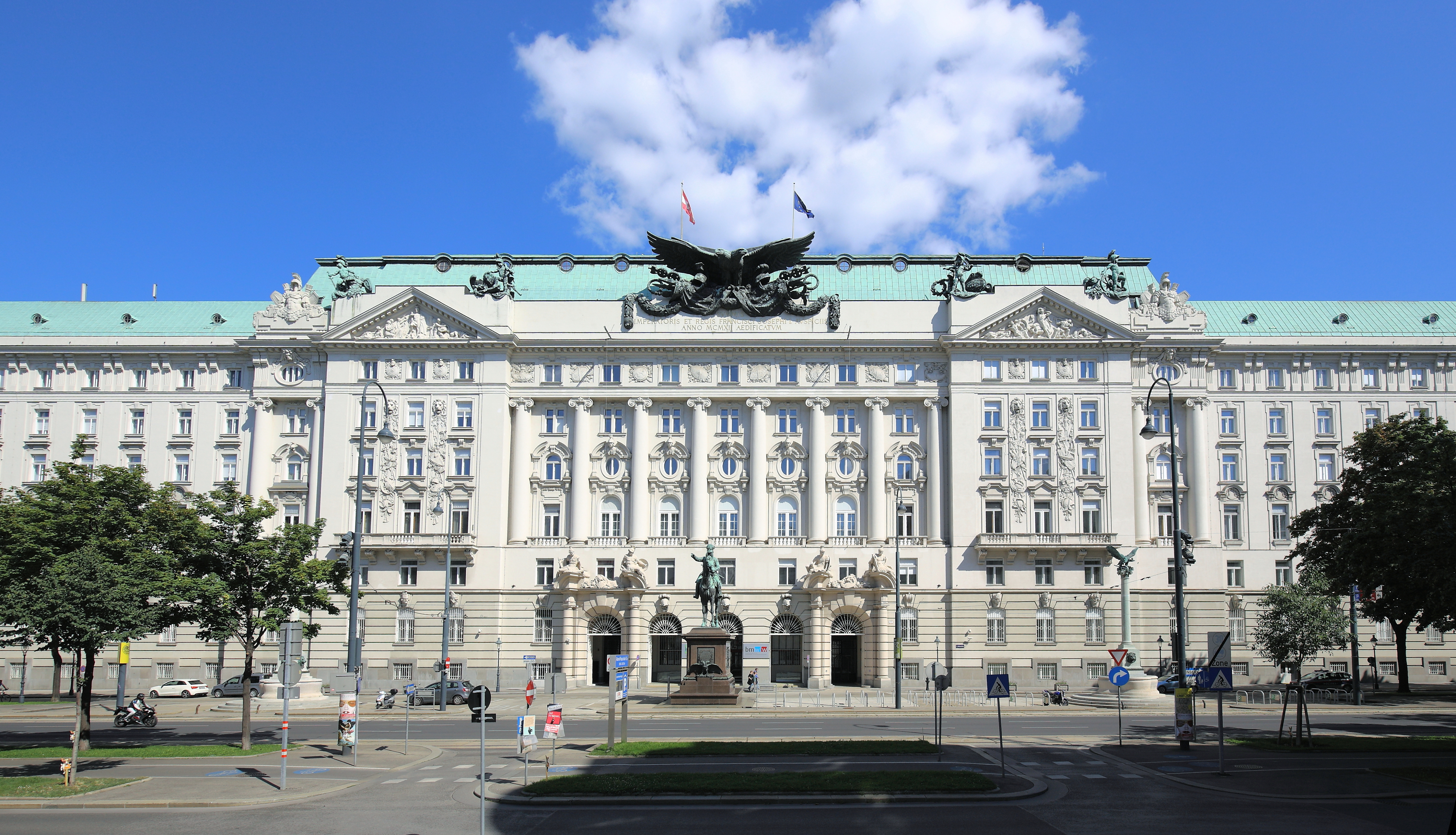
Ministry of War, Vienna (1908–10)

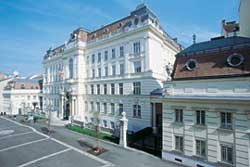
American Embassy, Vienna (1902–04)

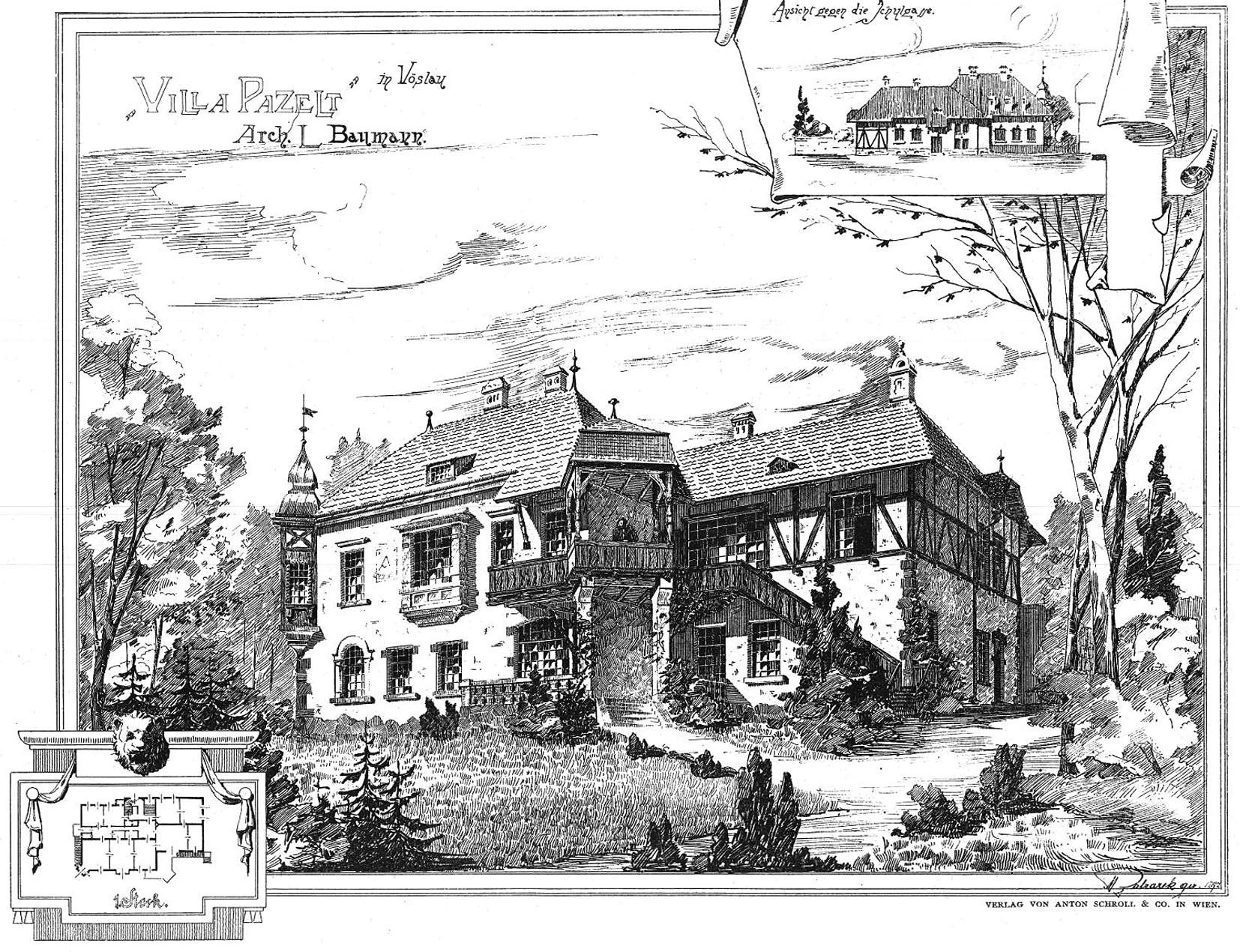
Villa Pazelt, Bad Vöslau (1897)

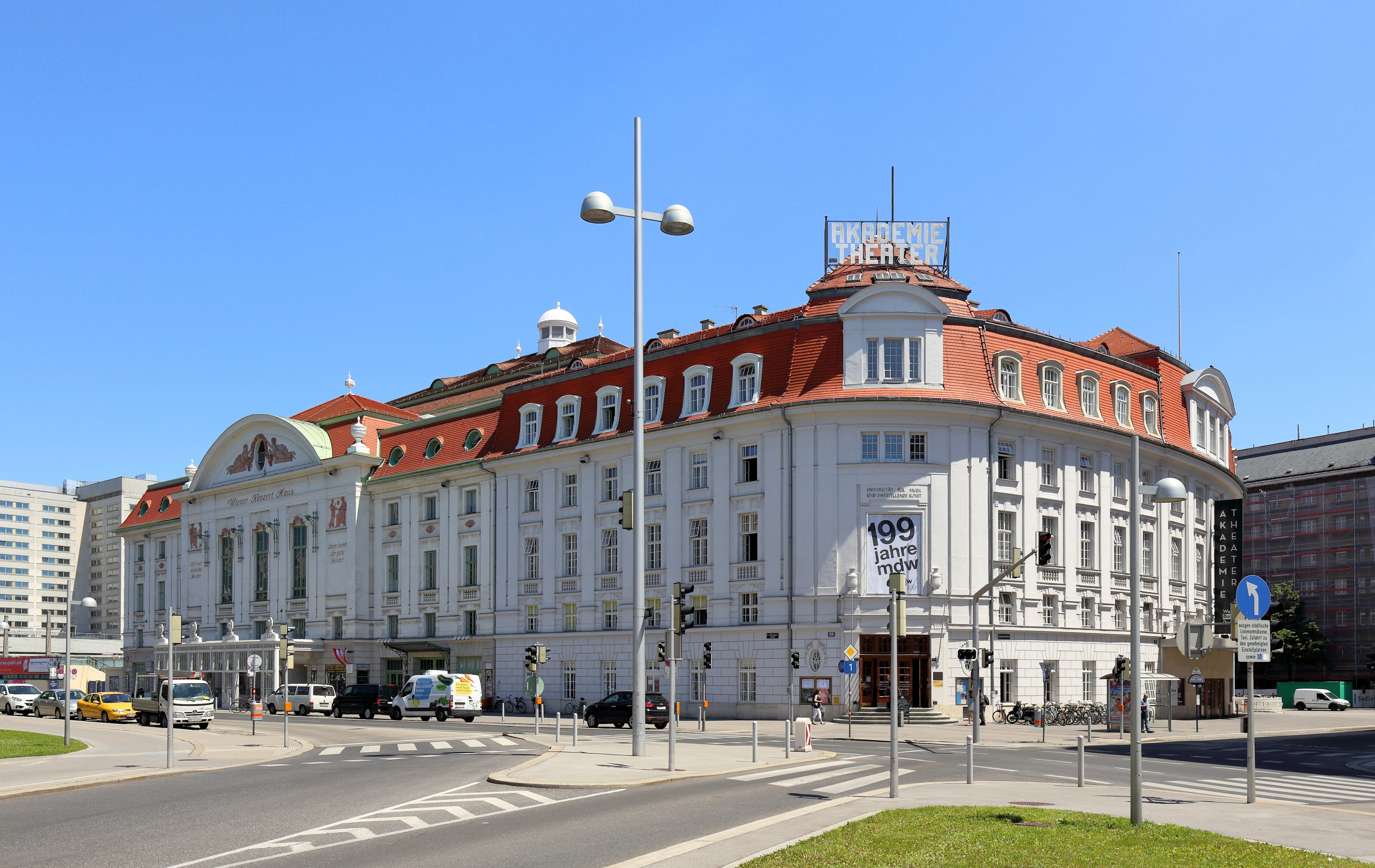
Concert Hall and Academy of Music, Vienna (1911–13)

Baumann was born in Seibersdorf Castle in Troppau, Austrian Silesia, and grew up in a middle-class environment, which enabled him eventually to study at the ETH Zurich. He came from a family of constructive expertise, as his father was a civil engineer. After completing his architectural studies (1870–74), he was employed by Wienerberger Ziegelfabriks- und Bau-Gesellschaft beginning in 1876, and then by Viktor Rumpelmayer from 1879 to 1882. In 1882 he formed a partnership with Emil Bressler. Beginning in 1888 he served as a highly valued architect to the upper-middle class and aristocracy of the Austro-Hungarian monarchy. In particular, he enjoyed the favor and trust of Archduke Franz Ferdinand. In 1904 with Hermann Helmer he founded the Central Association of Architects.

Initially influenced by the international Renaissance revival due to his studies in Zürich with Gottfried Semper, around 1900 Baumann switched to a conservative Baroque-revival vocabulary as an Austrian "imperial style". In 1907 he was appointed site manager of the New Hofburg, replacing Friedrich Ohmann. Between 1909 and 1913, his Austro-Hungarian War Ministry was erected as the last monumental building on the Ringstrasse. Baumann was also selected to design many buildings in the Lower Austrian city of Berndorf when it was significantly expanded under Arthur Krupp.

In 1929, still active in various planning projects, Baumann was hit by a bus near the Rochuskirche in Vienna. The injuries sustained could not heal properly, and Baumann spent his last three years in a wheelchair before dying in Vienna. His dedicated grave is located on the Zentralfriedhof (Group B 32, no. 51).

== Selected works ==
- Berndorf in Lower Austria, urban planning (from 1880s)
- School, Berndorf (1896)
- Apartment house at Malinovského náměstí 5, Brno, Czech Republic (1896)
- Villa Pazelt, Bad Vöslau (1897)
- Austrian Pavilion, Exposition Universelle, Paris (1900)
- Vienna Ice Skating Club Square (1900)
- Royal Academy of Oriental Languages, Vienna, today the Embassy of the United States (1902)
- Ministry of War, Vienna (1908–1910)
- Hofburg, new building of the ballroom wing, Vienna (from 1910)
- Wiener Konzerthaus and Akademietheater, Vienna (together with Büro Fellner & Helmer, 1911–1913)
- Riunione Adriatica di Sicurtà, Vienna, Albertina Platz (1911)
- Palazzetto Venezia, Rome (reconstruction 1909–1910)

== Bibliography ==
- Baubeschreibung des Olympion [Building description of the Olympion]. Vienna: Verlag des Eislauf-Vereins, 1877.
- Ludwig Baumann, Emil Bressler, Friedrich Ohmann: Barock. Eine Sammlung von Plafonds, Cartouchen, Consolen, Gittern, Möbeln, Vasen, Öfen, Ornamenten, Interieurs ee. etc., zumeist in kaiserlichen Schlössern, Kirchen, Stiften und anderen Monumentalbauten Österreichs aus der Epoche Leopold I. bis Maria Theresia [Baroque: A Collection of Ceilings, Cartouches, Consoles, Grilles, Furniture, Vases, Stoves, Ornaments, Interiors, etc., Mostly in Imperial Palaces, Churches, Monasteries and other Monumental Buildings in Austria from the Period of Leopold I to Maria Theresa]. Vienna: Schroll, 1886.
- Erläuterungs-Bericht zum Entwurfe für einen General-Regulierungsplan über das gesammte Gemeindegebiet von Wien [Explanatory report on the drafts of a general regulation plan for the entire municipal area of Vienna]. Vienna: Friedrich Jasper, 1893.
- Erläuterungs-Bericht zum Entwurfe für einen General-Regulierungsplan über das gesammte Gemeindegebiet von Wien [Explanatory report on the drafts of a general regulation plan for the entire municipal area of Vienna]. Vienna: Schroll, 1894.
- Erläuterungen zu dem Concurrenz-Project für die Verwendung der Rotunde bei der im Jahre 1898 geplanten Ausstellung [Explanations of the concurrence project for the use of the rotunda at the exhibition planned in 1898]. Vienna: Friedrich Jasper, 1896.
- Die Handels- und Gewerbekammer für Niederösterreich in Wien [The Chamber of Commerce for Lower Austria in Vienna]. In: Der Architekt. Wiener Monatshefte für Bauwesen und dekorative Kunst. vol. 14 (1908), pp. 12–14, OBV . - Text online. ( ANNO ).
- Mein Lebenslauf und meine Tätigkeit [My Resume and My Job]. Vienna: Rosenbaum, 1931.
