= Italian administrative law =

Italian administrative law is an arm of administrative jurisdiction in the law of the Republic of Italy. The Italian administrative law is responsible for judging appeals brought against administrative acts by private individuals who consider themselves harmed (in a manner not in conformity with the legal system) in their own legitimate interest. These are administrative judges of first instance, whose sentences are appealable before the Council of State.

== History ==
The establishment of administrative tribunals of first instance in the regional district is required by the Constitution of Italy (Art. 125). However, the tribunals were only established on 6 December 1971, after the disappearance of the jurisdiction of the Provincial Administrative Councils, which had been declared unconstitutional.

The 1971 law did not limit itself to filling the void created in the legal system by the councils' abolition. The law established jurisdictional bodies with limited competence in relation to entities and matters, but has generalized the double degree in administrative jurisdiction. On every act of any public administration (including the state one), the TAR (Regional Administrative Court) now judges in the first instance, while the Council of State (which until the establishment of the regional courts normally judged in a single instance) is called to rule only on appeal.
