= Embassy of Austria, Washington, D.C. =

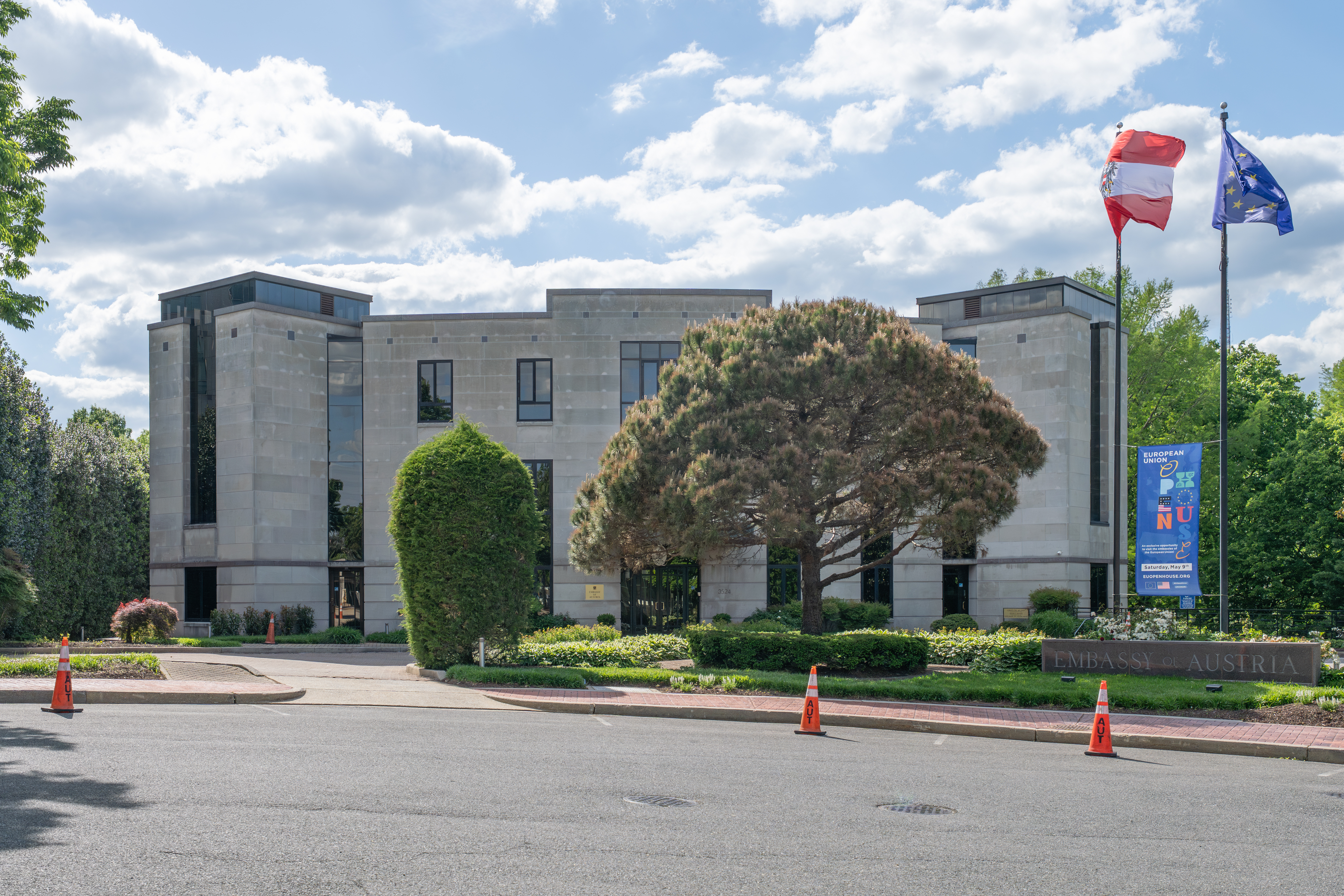
- The Embassy of Austria in Washington, D.C.
- Location: Washington, D.C., U.S.
- Address: 3524 International Court, N.W.
- Coordinates: 38°56′43.4″N 77°4′9.1″W
- Ambassador: Petra Schneebauer
- Website: http://www.austria.org

The Embassy of Austria in Washington, D.C., is the primary diplomatic mission of the Republic of Austria to the United States and represent the interests of Austria and Austrian citizens in the U.S. It is located at 3524 International Court, NW, Washington, D.C., in a neighborhood primarily occupied by diplomatic missions. Its immediate neighbors are the Embassy of Slovakia, the Embassy of the United Arab Emirates, and the Embassy of Egypt. The chancery building houses and operates several services and offices relevant to the pursuit of its mission in the United States.

The Ambassador of Austria to the United States is Petra Schneebauer, who took office in March 2023.

Austria's former embassy on Massachusetts Avenue was sold in 1993, and is now the Embassy of Croatia.

== Services ==
The chancery building is home to the ambassador's office, the consular section, the embassy's economic and political departments, and the following offices:

=== Austrian Press and Information Service in the United States ===
"Austrian Information", published by the embassy

The Austrian Press and Information Service acts as the embassy's press and public diplomacy office. Founded in 1948 as part of the Austrian Consulate General in New York City, the service moved and integrated its offices into the Austrian Embassy in Washington, D.C., in 1992. It publishes a quarterly zine, Austrian Information, in printed and electronic format, as well as "Jewish News from Austria", a translation of Austrian media reports on Jewish life in Austria, in electronic format.

The service publishes a monthly, electronic newsletter, the Austrian Dispatch, and is responsible for two embassy websites, Taste of Austria and Culture Space and "Project 175" and the embassy's social media accounts on Facebook, Pinterest, and Twitter.

=== Austrian Cultural Forum ===
The Austrian Cultural Forum Washington, D.C., is one of Austria’s two cultural representation offices in the United States; the other is in New York City. It was created with the objective of serving as a focus of cultural exchange between Austrians, Europeans, and Americans. It is an agency of the Austrian Federal Ministry for Europe, Integration and Foreign Affairs and is integrated into the Austrian Embassy in Washington, D.C.

Its objectives are:

- Presenting contemporary, innovative artistic and scientific achievements in a broad range of discipline;
- Providing a platform for presentations of emerging artists who have their life and career centered in Austria;
- Creating interfaces and promoting interaction between Austrian/European and American cultural institutions and artists;
- Acting as a forum for dialogue and discourse on relevant issues in culture and politics;
- Promoting and highlighting cultural and scientific contributions from or about Austria.

The Austrian Cultural Forum organizes and supports a variety of cultural events, including concerts, film screenings, exhibitions, theatre, lectures, panel discussions, and symposia, most of which take place in the Atrium of the Austrian Embassy. Most events at the embassy are open to the public and free of charge.

=== Office of Science and Technology ===
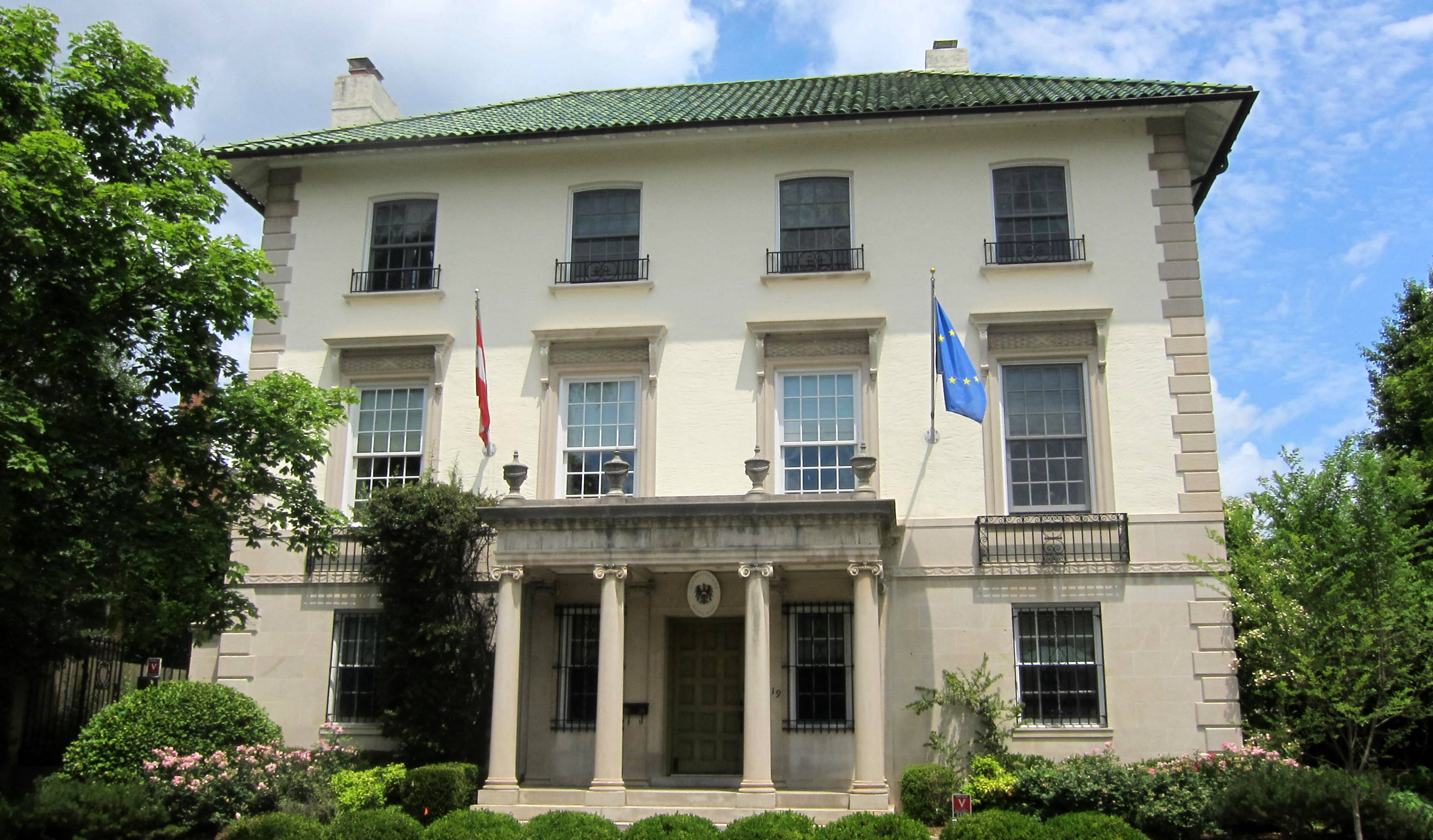
The Austrian ambassador's residence, designed by Appleton P. Clark Jr. in 1926

The Office of Science & Technology (OSTA) at the Embassy of Austria in Washington, D.C., acts as a strategic interface in the areas of higher education, science, research, and innovation policy between Austria and North America. It provides information on science and technology and higher education trends and policy in Austria, Europe, and North America with its online magazine bridges. It also promotes transatlantic cooperation through support and advice on initiating research and development cooperation between institutions in Austria and North America. It supports and connects Austrian scientists in North America through the Research and Innovation Network Austria.

=== Commercial section ===
The commercial section of the embassy is not housed in the chancery building, but located at 818 18th Street, NW, Suite 500, in Washington, D.C., 20006. Its tasks include:

- business development for Austrian companies vis-a-vis the International Financial Institutions
- trade policy issues between Austria and the United States
- public procurement, particularly in the military and homeland security sectors
- export control issues and US sanctions' policies,
- cooperation with interest groups, associations, and chambers in Washington, D.C.

== Consulates ==
There are two Austrian consulates-general and one consulate in the United States located in Los Angeles, New York City and San Francisco.

Honorary consulates exist in Anchorage, Atlanta, Boston, Chicago, Cincinnati, Dallas, Denver, Detroit, Honolulu, Houston, Las Vegas, Miami, New Orleans, Orlando, Philadelphia, Phoenix, Pittsburgh, Portland, Richmond, St. Louis, Saint Paul, Saint Thomas (U.S. Virgin Islands), Salt Lake City, San Juan, Seattle, Spartanburg, and Tampa.

== See also ==
- Austrian Ambassador to the United States
- Austria–United States relations
