= Arthur Fisher (real estate broker) =

US Ambassador to Austria

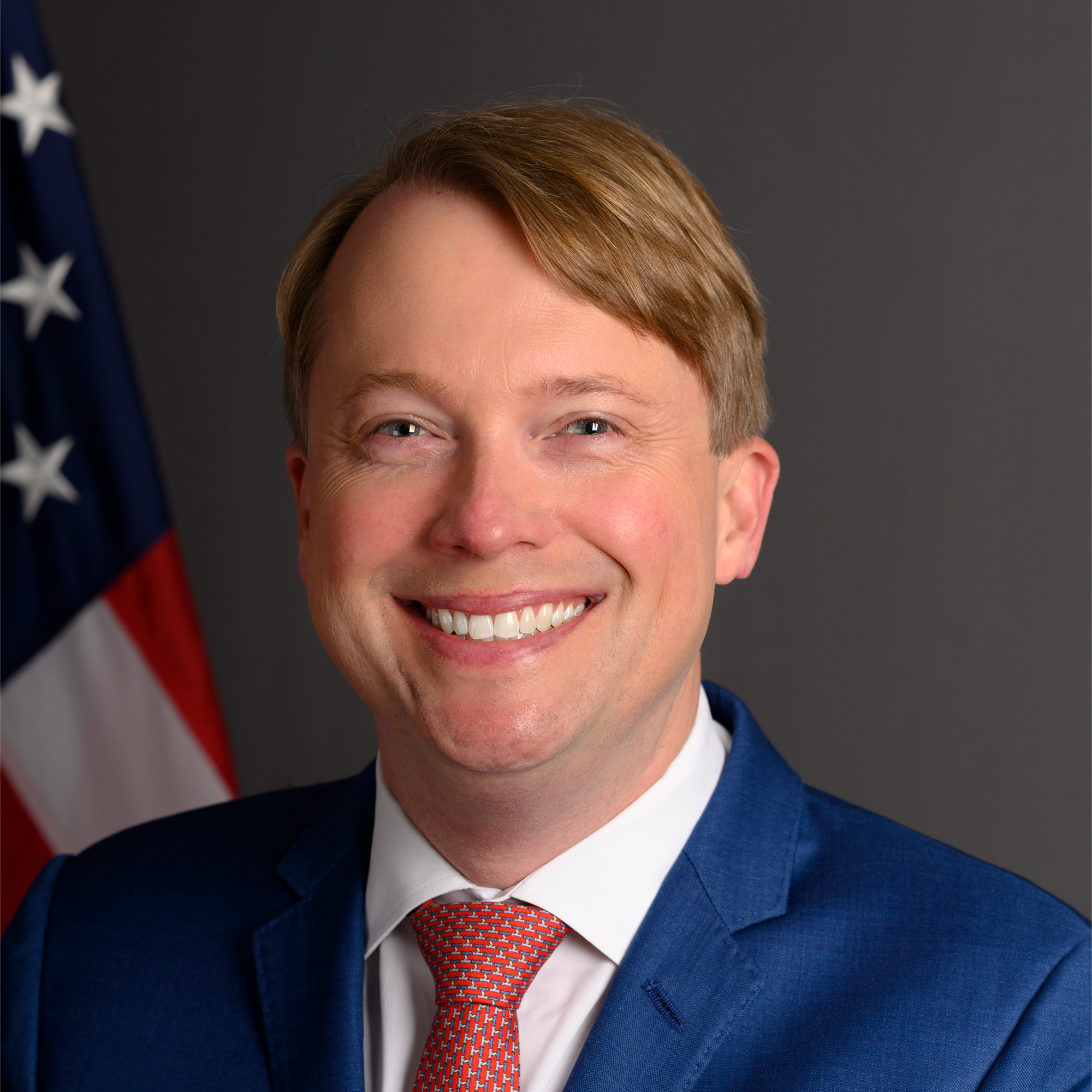
- Official portrait, 2025

53rd United States Ambassador to Austria
- Incumbent
- Assumed office November 19, 2025
- President: Donald Trump
- Preceded by: Victoria Reggie Kennedy

Personal details
- Born: Arthur Graham Fisher; 1975 (age 50–51)
- Education: College of Charleston (BS, BA)

Arthur Graham Fisher (born 1975) is an American businessman and diplomat who serves as the United States ambassador to Austria.

== Early life, education and private life ==
Fisher attended the College of Charleston, where he earned a bachelor of science in business administration and a bachelor of arts in corporate communications. While in college, he served as president of the Association of Collegiate Entrepreneurs, vice president of the Interfraternity Council, and a delegate to the Harvard University Model United Nations.

== Career ==
Fisher joined his family’s real estate business after completing his education. He is the president of Fisher Realty, a firm founded in 1977, which operates multiple offices in North Carolina. The company focuses on residential and commercial properties in Transylvania County.

In addition to his business career, Fisher has been involved in civic and community organizations. He is a trustee of Brevard College and The Pisgah Health Foundation, a board member of United Community Bank, and a North Carolina Senate appointee to the state’s Travel and Tourism Board. He has also served on the boards of Transylvania Vocational Services and the Boys & Girls Club at both local and state levels.

== US ambassador to Austria ==
On December 16, 2024, President-elect Donald Trump announced his intent to nominate Fisher as the next United States ambassador to Austria, subject to confirmation by the U.S. Senate. He was officially nominated for the position in March 2025.

Fisher testified before the U.S. Senate Committee on Foreign Relations about his nomination in June 2025.

In October 2025, the Senate confirmed Fisher's nomination. He arrived in Austria in November 2025.
