= Indiana Law Journal =

- Discipline: Law
- Language: English

Publication details
- History: 1925–present
- Publisher: Indiana University Maurer School of Law (United States)
- Frequency: Quarterly

Standard abbreviations
- Bluebook: Ind. L.J.
- ISO 4: Indiana Law J.

Indexing
- ISSN: 0019-6665
- OCLC no.: 34268353

Links
- Journal homepage; Online archive

The Indiana Law Journal is a general law review founded in 1925. It is published quarterly by students of the Indiana University Maurer School of Law at the flagship Bloomington campus. One of the ten most-cited law review articles of all time was published by the Indiana Law Journal; this was written by Robert Bork.

The Journal has published an online supplement, the Indiana Law Journal Supplement, since 2008.

== History ==
In 1898, the Indiana State Bar Association (ISBA) briefly published a periodical entitled the Indiana Law Journal. It was sent to all ISBA members, and included short essays, local news, and digests of cases at both the state and federal level. It was published for less than two years, and production ceased in June 1899. In 1925, the ISBA teamed up with the Indiana University School of Law to re-create the Indiana Law Journal. The journal came under the full control of the Indiana University School of Law in July 1948, with complete editorial independence of the student editorial board. The ISBA withdrew its financial support for the journal in 1958, because the Association had started its own publication, Res Gestae.

== Addison Harris Lecture Series ==
By the bequest of India Crago Harris, a trust in honor of her husband, Addison C. Harris, was established to fund a public lecture series at Indiana University Bloomington's Maurer School of Law. The first lectures in this series were delivered in 1949. Several of them have been published in the Indiana Law Journal, including Chief Justice Earl Warren's keynote address in 1957 at the dedication ceremonies for the new Law School building. More recently, Jack Balkin of Yale Law School delivered "The Recent Unpleasantness: Understanding the Cycles of Constitutional Time", on September 13, 2017.

Addison C. Harris was admitted to the bar in 1865, following his graduation from Western Christian University (present-day Butler University) in 1862 and law studies with Indiana Supreme Court Justice Samuel E. Perkins. Harris became a prominent Indianapolis lawyer, a member of the Indiana Senate (1876 to 1880), and served as U.S. Envoy Extraordinary and Minister Plenipotentiary (ambassador) to Austria-Hungary (1899 to 1901) during President William McKinley's administration. In addition, Harris was a founder and president (1899 to 1904) of the Indiana Law School, which was a forerunner to the Indiana University Robert H. McKinney School of Law in Indianapolis, and president of the Indiana State Bar Association (1904), among his other civic contributions.

== Notable contributors ==
Some notable contributors to the journal include Justice Hugo Black, Robert Bork, Archibald Cox, John Hart Ely, Leon Green, Frank Michelman, Martha Minow, Richard Posner, Chief Justice William H. Rehnquist, Cass Sunstein, Laurence Tribe, Chief Justice Fred Vinson, and Seth P. Waxman.
