= McCaw =

McCaw is a surname. Notable people with the surname include:

- Bill McCaw (1927–2025), New Zealand rugby player
- Bill McCaw (American football) (1898–1942), American football player
- Caroline McCaw, New Zealand design academic
- Chris McCaw (born 1971), American photographer
- Craig McCaw (born 1949), American businessman, ex-husband of Wendy McCaw
- J. Elroy McCaw (1911–1969), American businessman
- John McCaw Jr. (born c. 1951), American businessman
- Kenneth McCaw (1907–1989), Australian politician
- Patrick McCaw (born 1995), American basketball player
- Richie McCaw (born 1980), New Zealand rugby player
- Sean (Allen) McCaw (born 1973), American basketball player
- Susan McCaw (born 1962), American politician, ambassador to Austria; current wife of Craig McCaw
- Wendy McCaw (born 1951), American journalist and owner of the Santa Barbara News-Press; ex-wife of Craig McCaw

== See also ==
- William MacCaw (1850–1928), British politician
- McCaw Hall, opera house in Seattle, named after the mother of donor Craig McCaw
- McCaw Cellular, former telecommunication company founded by Craig McCaw
