= Helene von Damm =

Austrian-born American diplomat

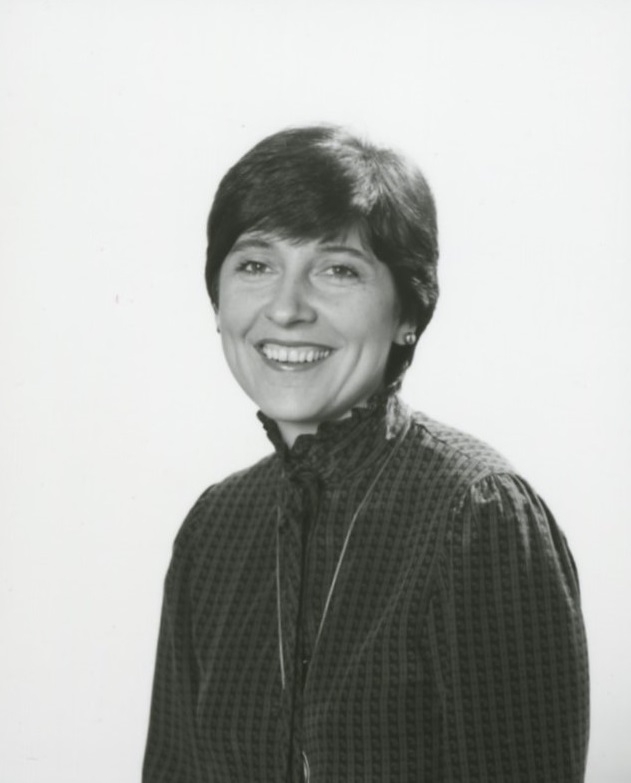
- 1982 portrait

United States Ambassador to Austria
- In office May 10, 1983 – January 15, 1986
- President: Ronald Reagan
- Preceded by: Theodore E. Cummings
- Succeeded by: Ronald S. Lauder

Personal details
- Born: Helene Antonia Winter; May 4, 1938 (age 88) Linz, Austria
- Party: Republican
- Spouse(s): Charles McDonald; Christian von Damm; Byron Leeds; Peter Gürtler
- Domestic partner: Jürgen Wilke
- Occupation: Diplomat, author

Helene Antonia von Damm (née Winter; born May 4, 1938) is an Austrian-born American diplomat who served as U.S. Ambassador to Austria, and also worked as an assistant to President Ronald Reagan.

== Early life ==
Helene Antonia von Damm, born Helene Antonia Winter in Linz (Austria) in 1938, grew up in Ulmerfeld-Hausmening (now part of Amstetten, Austria), where her father worked as engineer (German title: Betriebsingenieur) at the Neusiedler Papierfabrik, which was part of the Neusiedler AG, now Mondi, since 1918). She had a tumultuous childhood, marked by the Second World War, the post-war Soviet occupation, and the death of her father from tuberculosis when she was twelve years old. She recalled that she "had a difficult time digesting" the things she witnessed as a child, and dreamed of "a better life in places far away."

In 1958, von Damm married a U.S. Army corporal named Charles McDonald and emigrated to the United States. In 1959, the couple settled in Detroit, where she found work as a typist and immersed herself in politics.

== Career ==
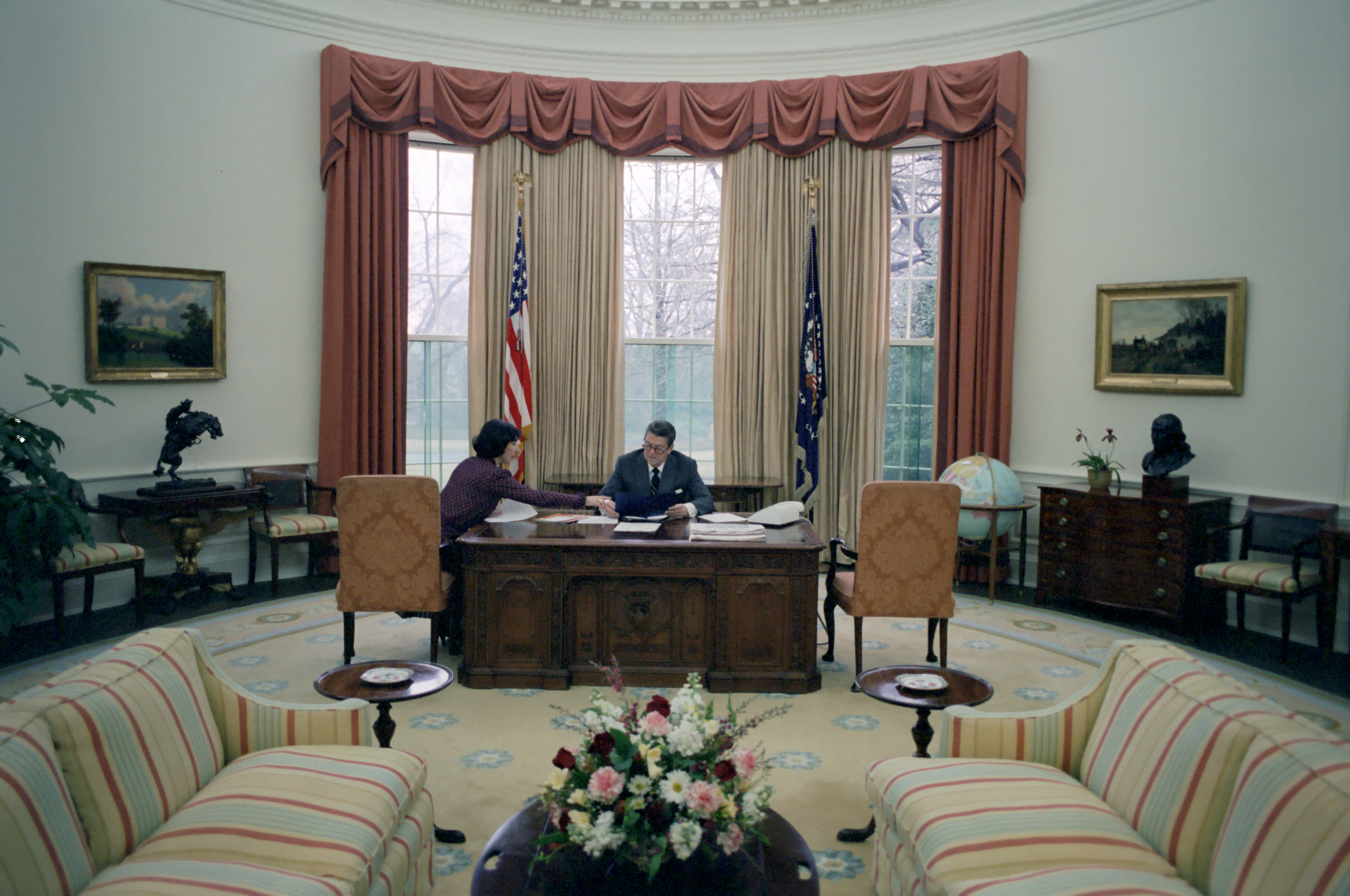
Von Damm with President Reagan on his first day in the Oval Office, 1981

Following her 1964 divorce from McDonald, von Damm moved to Chicago and worked as a secretary for the American Medical Political Action Committee. It was in that role that she first met Ronald Reagan during a speech in 1965.

Von Damm was deeply critical of President Lyndon Johnson's Great Society, and was attracted to Reagan's political vision. ″Reagan was one of the few people who spoke totally differently ... He made a lot of sense to someone who had just come from socialism. Johnson wanted to change things back to what I'd left. I resolved that if Reagan ever ran for office, I'd try to get on his team″, she said.

Von Damm moved to California in 1966 to work for Reagan's gubernatorial campaign. She started as a scheduling assistant, and in 1969 was appointed as his personal secretary. She continued working with Reagan through his two terms as governor. She then served as his executive assistant during his business years, and as a finance director for nine northeastern states during the 1980 Presidential campaign. After Reagan was elected president, von Damm was named Director for Presidential Personnel and held that position for two years until 1983.

Von Damm was appointed US Ambassador to Austria in 1983. She served for just over two years before resigning in 1986.

== Personal life ==
Von Damm divorced her first husband in 1964, after growing restless with what she described as her former husband's lack of ambition. In 1971 she was remarried to Christian von Damm, a Bank of America executive of German descent. The marriage did not last, as von Damm notes that she had difficulty reconciling her demanding career with domestic life.

Von Damm married her third husband Byron Leeds in 1981. Leeds, a Morris County, New Jersey computer industry consultant, had been an old friend. However, he remained in New Jersey while she was working in Washington. Following her diplomatic appointment to Austria, the couple grew further apart, and they divorced soon after. While in Austria she married her fourth husband, Peter Gürtler, owner of Vienna's luxurious Sacher Hotel (himself very recently divorced).

The relationship became a subject of public fascination, and eventually von Damm decided to signal her intention to resign. In June 1985 she cabled a resignation letter to Washington, indicating that it was ″the interests of our country″ that she step down.

Von Damm left her post in 1986, and divorced Guertler the next year. He committed suicide in 1990. Since the year 2000 up until his death on May 27, 2016, she lived in her Vienna flat with the German actor Jürgen Wilke (de:Jürgen Wilke).

== List of positions ==
- US Ambassador to Austria (1983–86)
- White House Staff Assistant to the President for Presidential Personnel (1982–83)
- White House Staff Director of Presidential Personnel (1981–82)
- United Service Organization World Board of Governors (past)
- Coro Foundation Public Affairs Leadership training
- American Medical Association Secretary, AMA PAC (1965)

== Publications ==
- Von Damm, Helene (1976). Sincerely Ronald Reagan. Ottawa, Illinois: Green Hill Publishers. ISBN 978-0-916-05405-2.
- Von Damm, Helene (1987). Wirf die Angst weg, Helene: Die Erinnerungen der Helene von Damm (in German). Vienna: Neff. ISBN 978-3-7014-0241-0.
- Von Damm, Helene (1989). At Reagan's Side: Twenty Years in the Political Mainstream. New York: Doubleday. ISBN 978-0-385-24445-9.

== Filmography ==
- 2011, July 19: Sommerzeit — late afternoon TV-magazin at ORF 2
- 2018, Mai 3: Stöckl. — late night talk with Barbara Stöckl at ORF 2
- 2018, September 15: Alte Feinde – Neue Freunde. ″Terrassengespräche″ über den Kalten Krieg. Die Nachbarn: Helene von Damm – Personalchefin von Ronald Reagan. Sergei Mikheyev – Dolmetscher von Michail Gorbatschow. Directed and produced by Robert Dornhelm for ORF III

Diplomatic posts
Preceded by Theodore E. Cummings	U.S. Ambassador to Austria; 1983–1986	Succeeded by Ronald S. Lauder
