= India Crago Harris =

American art patron and civic leader

- Born: 1848
- Died: 1948
- Resting place: Crown Hill Cemetery, Indianapolis, Indiana, United States of America
- Education: North Western Christian University (Butler University)
- Board member of: Art Association of Indianapolis
- Spouse: Addison C. Harris

India Crago Harris (1848–1948), a native Connersville, Indiana, United States, was an art patron and civic leader in Indianapolis, Indiana, who served on the Art Association of Indianapolis's board of trustees, including roles as recording secretary (1893–1899) and its fifth president (1904–1907). The Art Association was the predecessor to the Indianapolis Museum of Art and the Indiana University – Purdue University Indianapolis's Herron School of Art and Design). During her tenure as president, Harris laid the cornerstone for the association's first new building, named the John Herron Art Institute, at 16th and Pennsylvania Streets. In addition, Harris established Herron's reference library. As the wife of Addison C. Harris (1840–1916), who was a prominent Indianapolis lawyer and a civic leader, she accompanied him to Vienna, Austria, during his diplomatic service as U.S. Envoy Extraordinary and Minister Plenipotentiary (ambassador) to Austria-Hungary (1899 to 1901).

== Early life and family ==
During the 1860s Crago enrolled at North Western Christian University (present-day Butler University) in Indianapolis, Indiana, where she met her future husband, Addison C. Harris, a native of Wayne County, Indiana. They were married on May 14, 1868. The couple had no children.

Addison Harris, an 1862 graduate of North Western Christian University, became a prominent lawyer in Indianapolis. He also served as a Republican member of the Indiana Senate (1876 to 1880) and as U.S. Envoy Extraordinary and Minister Plenipotentiary (ambassador) to Austria-Hungary (1899 to 1901). India Harris accompanied her husband to Vienna, Austria, during his diplomatic service. He was also active in Indiana's legal community as a founding member and president (1883 and 1890) of the Indianapolis Bar Association, a founder and president (1899 to 1904) of the Indiana Law School (a forerunner to the Indiana University Robert H. McKinney School of Law in Indianapolis), and president of the Indiana State Bar Association (1904). In his later years he served as a member of Purdue University's board of trustees (1905–1916), and as its president (1909 to 1916).

The couple's primary home was located on North Meridian Street in Indianapolis. Addison Harris also acquired property in rural Hamilton County, Indiana, in 1880 and later had the home remodelled and enlarged for the couple to use for entertaining and as a summer residence. The West-Harris House in Hamilton County was later nicknamed Ambassador House in reference to his diplomatic service.

== Career ==
Following her marriage, Harris studied law with her husband and assisted him in legal research; however, she is best known for her affiliation with the Art Association of Indianapolis, the forerunner to the Indianapolis Museum of Art and Indiana University – Purdue University Indianapolis's Herron School of Art and Design. India Crago Harris was among the first members of the Art Association when it was founded in 1883. She also served on its board of trustees, including roles as recording secretary (1893–1899) and as its fifth president (1904–1907). (Harris was the second woman to serve as the Art Association's president; May Wright Sewall, its founder, was president from 1893 to 1898.)

While Harris was serving as its president, the Art Association began construction on its new art museum and art school building at the corner of 16th and Pennsylvania Streets. During ceremonies held on November 25, 1905, she laid cornerstone for the two-story, Vonnegut and Bohn-designed building, which was named the John Herron Art Institute in honor of its major benefactor. The new building officially opened on November 20, 1906. Harris also established Herron's reference and served as chair of its library committee. In addition to her support of the Herron Art Institute, Harris was active in other civic affairs, including support of the Indianapolis Orphans Asylum and service on the board of the Children's Guardian Home.

== Later years ==
After her husband's death in 1916, Harris inherited the West-Harris House (Ambassador House), the couple's summer home in Hamilton County, Indiana. It served as Harris's primary residence after her Indianapolis home on North Meridian Street was demolished.

== Death and legacy ==
India Crago Harris died in 1948.

Harris is best known for her service as the fifth president and a board member of the Art Association of Indianapolis, which evolved into the present-day Indianapolis Museum of Art and Indiana University – Purdue University Indianapolis's Herron School of Art and Design. The old Herron Art Institute's building, where Harris laid the cornerstone in 1905, was demolished and replaced in 1928 with a new, Paul Philippe Cret-designed museum building. A modern, three-story wing designed by Evans Woollen III was constructed in 1962. These two historic buildings serve as the campus for the present-day Herron High School.

The Art Association commissioned Cecilia Beaux to paint a portrait of India Harris to hang in the Herron Art Museum. Although the Indianapolis Museum of Art relocated to a new site, the painting remains a part of its collection, as well as her court gowns and other personal items from her residence in Vienna, Austria, from 1899 to 1901.

Harris bequeathed to Indiana University the Hamilton County property she inherited from her husband. She also left instructions to sell the property and use the proceeds to establish a trust to support a law lecture series in her husband's honor. The Addison C. Harris Memorial Lecture continues to bring prominent legal scholars to Indiana for public lectures at the Indiana University Maurer School of Law in Bloomington, Indiana. The first lectures in the series were delivered in 1949; Professor Jack Balkin, Yale Law School, delivered "The Recent Unpleasantness: Understanding the Cycles of Constitutional Time," on September 13, 2017.

To prevent its demolition the Town (present-day City) of Fishers, Indiana, supervised the relocation of Harris's summer home in Hamilton County from its original location at 96th Street and Allisonville Road to 106th Street and Eller Road (present-day Heritage Park at White River) in 1996. The West-Harris House (also known as Ambassador House) was listed on the National Register of Historic Places in 1999. The restored home is operated as a local history museum and a site for community events and private rentals.

== Sources ==
- "Addison Harris: Indianapolis Man Receives Appointment as Ambassador". Muncie Morning News. Vol. 21, no. 220. January 11, 1899. p. 1.
- Balkin, Jack M. (July 29, 2018). "The Recent Unpleasantness: Understanding the Cycles of Constitutional Time". Yale Law School, Public Law Research Paper Number 648. Indiana Law Journal. SSRN 3222311.
- Bodenhamer, David J., and Robert G. Barrows, eds. (1994). The Encyclopedia of Indianapolis. Bloomington and Indianapolis: Indiana University Press. ISBN 0-253-31222-1.
- "Fishers Heritage Park at White River". City of Fishers, Indiana.
- "History". Herron High School. Archived from the original on October 3, 2018.
- Johnson, Thomas Robert, and Helen Hand (1940). The Trustees and the Officers of Purdue University, 1865–1940. Archives of Purdue. Vol. 1. West Lafayette, Indiana: Purdue University. pp. 231–32. OCLC 6059208.
- "Maurer School of Law: Addison Harris Lecture" (PDF). Indiana University Bloomington.
- Monks, Leander J., Logan Esarey, and Ernest V. Shockley (1916). Courts and Lawyers of Indiana. Vol. 3. Indianapolis: Federal Publishing Company. pp. 1306–07. OCLC 4158945.
- "National Register Digital Assets: West-Harris House". NPGallery: Digital Asset Management System. National Park Service, U. S. Department of the Interior.
- McKee, Ann Milkovitch, and Carol Ann Schweikert (March 26, 1997). "National Register of Historic Places Inventory Nomination Form: West-Harris House" (PDF).
- "Newfields: History". Newfields (Indianapolis Museum of Art). Archived from the original on March 15, 2023.
- Reed, George Irving (1899). Encyclopedia of Biography of Indiana. Vol. 1. Chicago: Century Publishing and Engraving Company. pp. 27–29. OCLC 5218775.
- Robinson, Anne P., and S. B. Berry (2008). Every Way Possible: 125 Years of the Indianapolis Museum of Art. Indianapolis, Indiana: Indianapolis Museum of Art. ISBN 9780936260853.
- Seeds, Russell Marlbourough (1899). History of the Republican Party of Indiana: Biographical Sketches of the Party Leaders. Vol. 1. Indianapolis: Indiana History Company. p. 129. OCLC 880652821.
- Shepherd, Rebecca A. (1980). A Biographical Directory of the Indiana General Assembly. Vol. 1. Indianapolis: Select Committee on the Centennial History of the Indiana General Assembly; Indiana Historical Bureau. p. 168. OCLC 6263491.
- Taylor, Charles W. (1895). Biographical Sketches and Review of the Bench and Bar of Indiana. Indianapolis, Indiana: Bench and Bar Publishing Company. p. 257, 259. OCLC 2503866.
- Tuohy, John (July 26, 2007). "Progress being made on Ambassador House" (PDF). Indianapolis Star. Archived from the original (PDF) on December 13, 2013.
- Warkel, Harriet G.; Martin F. Krause; S. L. Berry (2003). The Herron Chronicle. Bloomington: Indiana University Press. ISBN 9780253342379.
