= Lyons Brown Jr. =

American diplomat and businessman (1936–2024)

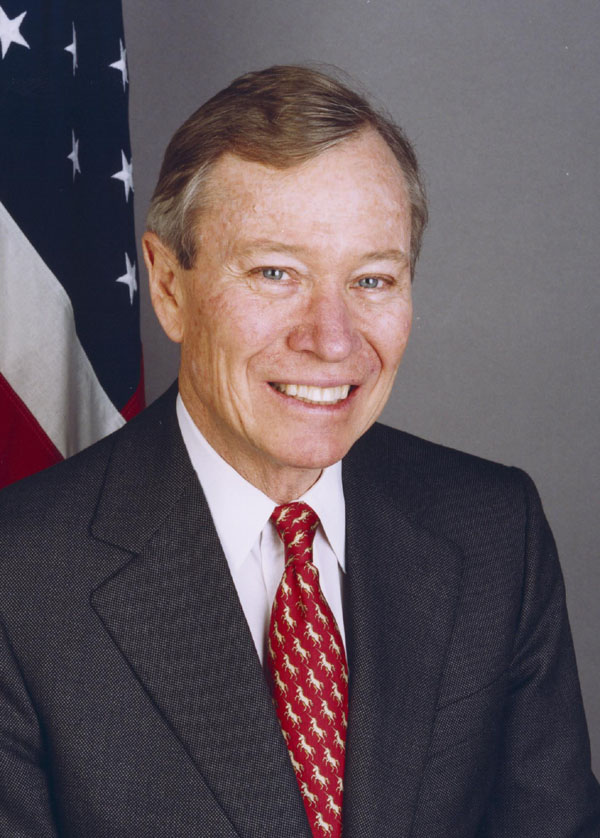
- Official portrait, 2002

United States Ambassador to Austria
- In office November 5, 2001 – October 5, 2005
- President: George W. Bush
- Preceded by: Kathryn Walt Hall
- Succeeded by: Susan McCaw

Personal details
- Born: William Lee Lyons Brown Jr. August 2, 1936 Louisville, Kentucky, U.S.
- Died: June 9, 2024 (aged 87)
- Education: University of Virginia; Arizona State University

William Lee Lyons Brown Jr. (August 2, 1936 – June 9, 2024) was an American diplomat and businessman who served as the U.S. Ambassador to Austria. He was also the CEO and Honorary Trustee of the Metropolitan Museum of Art, and Chair of the World Monuments Fund.

Brown was born in Louisville, Kentucky. A graduate of the University of Virginia and the American Graduate School of International Management (now called Thunderbird School of Global Management), he was the president, chairman, CEO, and a director of the Brown-Forman Corporation, founded by his great-grandfather. He served on the President's Advisory Committee for Trade Policy and Negotiations as an appointee under three Presidents: Ronald Reagan (1988), George H. W. Bush (1990 and 1992) and Bill Clinton (1994).

Brown was made a Chevalier de L'Ordre du Merite Agricole by the French government in 1974. He died on June 9, 2024, at the age of 87.
