= William Eacho =

American diplomat (born 1954)

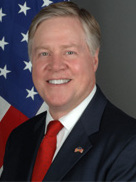

United States Ambassador to Austria
- In office September 14, 2009 – August 3, 2013
- President: Barack Obama
- Preceded by: David Girard-diCarlo
- Succeeded by: Alexa L. Wesner

Personal details
- Born: 1954 (age 71–72)
- Education: Duke University; Harvard Business School

William Carlton Eacho III (born 1954) is the former United States Ambassador to Austria. Eacho was nominated by President Barack Obama in June 2009. He was confirmed by the US Senate and sworn in during August 2009. He succeeded David F. Girard-diCarlo as ambassador in 2009 and was succeeded by Alexa Wesner in September 2013. Eacho served as Chair or Co-Chair at IFES from 2023 through 2025 , The International Foundation for Electoral Systems. Eacho is a co-founder and CEO of The Partnership For Responsible Growth, a bipartisan organization advocating for US legislation for a price on carbon emissions to counter the climate change threat. Eacho also serves as Board Chair at Friends of Acadia and as Treasurer and Board of Trustees member at the American-Austrian Foundation From 2014 through 2020, Eacho was a Visiting Professor of the Practice at the Sanford School of Public Policy at Duke University. From 2013 to 2018, Ambassador Eacho was also affiliated with the Center for Transatlantic Relations as a Distinguished Fellow, as well as visiting scholar at the Johns Hopkins University Paul H. Nitze School of Advanced International Studies, with an expertise in global energy, environment, and security issues. He formerly served on the Energy and Security Task Force of the International Peace Institute.

== Personal life ==
Eacho graduated magna cum laude from Duke University with a degree in Law and the Economy, a self-designed major combining political science and economics. Prior to attending Harvard Business School, from which he graduated with Distinction in 1979, he was a Financial Analyst in the Corporate Finance department of Hornblower & Weeks, in New York City, and was an associate with Loeb, Rhoades, Hornblower & Company in Los Angeles.

Eacho was one of Obama's biggest campaign fundraisers, and he helped raise over $500,000. Eacho and his immediate family also donated $226,000 to federal politics in 2007-08, according to the OpenSecrets, a non-profit, nonpartisan research group based in Washington, D.C. that tracks the effects of money and lobbying on elections and public policy.

He and his wife, Donna, have three sons.

== Professional ==
William Eacho was Chief Executive Officer (CEO) of Carlton Capital Group, LLC in Bethesda, Maryland until 2009. He had previously served as the Executive Vice President of Alliant Foodservice Inc., then a $6 billion national foodservice distributor. He served on three boards – Stanley Martin Companies, Inc., Bialek Corporation, Inc. and the Boys & Girls Club of Greater Washington. Eacho also previously served on the Board of Visitors of Duke University's Trinity College of Arts and Sciences, on the Board of Trustees of Landon School, and has been a member of World President's Organization and Chief Executives Organization. Following a long-standing tradition established by previous U.S. ambassadors, he was also an ex officio member on the board of directors of the Salzburg Global Seminar from 2009 to 2013, was elected to full board membership in 2013, and served until 2017, when he was named a Senior Fellow.

Eacho serves on the board of directors of Friends of Acadia and the American-Austrian Foundation.

On September 24, 2013, Austrian Federal President Heinz Fischer awarded Eacho the Grand Decoration of Honour for Services to the Republic of Austria in Gold with Sash, the first American ambassador to be so honored since Milton Wolf received it in 1980. The celebration was held at the residence of Martin Sajdik, Permanent Representative of Austria to the United Nations in New York.

Diplomatic posts
Preceded by David F. Girard-diCarlo	U.S. Ambassador to Austria; 2009–2013	Succeeded by Alexa L. Wesner
