= David F. Girard-diCarlo =

American lawyer

David F. Girard-DiCarlo
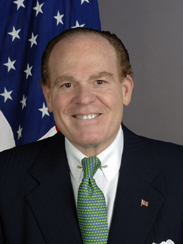
- Girard-diCarlo in June 2008

United States Ambassador to Austria
- In office September 10, 2008 – January 20, 2009
- President: George W. Bush
- Preceded by: Susan McCaw
- Succeeded by: William Eacho

Personal details
- Born: 1943 (age 82–83) Near Philadelphia, Pennsylvania, U.S.
- Party: Republican
- Occupation: Diplomat, lawyer

David F. Girard-diCarlo (born 1943) is an American lawyer and former diplomat.

== Early life and education ==
Girard-diCarlo was born near Philadelphia, in 1943. He received his bachelor's degree from Saint Joseph's University and studied law at the Villanova University School of Law.

== Career ==
After completing law school, he began his career as an associate with Wolf Block LLP, before moving on to Dilworth Paxon LLP, where he became a partner. He left Dilworth to take the position of chairman of the SEPTA before returning to the law firm in 1991.

In 1992, Girard-diCarlo began his work for Blank Rome LLP, where he served for 16 years as managing partner and CEO, eventually holding the position of chairman for six years. He was also appointed as the CEO of subsidiary Blank Rome Government Relations LLC, the lobbying branch of the law firm based in Washington, D.C.

In 2000, he was chairman of the Bush-Cheney election campaign in Pennsylvania.

In 2002 and 2003, he was named to the PoliticsPA list of "Sy Snyder's Power 50" list of politically influential individuals.

David F. Girard-diCarlo was nominated as the U.S. ambassador to Austria following Susan McCaw's resignation from the post. He was confirmed by the United States Congress on June 27, 2008. He was sworn in by Secretary of State Condoleezza Rice on July 1, and arrived in Vienna on July 3, 2008 to host the July 4th reception in his future residence.

On December 10, 2008, the Ambassador announced his intention to resign from the post following the inauguration of Barack Obama on January 20, 2009.

Girard-diCarlo has been a major contributor to Republican Party campaigns, including most recently the presidential campaign of John McCain.

Diplomatic posts
Preceded by Susan McCaw	U.S. Ambassador to Austria; 2008–2009	Succeeded by William Eacho
