= Alexa L. Wesner =

American diplomat (born 1972)

Alexa Wesner
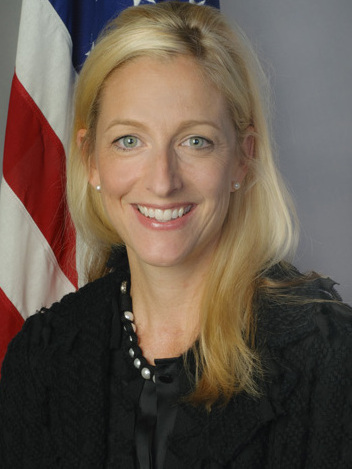

United States Ambassador to Austria
- In office October 22, 2013 – January 20, 2017
- President: Barack Obama
- Preceded by: William Eacho
- Succeeded by: Trevor Traina

Personal details
- Born: May 4, 1972 (age 54) Washington, D.C., U.S.
- Education: Stanford University

Alexa Lange Wesner (born May 4, 1972) is the former United States ambassador to Austria. She was nominated by President Barack Obama on July 27, 2013, and presented with her credentials on October 22, 2013. Her term ended on January 20, 2017.

== Biography ==
Alexa Wesner was born in Washington, D.C., and grew up in Reston, Virginia. The daughter of immigrant parents from Germany and Latvia, she was the first in her family to attend a U.S. high school and university. She was a high school All-American in track and cross country, ranking second in the nation in the 1600 and 3200 meter events.

Alexa graduated in 1994 from Stanford University with a degree in Biology before moving to Austin, Texas to join Trilogy Software. Three years later, she founded HireTECH, a recruiting and consulting company focused on high-tech start-ups, also serving as president and CEO. In 2000, she started Recruiting Labs, a web-based recruiting venture.

After a successful career as a high-tech chief executive and entrepreneur, Ms. Wesner turned her attention to politics and community development as both a fundraiser and a hands-on entrepreneur driving progressive causes on national, regional, and local levels. In local and state venues, Ms. Wesner was the founder of Blue Texas, a general purpose PAC to help restore a Democratic majority to the Texas State Legislature. She raised over $1 million in support of local candidates in just under two months.

In 2009, Alexa founded Be One Texas and four other state-based organizations (The Texas Civic Engagement Table, Engage Texas, Progress Texas, and the Texas Research Institute) designed to provide a lasting progressive infrastructure in Texas. The spectrum of activities spanned civic engagement, organizational collaboration, voter empowerment, voter turn-out, primary research and both direct and collaborative messaging. Her ambitious efforts earned support from various national foundations and unions.

Nationally, Alexa was an early supporter of Barack Obama's Senate campaign and ultimately became a member of his National Finance Committee for President. She was appointed to the President's Committee on the Arts and Humanities in 2009.

In 2013, President Obama appointed Wesner as the U.S. Ambassador to Austria and she served in that capacity until 2017. At the end of her term, the Austrian government awarded her the “Grand Decoration in Gold with Sash”, the highest decoration for services to the country a non-national can receive.

Alexa's philanthropic passions and board seats have included organizations in the arts, homelessness, women in technology, film, girls and women's empowerment, sports, and under-served populations. She has served on the boards of Lifeworks (homeless youth), Breakthrough (a path to college for disadvantaged youth), Arthouse (contemporary art), The Blanton Museum of Art, GenAustin (raising self esteem in and empowering young girls) and the Austin Film Society. She has served on the board of advisors of the Austin Museum of Art, and the Downtown Austin Alliance's Parks Committee to preserve Austin's downtown parks and urban spaces.

Ms. Wesner is currently on the boards of the Nuclear Threat Initiative, the Salzburg Global Seminar, a think tank; and is Chairperson of the Salzburg Festival Society. She is a Strategic Advisor to NEXT Ventures, and an LP in Translunar One, a crypto-hedge fund. She remains politically involved, and continues to support Democratic Party candidates at regional and national levels.

Alexa is an avid triathlete, and in 2003, qualified for the World Triathlon Championships. She has three children, ages 19, 15, and 12, and resides in Aspen, Colorado.

== Family ==
Wesner has three children.

== See also ==
Diplomatic posts
Preceded by William Eacho	United States Ambassador to Austria; 2013–2017	Succeeded by Trevor Traina
