= Addison C. Harris =

American lawyer and politician

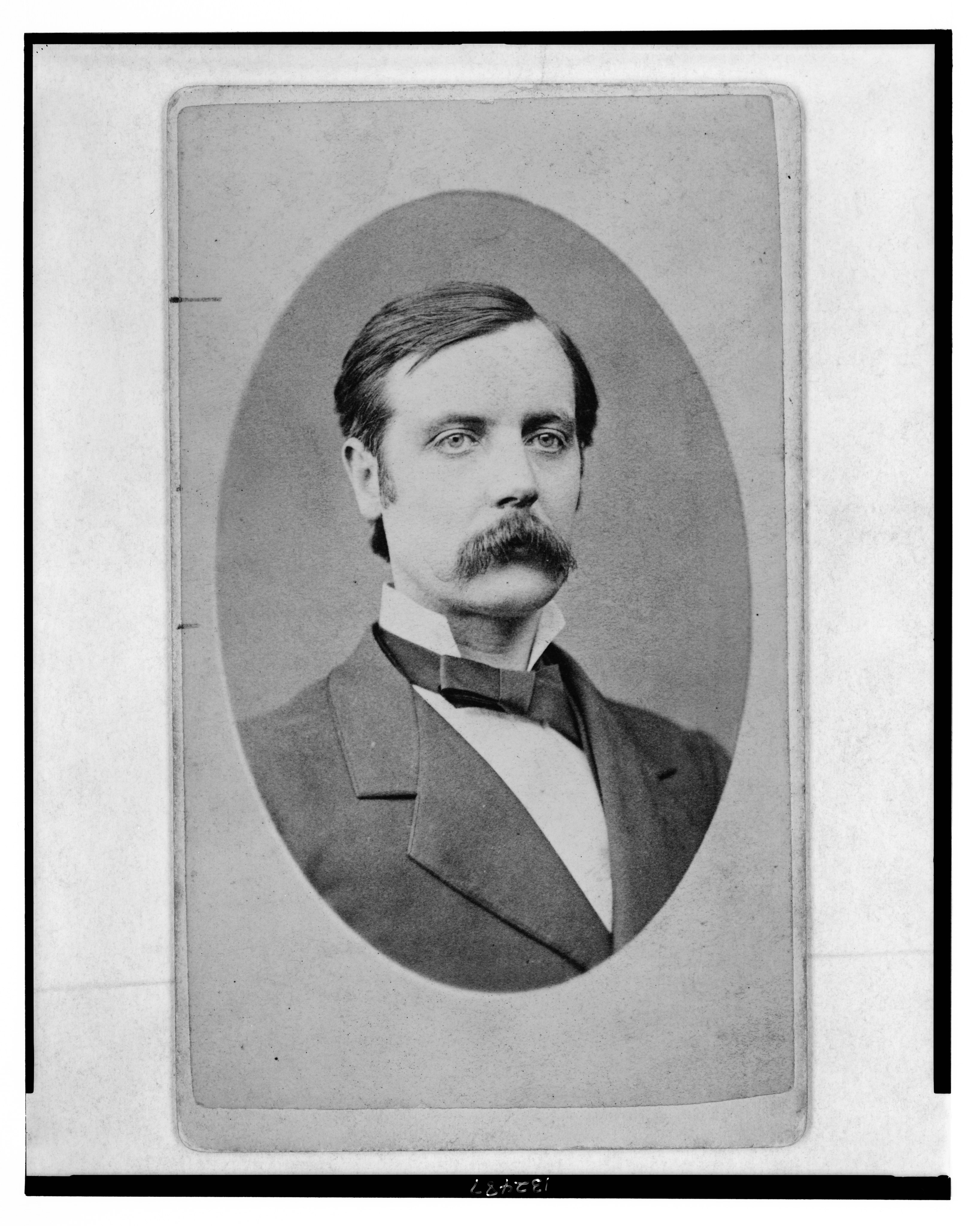
- Addison C. Harris, head-and-shoulders portrait, facing right

Indiana Senate
- In office 1876–1880

18th United States Minister to Austria-Hungary
- In office April 13, 1899 – April 29, 1901
- President: William McKinley
- Preceded by: Robert S. McCormick
- Succeeded by: Charlemagne Tower

Personal details
- Born: Addison Clay Harris; October 1, 1840 Wayne County, Indiana, US
- Died: September 2, 1916 (aged 75) Indianapolis, Indiana, US
- Resting place: Crown Hill Cemetery, Indianapolis, Indiana
- Party: Republican
- Spouse: India (Crago) Harris
- Education: North Western Christian University (present-day Butler University)
- Occupation: Lawyer, politician, and diplomat

Addison Clay Harris (October 1, 1840 – September 2, 1916) was a lawyer and civic leader in Indianapolis, Indiana, who served as a Republican member of the Indiana Senate (1876 to 1880) and a U.S. Envoy Extraordinary and Minister Plenipotentiary (ambassador) to Austria-Hungary (1899 to 1901). The Wayne County, Indiana, native graduated from Northwestern Christian University (present-day Butler University) in 1862 and was admitted to the bar in 1865, the same year he established a law partnership with John T. Dye in Indianapolis. Harris was a founding member (1878) and president (1883 and 1890) of the Indianapolis Bar Association; a founder and president (1899 to 1904) of the Indiana Law School, which was a forerunner to the Indiana University Robert H. McKinney School of Law in Indianapolis; a presidential elector in 1896; president of the Indiana State Bar Association (1904); a member (1905–1916) and president (1909 to 1916) of Purdue University's board of trustees; and a member of the Indiana Historical Society and the Columbia Club.

== Early life and education ==
Addison Clay Harris was born on October 1, 1840, in rural Wayne County, Indiana, and was one of Martha (Young) and Branson Lewis Harris's two sons. Branson Harris, a Wayne County farmer, also served in three sessions of the Indiana House of Representatives (1853, 1875, and 1877). Branson Harris's ancestors came to North America from Cornwall, United Kingdom; his father moved the family of Quakers from North Carolina to settle in Indiana.

Addison Harris received his early education in local Quaker schools near his Wayne County home. He enrolled at North Western Christian University (present-day Butler University) in 1860, and graduated two years later in 1862. After college he read law for three years at the Indianapolis firm of Barbour and Howland and studied under Indiana Supreme Court Justice Samuel E. Perkins.

== Marriage and family ==
Harris met his wife, India Crago (1848–1948) of Connersville, Indiana, when she came to Indianapolis to attend North Western Christian University. Harris and Crago were married on May 14, 1868. India Harris was active in the Art Association of Indianapolis, the forerunner to the Indianapolis Museum of Art and Indiana University – Purdue University Indianapolis's Herron School of Art and Design. She served on its board of trustees, which including leadership roles as recording secretary (1893–1899) and as its fifth president (1904–1907). The couple had no children.

Addison and India Harris's primary residence was located on North Meridian Street in Indianapolis. In addition to their Indianapolis home, Harris acquired property in rural Hamilton County, Indiana, in 1880 and later had the home on the site remodeled and enlarged to use as a summer residence. The West-Harris House in Hamilton County was later nicknamed Ambassador House in reference to his diplomatic service as a U.S. Envoy Extraordinary and Minister Plenipotentiary (ambassador) to Austria-Hungary from 1899 to 1901.

== Career ==
Harris was admitted to the bar in 1865 and established a law partnership with John T. Dye in Indianapolis, Indiana. They dissolved their fourteen-year partnership in 1879. Harris, who specialized in corporate law, continued to practice law on his own, becoming one of the state's prominent lawyers in the late nineteenth century. Harris was also a member of the Republican Party and active in state politics. He served in the Indiana Senate from 1876 to 1880, but was unsuccessful in his bid for the U.S. House of Representatives in 1889. Harris used his political connections with Charles W. Fairbanks, who was serving as U.S. Senator from Indiana at that time, to secure an appointment in 1899 as U.S. Envoy Extraordinary and Minister Plenipotentiary (ambassador) to Austria-Hungary. Harris resigned his diplomatic post and was recalled to the United States in 1901. He resumed his law career in Indianapolis and in his later years served as president of the Indiana State Bar Association and as a member of Purdue University's board of trustees, among other civic activities.

=== Lawyer ===
Harris spent a year teaching before establishing a law practice in Indianapolis, Indiana. He was admitted to the bar in 1865, the same year he formed a law partnership with John T. Dye. On November 30, 1878, a gathering of forty local attorneys that included the future U.S. President Benjamin Harrison and future U.S. Vice President Charles W. Fairbanks met in the law offices of Dye and Harris to establish the Indianapolis Bar Association. Harris served as president of the association in 1883 and in 1890. Harris and Dye maintained their law practice for fourteen years, but dissolved the partnership in 1879, when Dye went to work for the Big Four Railroad. Afterwards, Harris practiced law alone, mainly focusing on constitutional law and corporate law, his specialty.

Harris became one of the state's most prominent lawyers in the late nineteenth century and first decade of the twentieth century. He supported the concept of workers' compensation and favored the use of arbitration boards to settle labor disputes. Harris also authored Modern Views of Compensation for Personal Injuries (Indianapolis, 1909). In addition, he delivered lectures at Purdue University regarding railroads and railroad management that were later published.

=== Indiana politician ===
Harris, a member of the Republican Party, was elected to Indiana Senate representing Marion County, Indiana, in 1876. He served in two sessions of the Indiana General Assembly (1877 and 1879) before his term ended in 1880. Harris favored progressive legislation. He became a member of the Senate's judicial committee and a leader of the Republicans on the Senate floor at a time when the state had a Democratic majority. While Harris was serving in his first session of the state senate in 1877, his father, Branson Harris, was serving in the Indiana House of Representatives.

In 1889 Harris was an unsuccessful Republican candidate for the U.S. House of Representatives. He served as a presidential elector for Indiana in 1896.

=== Diplomat ===
Harris used his connections in the state's Republican Party and his friendship with Charles Fairbanks, a U.S. senator from Indiana at that time, to secure an appointment on January 10, 1899, from President William McKinley to serve as U.S. Envoy Extraordinary and Minister Plenipotentiary to Austria-Hungary. Harris replaced Charlemagne Tower Jr., who was appointed U.S. ambassador to Russia. Harris served in Vienna, Austria, until he resigned and was recalled to the United States in 1901. Harris and his wife returned to Indianapolis, where he resumed a private law practice.

== Community service ==
Harris was active in civic affairs, especially in the areas of law and higher education. He helped found the Indiana Law School (1893), in addition to serving on its board of directors, as an early instructor, and as the school's president (1899 to 1904). The private law school was a forerunner to the Indiana University Robert H. McKinney School of Law in Indianapolis. In addition his leadership at the law school, Harris was president of the Indiana State Bar Association (1904), and served on the University of Indianapolis's board of trustees (1899 to 1904). He joined Purdue University's board of trustees on March 29, 1905, and served as its president from 1909 until his death in 1916. Harris was also a member of the Indiana Historical Society and the Columbia Club in Indianapolis.

== Death and legacy ==
Harris suffered a stroke and died in Indianapolis on September 2, 1916. He is buried at Crown Hill Cemetery in Indianapolis, Marion County, Indiana.

Harris's legacy includes his contributions to the state's legal profession, most notably the formation of the Indianapolis Bar Association, which has grown from its original 40 members to a more than 5,100, and the Indiana State Bar Association, which also continues to serve the state's legal community.

To save it from demolition the Town (present-day City) of Fishers, Indiana, supervised the move of Harris's summer home in Hamilton County from its original location at 96th Street and Allisonville Road to 106th Street and Eller Road (present-day Heritage Park at White River) in 1996. The West-Harris House (also known as Ambassador House) was listed on the National Register of Historic Places in 1999. The restored home is operated as a local history museum and a site for community events and private rentals.

== Honors and tributes ==
At India Crago Harris's bequest, a trust in honor of her husband was established in 1948 to fund a public lecture series. The Addison C. Harris Memorial Lecture brings prominent legal scholars to Indiana to lecture at Indiana University Bloomington's Maurer School of Law. The first lectures in the series were delivered in 1949. More recently, Professor Jack Balkin, Yale Law School, delivered, "The Recent Unpleasantness: Understanding the Cycles of Constitutional Time," on September 13, 2017.
