= Kathryn Walt Hall =

American diplomat (born 1947)

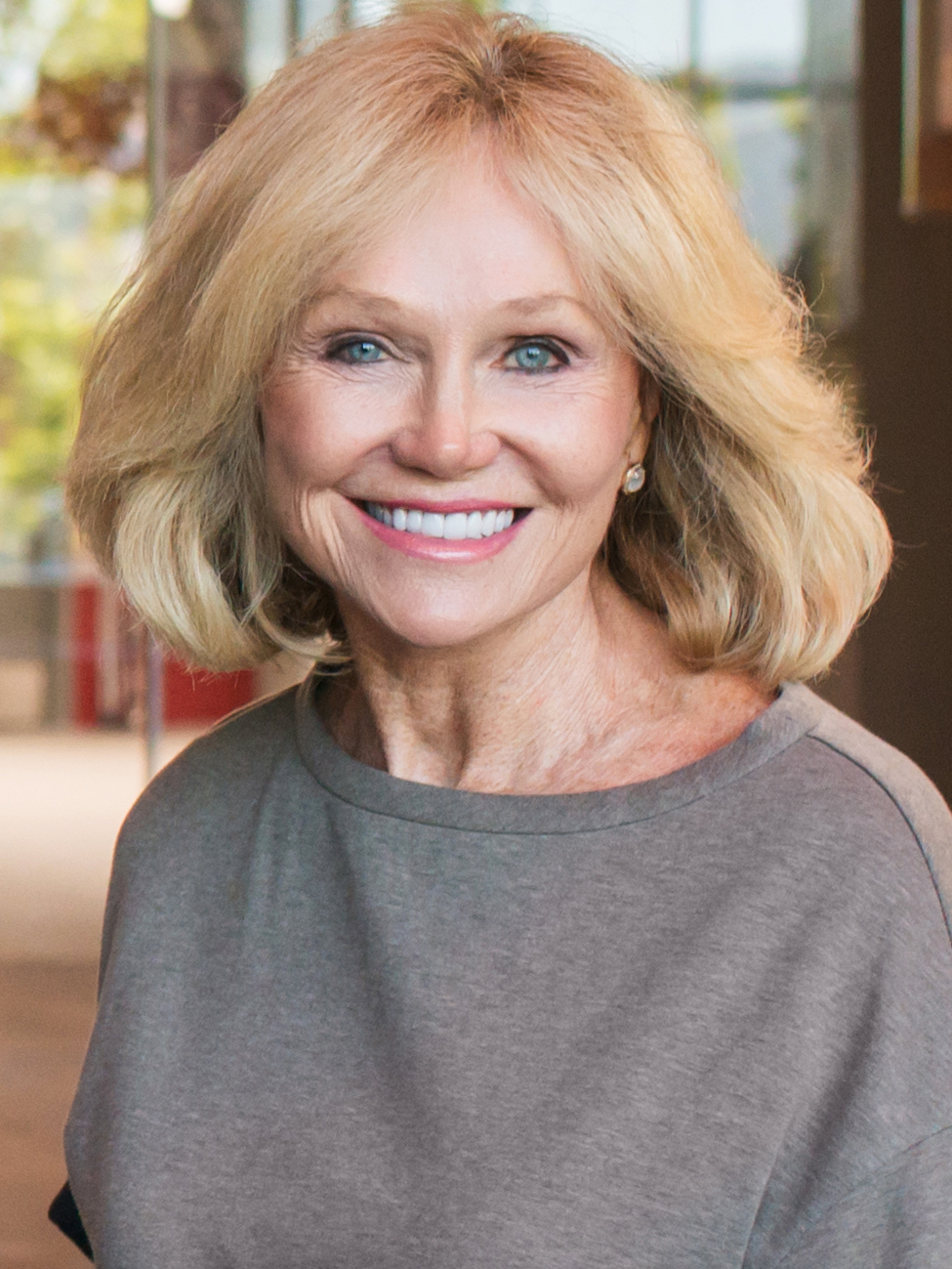

United States Ambassador to Austria
- In office December 11, 1997 – July 10, 2001
- President: Bill Clinton; George W. Bush
- Preceded by: Swanee Hunt
- Succeeded by: Lyons Brown Jr.

Personal details
- Born: 1947 (age 78–79) Louisville, Kentucky, U.S.
- Spouse: Craig Hall (m. 1993)
- Education: University of California, Berkeley (AB); University of California, Hastings College of Law (JD); University of California, Berkeley–Columbia University (MBA)

Kathryn Walt Hall (born 1947) is an American attorney, businesswoman and former diplomat who served as the U.S. Ambassador to Austria from 1997 to 2001.

Hall was born in 1947. She earned an A.B. in Economics from the University of California, Berkeley, and a J.D. from the University of California, Hastings College of Law. She also has a joint MBA from UC California, Berkeley, and Columbia University. Hall began her public career as an Assistant City Attorney in Berkeley, California. She went on to work in the private sector including at Safeway Inc. and was the President of Kathryn Hall Vineyards, Inc., and of Walt Management, Inc., an inner-city housing and development company. Before becoming Ambassador, Hall was Managing Director and Partner of the investment firm Hall Financial Group, Inc. She returned to winemaking in 2001.
