= Craig McCaw =

American businessman

- Born: August 11, 1949 (age 77); Centralia, Washington, U.S.
- Education: Stanford University
- Occupations: Businessman and entrepreneur
- Known for: Wireless service companies
- Spouses: Wendy Petrak (m. 1974; div. 1997) Susan Rasinski (m. 1998; div. 2019)
- Children: 3
- Father: J. Elroy McCaw
- Relatives: Bruce McCaw and John McCaw Jr. (brothers)

Craig McCaw (born August 11, 1949) is an American businessman and entrepreneur, known for being a pioneer in the cellular phone industry. He is the founder of McCaw Cellular (now part of AT&T Mobility) and Clearwire Corporation (now part of T-Mobile via the Sprint acquisition).

== Early life and cable TV beginnings ==
McCaw is the second of four sons of Marion and J. Elroy McCaw. As a child, the family lived in the posh gated Highlands community north of Seattle, and McCaw attended Seattle's private Lakeside School, where he was later given a Lakeside Distinguished Alumni Award. McCaw's father was a broadcasting magnate and owner of Gotham Broadcasting Corporation. Gotham owned the New York City radio station WINS, which became one of the first stations to play rock and roll, with Alan Freed being one of the earliest famous disc jockeys on the station. McCaw's father was in the business of buying and selling TV and radio stations, which brought in wealth but also incurred significant debts. Elroy entered the cable television business in the 1960s, and his four sons worked as linemen and door-to-door salesmen.

When Elroy McCaw died in 1969 at age 57, the only company not sold to repay the debt was the small cable company in Centralia, Washington, with an estimated 2,000 to 4,000 subscribers, that was in trust. While at Stanford, Craig joined Delta Kappa Epsilon fraternity (DKE), and in his senior year, he took the helm of the cable company and set out to rebuild his family name. He used the cash flows from his growing cable company to purchase other remote cable companies, resulting in a profitable conglomerate. By the 1980s, McCaw Cablevision was the 20th largest cable carrier in the US.

== Cellular telephone industry ==
When the FCC held a lottery for cellular licenses in the early 1980s, many ordinary Americans became wealthy by winning the right to establish cellular systems in cities across America. In addition to entering the lottery himself, McCaw approached many other lottery winners and bought their cellular rights, which were already considered to be undervalued. Using the same tactic he'd used in cable TV, McCaw financed an aggressive cellular expansion by borrowing against and selling shares in the cable operation.

After acquiring MCI's cellular wing in 1986, the McCaw brothers sold the cable company to Cooke Cablevision (now part of Comcast). The combined cellular operation was a significant player in the field. In 1990, McCaw was the highest paid CEO in the US.

In 1994, the McCaw brothers sold McCaw Cellular to AT&T Corporation for $11.5 billion. The company was renamed AT&T Wireless. AT&T Wireless was sold to Cingular in 2004 to become the nation's largest Wireless carrier.

Following the sale of McCaw Cellular, McCaw took interest in Nextel, a then-floundering wireless carrier. By April 1995 McCaw gained effective control of the company contributing, along with his brothers, $1.1 billion over time. Within four years Nextel grew significantly to become a challenging wireless competitor, servicing 3.6 million customers throughout the U.S. and ten of the largest international markets. In 1999 McCaw formed Nextel Partners, Inc. which was later acquired by Sprint Nextel, Inc., for $6.5 billion in 2006, following a $36 billion merger between Nextel and the Sprint Corporation in 2005.

== Later ventures ==
Later that same year, McCaw founded NEXTLINK Communications, planning to enter the broadband and internet service provider market. In 2000, the company merged with Concentric Network and was renamed XO Communications. The company filed for bankruptcy protection in 2002.

In 1994, McCaw and Bill Gates teamed up to form Teledesic, with an ambitious plan to form a broadband satellite communications system with hundreds of low Earth orbit satellites. In 2002, Teledesic halted satellite production; and in 2003, it sold its spectrum licenses.

In 2000, McCaw invested in New ICO, a refloating after bankruptcy of ICO Global Communications, a mobile-satellite service (MSS) constellation company. The company did not complete its planned satellite constellation.

In August 2004, McCaw founded Clearwire Corporation, a provider of wireless broadband Internet service. The company's U.S. broadband network is deployed in markets ranging from major metropolitan areas to small, rural communities.

At the end of 2007, Clearwire offered service in 46 markets in the U.S. as well as four markets in Europe.

McCaw, who served as Chairman of Clearwire until December 31, 2010, once said to an interviewer, "Filling a need that others aren't addressing has always been a focus of the companies that I have been involved with."

In November 2008, Clearwire completed a landmark transaction with Sprint combining their next-generation wireless broadband businesses into a new wireless communications company, which retained the name Clearwire. With the closing, Sprint contributed all of its 2.5 GHz spectrum and its WiMAX-related assets, including its XOHM business, to Clearwire. In addition, Clearwire received a $3.2 billion cash investment from Comcast, Intel, Time Warner Cable, Google and Bright House Networks.

The new company traded on the NASDAQ as CLWR. As part of the announcement, then Clearwire Chairman Craig McCaw said, "The power of the mobile Internet, which offers speed and mobility, home and away, on any device or screen, will fundamentally transform the communications landscape in our country. We believe that the new Clearwire will operate one of the fastest and most capable broadband wireless networks ever conceived, giving us the opportunity to return the U.S. to a leadership position in the global wireless industry."

In January 2009, Clearwire launched its first 4G mobile WiMAX network in Portland, Oregon, making it only the second city after Baltimore to offer a high-speed network at true broadband speeds. By the end of 2010, the company had expanded its 4G network to 71 markets in the U.S. covering more than 110 million people.

== Political activities ==
McCaw is a major Republican donor, and has been described as a 'bundler' for the 2012 presidential candidate Mitt Romney. He has supported Jon Huntsman, John McCain, and George W. Bush. In 2012, McCaw donated $500,000 to American Crossroads.

== Personal life ==
McCaw was a founding donor and underwriter of the Free Willy Foundation (along with Warner Brothers Studios) from 1993 to 2002, with an original $2 million donation. The foundation was formed to release the orca Keiko, star of the 1993 film Free Willy, back into the wild. It was later known as the Free Willy-Keiko Foundation.

McCaw was previously married to Wendy McCaw, a California newspaper publisher. They divorced in 1997. McCaw was married to Susan Rasinski McCaw, an investment banker and former United States Ambassador to Austria. They have three children together, Chase McCaw, Julia McCaw, and Reid McCaw.

In 1999, McCaw bought a house in Hunts Point, Washington from Kenny G.

McCaw is currently on the Board of Overseers for the Hoover Institution and serves on the boards of The Nature Conservancy, the Horatio Alger Association of Distinguished Americans, and the Friends of Nelson Mandela Foundation. He is president of the Craig and Susan McCaw Foundation, which supports a variety of educational, environmental, and international economic development projects. McCaw has also served on the boards of Conservation International, the Grameen Technology Center, the National Security Telecommunications Advisory Committee, and the Academy of Achievement.

McCaw is a significant car collector, and once amassed a collection of 400 cars with his brother, Bruce. In 2012 McCaw paid $35 million for a 1962 Ferrari 250 GTO, setting a new record for the most expensive car ever sold. The 250 GTO was originally built for Stirling Moss, who never raced the car. It was driven at the 1962 24 Hours of Le Mans by Innes Ireland and Masten Gregory.

As of 2016, Craig McCaw is no longer on the Forbes 400 List of Wealthiest Americans.

== Awards and honors ==
- 1989 – Golden Plate Award of the American Academy of Achievement
- 2000 – Wireless Hall of Fame Honoree
- 2007 – Silicon Valley Forum's Visionary Honoree

== See also ==
- John McCaw Jr.
