= Wendy McCaw =

American businesswoman

Wendy P. McCaw
- Born: Wendy Petrak; Palo Alto, California, United States
- Occupation: Newspaper publisher
- Spouse: Craig McCaw (m. 1974; div. 1997)

Wendy McCaw (née Petrak) is a businesswoman and former owner of the Santa Barbara News-Press, a newspaper that filed for bankruptcy on July 21, 2023.

== Early life and career ==
She was born Wendy Petrak in Palo Alto, California, in 1951. She attended Stanford University, where she majored in history and met Craig McCaw during their sophomore year. They married in 1974, a year after graduation. During their marriage, they grew McCaw Communications into McCaw Cellular, eventually selling to AT&T in 1994.

== Santa Barbara News-Press ==
In 2000, McCaw purchased the Santa Barbara News-Press, one of California's oldest newspapers, from The New York Times for $100 million.

In 2006, McCaw was accused of interfering with the newsroom editorial judgment at the News-Press. Five editors and a columnist resigned over the controversy. A number of other publishers and editors have resigned over differences with McCaw since she purchased the paper in 2000.

In December 2006, McCaw sued Chapman University professor Susan Paterno over her article in the American Journalism Review that had criticized her management of the paper.

By 2016, staff at the newspaper had dropped from 200, from when she purchased the newspaper, to 20.

On October 7, 2016, the Santa Barbara News-Press was the first newspaper in the United States to endorse Donald Trump for president during the 2016 elections. It was one of only six newspapers in the country to do so, and alienated much of the left-leaning area. (Note: Only four newspapers endorsed Donald Trump during the 2016 Republican primary for President of the United States: Santa Barbara News-Press, the Jared Kushner-owned New York Observer, the New York Post, and the longtime supporter of Donald Trump the National Enquirer. The six newspapers in the United States that endorsed Donald Trump during the 2016 United States elections for President are the Santa Barbara News-Press on October 7, 2016, St. Joseph News-Press of St. Joseph, Missouri, on October 20, 2016, Waxahachie Daily Light from a Dallas suburb, the Times-Gazette of Hillsboro, Ohio, Sheldon Adelson's Las Vegas Review-Journal, and the Antelope Valley Press from Palmdale, California, on October 23, 2016.) According to biographer Sam Tyler, there was no question McCaw was "behind the endorsement.

In April 2017, a federal judge ordered McCaw to offer reinstatement and around $2 million in back pay to former columnist Richard Mineards.

In July 2018, after several administrative and court decisions against McCaw and the News-Press, the National Labor Relations Board announced it would seek $2.2 million on behalf of dozens of newsroom employees who were mistreated by McCaw. McCaw would be ordered to pay $936,000 to “make employees whole” for illegally hiring nonunion temporary workers, $705,000 in back pay for two employees whom she illegally laid off or fired, and $222,000 for employees whose merit pay she illegally suspended.

On Friday, July 21, 2023, the News-Press filed for bankruptcy. An email was sent by managing editor Dave Mason telling the staff: “I have some bad news. Wendy filed for bankruptcy on Friday. All of our jobs are eliminated, and the News-Press has stopped publishing. They ran out of money to pay us. They will issue final paychecks to us when the bankruptcy is approved in court."

== Personal ==
McCaw has called herself a defender of animal rights. McCaw and her ex-husband Craig McCaw said they gave $3.1 million in donations in the 1990s to help return Keiko, the orca star of "Free Willy," to the wild. Keiko died shortly after.

== Film ==
Citizen McCaw is a 2008 documentary by Sam Tyler that presents both the relationships with McCaw and her former editor, Jerry Roberts, and five other employees since July 2006 when they quit her staff at Santa Barbara News-Press and the direction the newspaper and her ethics has taken the newspaper since her ownership began. On March 7, 2008, it premiered in Santa Barbara's Arlington Theatre, was released on DVD, and has been shown at UC Berkeley's Graduate School of Journalism and other journalism schools as well.
