= Susan McCaw =

American businesswoman, former diplomat and philanthropist

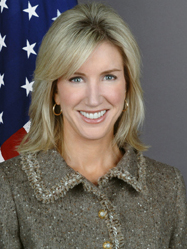

United States Ambassador to Austria
- In office November 30, 2005 – November 25, 2007
- President: George W. Bush
- Preceded by: Lyons Brown Jr.
- Succeeded by: David F. Girard-diCarlo

Personal details
- Born: Susan Rasinski; 1962 (age 63–64) Orange County, California, United States
- Party: Republican
- Spouse: Craig McCaw (m. 1998; div. 2019)
- Children: 3
- Education: Stanford University; Harvard Business School

Susan Rasinski McCaw (born 1962) is an American businesswoman, former diplomat and philanthropist. She was a major fundraiser for the George W. Bush 2004 presidential campaign, and was appointed by the Bush administration as U.S. Ambassador to the Republic of Austria (2005–2007). She is currently President of SRM Capital Investments, a private investment firm. Previously, she worked at Robertson Stephens & Co., as President of COM Investments and as its Principal.

== Early life and education ==
McCaw was born in 1962 in Orange County, California, where she was also raised. She earned a BA in Economics from Stanford University, and an MBA from Harvard Business School.

== Political career ==
McCaw was a major fundraiser in 2004 for the Bush administration, as well as other Republican Party campaigns. She was Finance Co-Chair for Bush-Cheney '04 in Washington State and was a member of the national steering committee for W Stands for Women. She was on the Women's Coalition Advisory Board of the Republican National Committee. In 2008, McCaw served as Honorary Washington State Chair for the McCain-Palin Campaign.

McCaw was sworn in as Ambassador to Austria on November 30, 2005. United States Secretary of State Condoleezza Rice presided over the ceremony. McCaw officially assumed her post as Ambassador after presenting her diplomatic credentials to Austrian President Heinz Fischer on January 9, 2006. She announced her resignation on July 3, 2007 and left Austria on November 25, 2007.

== Business career ==
McCaw serves on several boards including Lions Gate Entertainment Corp. (NASDAQ: LION), Air Lease Corporation (NYSE: AL), and The Ronald Reagan Presidential Foundation. She is also the Chair of the Hoover Institution. In addition, McCaw is a founding board member and board chair of the Malala Fund, a nonprofit founded by Malala Yousafzai that fights for girls' education. McCaw also serves on the Khan Academy Global Advisory Board, the Knight-Hennessy Scholars Global Advisory Board and Harvard Business School’s Board of Dean’s Advisors. McCaw is a member of the Council on Foreign Relations and the Council of American Ambassadors. She is Trustee Emerita of Stanford University where she chaired the Development and Globalization committees.

== Personal life ==
McCaw was married to Craig McCaw from 1998 to 2019. She has three children and resides in North Palm Beach, Florida.

Diplomatic posts
Preceded by W.L. Lyons Brown	U.S. Ambassador to Austria; 2006–2007	Succeeded by David F. Girard-diCarlo
