= List of ambassadors of the United States to Austria =

Ambassador of the United States to Austria
- Botschafter der Vereinigten Staaten in Österreich
- Seal of the United States Department of State

- Flag of a United States ambassador

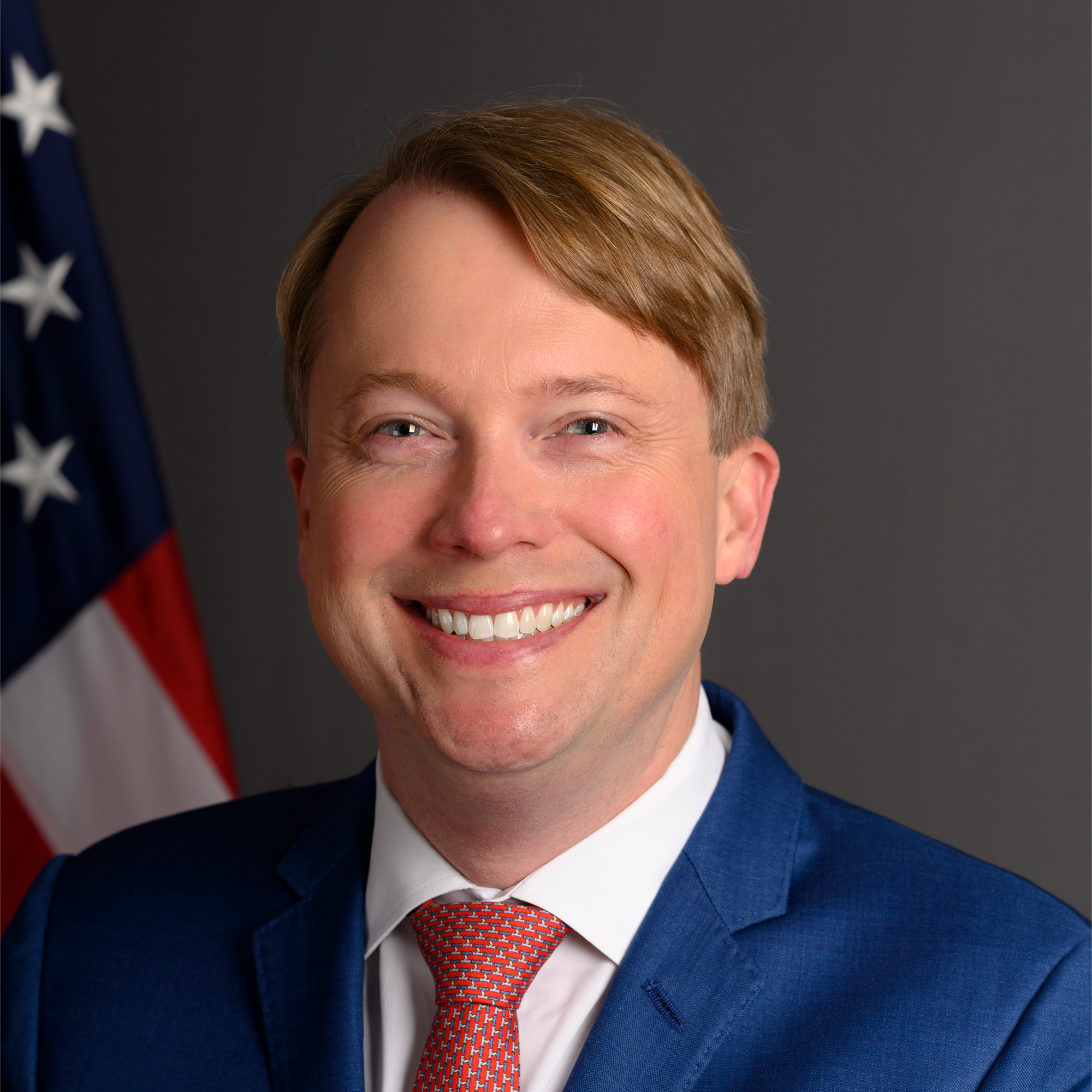
- Incumbent; Arthur Fisher since November 19, 2025
- Inaugural holder: Henry A. P. Muhlenberg as Envoy Extraordinary and Minister Plenipotentiary
- Formation: February 8, 1838
- Website: Ambassador to Austria

The first ambassadors of the United States were accredited to the Austrian Empire after The United States first established diplomatic relations with Austria in 1838. Relations between the United States have been continuous since that time except for two interruptions during World War I and World War II.

In 1867 the Austrian Empire became Austria-Hungary and the ambassadors were so commissioned. After the resumption of diplomatic relations following World War I, the ambassadors were commissioned to Austria.

The United States Embassy in Austria is in Vienna.

== Ambassadors ==
#	Image	Name	Title	Appointed	Presented credentials	Terminated mission	Notes
1		Henry A. P. Muhlenberg	Envoy Extraordinary and Minister Plenipotentiary	February 8, 1838	November 7, 1838	Left post, September 18, 1840	
2		Daniel Jenifer	Envoy Extraordinary and Minister Plenipotentiary	August 27, 1841	March 30, 1842	Presented recall, June 28–July 7, 1845	From 1845 until 1854 there was no U.S. minister present. The U.S. was represented by a succession of chargés d’affaires.
-		William H. Stiles	Chargé d'affaires	April 19, 1845	August 5, 1845	Left post, August 1, 1849	
-		James Watson Webb	Chargé d'affaires	November 1, 1849	February 6, 1850	Left post, May 8, 1850	
-		Charles J. McCurdy	Chargé d'affaires	September 27, 1850	March 14, 1851	October 12, 1852	
-		Thomas M. Foote	Chargé d'affaires	September 16, 1852	December 14, 1852	Presented recall, June 25, 1853	
-		Henry R. Jackson	Chargé d'affaires	May 24, 1853	September 16, 1853	Promoted to Minister Resident	
3		Henry R. Jackson	Minister Resident	June 29, 1854	September 28, 1854	on or after June 1, 1858	
4		J. Glancy Jones	Envoy Extraordinary and Minister Plenipotentiary	December 15, 1858	February 14, 1859	Presented recall, November 14, 1861	
5		J. Lothrop Motley	Envoy Extraordinary and Minister Plenipotentiary	August 10, 1861	November 14, 1861	June 14, 1867	President Andrew Johnson nominated eight men to be ambassador to Austria, but the Senate rejected or declined to consider them, most likely because of the President's disputes with the Congress over other issues.
6		Henry M. Watts	Envoy Extraordinary and Minister Plenipotentiary	July 25, 1868	September 25, 1868	Presented recall, June 1, 1869	
7		John Jay II	Envoy Extraordinary and Minister Plenipotentiary	1869	June 1, 1869	Presented recall, March 31, 1875	Ambassadors after 1869 were commissioned to Austria-Hungary.
8		Godlove S. Orth	Envoy Extraordinary and Minister Plenipotentiary	March 9, 1875	May 24, 1875	Relinquished charge, March 10, 1876	
9		Edward F. Beale	Envoy Extraordinary and Minister Plenipotentiary	June 1, 1876	August 10, 1876	Left post, April 20, 1877	
10		John A. Kasson	Envoy Extraordinary and Minister Plenipotentiary	11, 1877	August 30, 1877	Presented recall, March 25, 1881	
11		William Walter Phelps	Envoy Extraordinary and Minister Plenipotentiary	May 5, 1881	June 20, 1881	Superseded June 30, 1882	
12		Alphonso Taft	Envoy Extraordinary and Minister Plenipotentiary	April 26, 1882	June 30, 1882	Left post, August 25, 1884	
13		John M. Francis	Envoy Extraordinary and Minister Plenipotentiary	July 4, 1884	September 11, 1884	Presented recall, August 3, 1885	
14		Alexander R. Lawton	Envoy Extraordinary and Minister Plenipotentiary	April 15, 1887	August 25, 1887	May 15, 1889	
15		Frederick D. Grant	Envoy Extraordinary and Minister Plenipotentiary	March 23, 1889	May 15, 1889	Presented recall, June 8, 1893	
16		Bartlett Tripp	Envoy Extraordinary and Minister Plenipotentiary	April 6, 1893	June 8, 1893	Presented recall, June 18, 1897	
17		Charlemagne Tower	Envoy Extraordinary and Minister Plenipotentiary	April 1, 1897	June 18, 1897	Had farewell audience, February 9, 1899	
18		Addison C. Harris	Envoy Extraordinary and Minister Plenipotentiary	January 12, 1899	April 13, 1899	Presented recall, April 29, 1901	
19		Robert S. McCormick	Envoy Extraordinary and Minister Plenipotentiary	March 7, 1901	April 29, 1901	Promoted to Ambassador Extraordinary and Plenipotentiary	From 1902 to 1917 ambassadors to Austria bore the rank of Ambassador Extraordinary and Plenipotentiary.
19		Robert S. McCormick	Ambassador Extraordinary and Plenipotentiary	May 27, 1902	June 26, 1902	Presented recall, December 29, 1902	
20		Bellamy Storer	Ambassador Extraordinary and Plenipotentiary	September 26, 1902	January 3, 1903	Left post, February 8, 1906	
21		Charles Spencer Francis	Ambassador Extraordinary and Plenipotentiary	March 22, 1906	May 29, 1906	Presented recall, April 1, 1910	
22		Richard C. Kerens	Ambassador Extraordinary and Plenipotentiary	December 21, 1909	April 12, 1910	Left post, June 28, 1913	
23		Frederic Courtland Penfield – Political appointee	Ambassador Extraordinary and Plenipotentiary	July 28, 1913	September 26, 1913	Left post, April 7, 1917	The United States declared war on Germany April 6, 1917. Ambassador Penfield departed Austria the following day, April 7. Austria-Hungary severed diplomatic relations with the United States on April 9. Joseph C. Grew was serving as Chargé d'affaires ad interim when Austria-Hungary severed relations. Although a date is not recorded, the embassy would have been closed almost immediately and all diplomatic personnel would have departed or been expelled. Normal diplomatic relations were resumed in 1921.
-		Arthur Hugh Frazier – Career FSO	Chargé d'affaires pro tem	Not commissioned	November 25, 1921	Left post, May 21, 1922	After resumption of diplomatic relations, the embassy was downgraded to a legation and the title of the chief of mission was downgraded to Envoy Extraordinary and Minister Plenipotentiary and remained as such until 1952.
24		Albert Henry Washburn – Political appointee	Envoy Extraordinary and Minister Plenipotentiary	February 10, 1922	June 19, 1922	Died at post, April 29, 1930	
25		Gilchrist Baker Stockton – Political appointee	Envoy Extraordinary and Minister Plenipotentiary	January 22, 1930	May 15, 1930	Left post, September 21, 1933	
26		George Howard Earle III – Political appointee	Envoy Extraordinary and Minister Plenipotentiary	July 24, 1933	September 27, 1933	Left post, March 25, 1934	
27		George S. Messersmith – Career FSO	Envoy Extraordinary and Minister Plenipotentiary	April 7, 1934	May 23, 1934	Left post, July 11, 1937	
28		Grenville T. Emmet – Political appointee	Envoy Extraordinary and Minister Plenipotentiary	July 13, 1937	September 14, 1937	Died at post, September 26, 1937	John C. Wiley was serving as Chargé d'affaires ad interim when Austria was annexed to Germany, March 13, 1938; he closed the legation in Vienna, April 30, 1938. Diplomatic relations with Austria were broken during World War II but resumed in 1946.
29		John G. Erhardt – Career FSO	Envoy Extraordinary and Minister Plenipotentiary	August 3, 1946	September 7, 1946	Left post, June 27, 1950	
30		Walter J. Donnelly – Career FSO	Ambassador Extraordinary and Plenipotentiary	September 20, 1950	October 25, 1950	Left post, July 19, 1952	In 1951 the legation in Vienna was upgraded to an embassy and the chief of mission gained the rank of Ambassador Extraordinary and Plenipotentiary.
31		Llewellyn E. Thompson, Jr. – Career FSO	Ambassador Extraordinary and Plenipotentiary	July 17, 1952	September 4, 1952	July 9, 1957	
32		H. Freeman Matthews – Career FSO	Ambassador Extraordinary and Plenipotentiary	August 5, 1957	September 4, 1957	Left post, May 25, 1962	
33		James Williams Riddleberger – Career FSO	Ambassador Extraordinary and Plenipotentiary	October 23, 1962	December 12, 1962	Left post, May 10, 1967	
34		Douglas MacArthur II – Career FSO	Ambassador Extraordinary and Plenipotentiary	April 5, 1967	May 24, 1967	Left post, September 16, 1969	
35		John P. Humes – Political appointee	Ambassador Extraordinary and Plenipotentiary	September 26, 1969	October 29, 1969	Left post, March 6, 1975	
36		Wiley T. Buchanan, Jr. – Political appointee	Ambassador Extraordinary and Plenipotentiary	March 25, 1975	April 2, 1975	Left post, March 31, 1977	
37		Milton A. Wolf – Political appointee	Ambassador Extraordinary and Plenipotentiary	June 23, 1977	September 5, 1977	Left post, March 2, 1980	
38		Philip M. Kaiser – Political appointee	Ambassador Extraordinary and Plenipotentiary	February 19, 1980	March 25, 1980	Left post, March 2, 1981	
39		Theodore E. Cummings – Political appointee	Ambassador Extraordinary and Plenipotentiary	June 20, 1981	September 2, 1981	Died March 30, 1982	
40		Helene A. von Damm – Political appointee	Ambassador Extraordinary and Plenipotentiary	May 10, 1983	June 22, 1983	January 15, 1986	
41		Ronald S. Lauder – Political appointee	Ambassador Extraordinary and Plenipotentiary	April 16, 1986	May 7, 1986	October 27, 1987	
42		Henry Anatole Grunwald – Political appointee	Ambassador Extraordinary and Plenipotentiary	December 23, 1987	January 20, 1988	January 1, 1990	
43		Roy M. Huffington – Political appointee	Ambassador Extraordinary and Plenipotentiary	August 6, 1990	September 11, 1990	March 1, 1993	
44		Swanee Grace Hunt – Political appointee	Ambassador Extraordinary and Plenipotentiary	November 4, 1993	December 16, 1993	October 18, 1997	
45		Kathryn Walt Hall – Political appointee	Ambassador Extraordinary and Plenipotentiary	November 19, 1997	December 11, 1997	July 10, 2001	
46		Lyons Brown, Jr. – Political appointee	Ambassador Extraordinary and Plenipotentiary	November 5, 2001	December 19, 2001	October 5, 2005	
47		Susan Rasinski McCaw – Political appointee	Ambassador Extraordinary and Plenipotentiary	November 2, 2005	January 9, 2006	November 25, 2007	
48		David F. Girard-diCarlo – Political appointee	Ambassador Extraordinary and Plenipotentiary	July 1, 2008	September 10, 2008	January 20, 2009	
49		William Eacho – Political appointee	Ambassador Extraordinary and Plenipotentiary	August 12, 2009	September 14, 2009	August 3, 2013	
50		Alexa L. Wesner – Political appointee	Ambassador Extraordinary and Plenipotentiary	September 6, 2013	October 22, 2013	January 20, 2017	
-		Eugene S. Young – Career FSO	Chargé d’affaires a.i.		January 20, 2017	May 24, 2018	
51		Trevor Traina – Political appointee	Ambassador Extraordinary and Plenipotentiary	March 28, 2018	May 24, 2018	January 20, 2021	
-		Robin Dunnigan – Career FSO	Chargé d’affaires a.i.		January 20, 2021	July 12, 2021	
-		Mario Mesquita – Career FSO	Chargé d’affaires a.i.		July 12, 2021	January 12, 2022	
52		Victoria Reggie Kennedy – Political appointee	Ambassador Extraordinary and Plenipotentiary	November 16, 2021	January 12, 2022	January 20, 2025	
-		Kami A. Witmer – Career FSO	Chargé d’affaires a.i.		January 20, 2025	November 11, 2025	
53		Arthur Fisher – Political appointee	Ambassador Extraordinary and Plenipotentiary	October 7, 2025	November 19, 2025	Incumbent	

== See also ==
- Austria – United States relations
- Austrian Ambassador to the United States
- Embassy of the United States, Vienna
- Foreign relations of Austria
