= Theodore E. Cummings =

Austrian-born American diplomat

Theodore E. Cummings (December 25, 1907 – March 30, 1982) was an Austrian-born American diplomat. A non-career appointee, he served as the American ambassador extraordinary and plenipotentiary to Austria until his death on March 30, 1982.

A longtime friend of Ronald Reagan, Cummings was considered a member of his Kitchen Cabinet. He had known Reagan for a long time before he became president. Cummings had served in Reagan's governor administration as commissioner of the California Commission on Judicial Qualification, California Hospital Commissioner and as a member of the Commission on Health Services Industry of the Cost of Living Council.

== Biography ==
Cummings was a native of Austria. He was a resident of Beverly Hills, California, at the time of his death from cancer at Cedars-Sinai Medical Center. He was Chairman of Cedars-Sinai from 1954 until his appointment as Ambassador. Prior to that, he opened the first Food Giant supermarket, in 1944, in Long Beach and then went on to build and develop a string of stores called Builders Emporiums. He sold his holdings in 1968 for $52.5 million to Vornado Inc., of Garfield, New Jersey. Cummings died in Los Angeles, California on March 30, 1982, at the age of 74.
