= Indiana State Bar Association =

- Type: Legal Society
- Headquarters: Indianapolis, Indiana
- Location: United States
- Members: 11,500 in 2012 (2,000 out of state)
- Website: http://www.inbar.org/

The Indiana State Bar Association (ISBA) is a voluntary bar association for the state of Indiana. Unlike some state bar associations, in which membership is mandatory, ISBA membership is not required of lawyers licensed to practice in Indiana. The ISBA is headquartered in Indianapolis, Indiana. It includes among its members lawyers, judges, paralegals, law librarians, law students, and court administrators. About 85% of the practicing lawyers in the state are members.

== History ==
The ISBA began on 23 June 1896 in the hall of the Indiana House of Representatives, with more than 100 lawyers present. Benjamin Harrison served as the Association's first president and remains the only two-term president in its history.

== About ==
As the largest legal organization in Indiana, the Indiana State Bar Association advocates on behalf of the profession.

ISBA is a voluntary bar—unlike many other states with mandatory bars—meaning licensed attorneys are not required to be members. As a result, the association does not oversee attorney Continuing Legal Education (CLE), discipline, or licensing. The Indiana Supreme Court oversees these responsibilities.

The ISBA is governed by members elected to its House of Delegates, board of governors, and executive committee. An executive director and staff execute administrative duties in accordance with ISBA's governance.

== Organization and activities ==
The ISBA is the largest legal organization in the state. With approximately 12,000 members, the ISBA continues to serve and advocate on behalf of its members, their clients, and the public as the independent voice of the legal profession. ISBA does not handle matters such as law licensing or complaints against lawyers; these are within the purview of the Indiana Court System.

Among the ISBA's publications are the Res Gestae and various newsletters by its sections. Res Gestae began in 1956 when ISBA President Tom Scanlon created a publications' committee to upgrade The Bulletin, a mimeographed newsletter, which, in fact, was a legal-size sheet of paper that was nothing more than a calendar. Volunteer lawyer-editors and a small bar staff went to work, and the newly named Res Gestae was published, for the first time, in November of that year.
