= List of Indiana University Maurer School of Law alumni =

Following is a list of notable alumni of the Indiana University Maurer School of Law.

== Academia ==
- Lauren Robel (1983), Val Nolan Professor of Law, provost and executive vice president at Indiana University
- George P. Smith II (1964), law professor, lecturer, scholar

== Business ==
- Scott Flanders (1982), CEO of Playboy Enterprises, Inc.
- Brad Gerstner (1996), founder of Altimeter Capital

== Entertainment ==
- Hoagy Carmichael (1926), composer
- Michael Uslan (1976), originator of Batman movie series

== Government ==
- Pamela Jones Harbour (1984), commissioner of the Federal Trade Commission
- Earl Kintner (1938), chair of the Federal Trade Commission in the Eisenhower era

== Judiciary ==
- Shirley Abrahamson (1956), chief justice of the Wisconsin Supreme Court
- Harold Achor (1931), justice of the Indiana Supreme Court
- Norman Arterburn (1923), justice of the Indiana Supreme Court
- Franklin Cleckley (1965), first African-American justice of the West Virginia Supreme Court
- Gonzalo P. Curiel (1979), judge of the U.S. District Court for the Southern District of California
- Roger O. DeBruler (1960), justice of the Indiana Supreme Court
- S. Hugh Dillin (1938), U.S. District Court judge
- Jesse E. Eschbach (1949), judge of the U.S. Court of Appeals for the Seventh Circuit
- Fred Gause (1900), justice of the Indiana Supreme Court
- Frank Gilkison (1901), justice of the Indiana Supreme Court
- Richard Givan (1951), justice of the Indiana Supreme Court
- Christopher Goff (1996), justice of the Indiana Supreme Court
- John S. Hastings (1924), judge of the U.S. Court of Appeals for the Seventh Circuit
- George Washington Henley (1914), justice of the Indiana Supreme Court
- Paul G. Jasper (1932), justice of the Indiana Supreme Court
- Michael S. Kanne (1968), judge of the U.S. Court of Appeals for the Seventh Circuit
- Frederick Landis, Jr. (1934), justice of the Indiana Supreme Court
- Rodolfo Lozano (1966), U.S. District Court judge
- Larry J. McKinney (1969), chief judge of the U.S. District Court
- Sherman Minton (1915), justice of the U.S. Supreme Court; U.S. senator
- James E. Noland (1948), U.S. District Court judge
- Dixon Prentice (1942), justice of the Indiana Supreme Court
- Doris Pryor (2003), circuit judge, U.S. Court of Appeals for the Seventh Circuit
- Frederick Rakestraw (1947), justice of the Indiana Supreme Court
- Flerida Ruth P. Romero (LLM 1955), justice of the Supreme Court of the Philippines
- Loretta H. Rush (1983), chief justice of the Indiana Supreme Court
- Curtis G. Shake (1910), justice of the Indiana Supreme Court
- Geoffrey G. Slaughter (1989), justice of the Indiana Supreme Court
- Juanita Kidd Stout, justice of the Supreme Court of Pennsylvania, first black woman to serve as a state supreme court justice
- Frank Sullivan, Jr. (1982), associate justice of the Indiana Supreme Court (retired)
- John D. Tinder (1975), judge of the U.S. Court of Appeals for the Seventh Circuit
- Walter Emanuel Treanor (1922), judge of the U.S. Court of Appeals for the Seventh Circuit and justice of the Indiana Supreme Court
- Joseph Van Bokkelen (1969), U.S. District Court judge and U.S. Attorney for the Northern District of Indiana

== Law ==
- Omer Stokes Jackson (1905), 28th Indiana Attorney General
- J. Emmett McManamon (1934), 33rd Indiana Attorney General
- Jean Stoffregen, lawyer who worked against racial injustice

== Politics ==
- Birch Bayh (1960), U.S. senator
- David L. Carden (1976), U.S. ambassador to ASEAN
- George N. Craig (1932), governor of Indiana
- Willis Gorman (1835), U.S. congressman
- Charles A. Halleck (1924), U.S. congressman
- Lee H. Hamilton (1956), U.S. congressman and chairman of the 9/11 Commission and the Iraq Study Group
- Vance Hartke (1948), U.S. senator
- Feisal al-Istrabadi (1988), Iraqi UN ambassador
- William E. Jenner (1930), U.S. senator
- Frank McCloskey (1971), U.S. congressman
- Arthur C. Mellette (1866), first governor of South Dakota and last territorial governor of the Dakota Territory
- Frank O'Bannon (1957), governor of Indiana
- Jeanette Reibman (1940), Pennsylvania state representative and state senator
- Shap Smith (1991), speaker of the Vermont House of Representatives
- Jamal Sowell, former Florida secretary of commerce; CEO of Enterprise Florida
- John V. Sullivan (1977), parliamentarian of the U.S. House of Representatives
- Richard B. Wathen (1942), Indiana state representative, journalist and author
- Wendell Willkie (1916), presidential candidate
