= Isadore Levine =

American judge (1897–1963)

- Born: March 25, 1897; Michigan City, Indiana
- Died: April 5, 1963 (aged 66)
- Education: University of Michigan Law School
- Parent(s): Morris and Dora Levine

Isadore Edward Levine (March 25, 1897 – April 5, 1963), born in Michigan City, Indiana, was a justice of the Indiana Supreme Court from January 13, 1955, to May 23, 1955.

Levine's parents were Morris and Dora Levine, Eastern European Jewish immigrants, who had begun a tailoring business in 1905, which eventually grew to a department store called the Levine Boston Store with locations in several cities.

Levine enrolled at the University of Michigan and, as an ROTC member, was commissioned to serve in the United States Army during World War I, but was never sent overseas as the war ended in an Armistice less than a week before his scheduled deployment date. He then received a B.A. from the University of Michigan in 1920, and an J.D. from the University of Michigan Law School in 1921. Levine entered the practice of law in La Porte, Indiana, and also maintained an active role in the American Legion, holding several offices in that organization including Third District Commander of the American Legion, commander of the Hamon Gray Post in LaPorte, and, from 1935 to 1943, member of the National Executive Committee.

In January 1955, Governor George N. Craig appointed Levine a seat on the Indiana Supreme Court vacated by the resignation of Floyd S. Draper. It was understood that Levine and fellow appointee George Henley would only serve for a few months, and then resign in favor of more permanent appointees. Nevertheless, Levine was the first Jewish justice on the Indiana Supreme Court. In 1958, Levine became president of the family department store business, continuing in that role, and in the practice of law, until his death.

Political offices
Preceded by Floyd Draper	Justice of the Indiana Supreme Court; 1955-1955	Succeeded by Frederick Landis Jr.
