= Theodore R. Boehm =

American judge (born 1938)

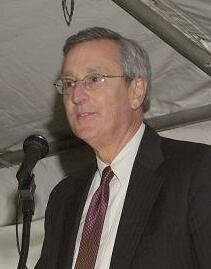
- Boehm in 2003

Associate Justice of the Supreme Court of Indiana
- In office August 8, 1996 – September 30, 2010
- Appointed by: Evan Bayh
- Preceded by: Roger O. DeBruler
- Succeeded by: Steven H. David

Personal details
- Born: September 12, 1938 (age 87) Evanston, Illinois
- Education: Brown University (BA); Harvard University (JD)
- Occupation: Lawyer

Theodore Reed Boehm (born September 12, 1938) served as a justice of the Indiana Supreme Court. Currently, he is a partner of Hoover Hull Turner LLP, an Indianapolis law firm.

Boehm attended public schools in Indianapolis, Indiana. He graduated from Brown University in 1960, summa cum laude, and from Harvard Law School in 1963, magna cum laude. While attending Brown he joined the Delta Upsilon fraternity and was a member of Phi Beta Kappa. At Harvard, he was an editor of the Harvard Law Review. After graduating, Boehm served as a law clerk to Chief Justice Earl Warren and retired Justices Stanley Reed and Harold Burton during the 1963 term of the United States Supreme Court. In 1964, he joined the Indianapolis law firm of Baker & Daniels, where he became a partner in 1970 and managing partner in 1980. He is a member of the American Law Institute. After serving as a general counsel for General Electric and Eli Lilly and Company from 1988 to 1995, he returned to Baker & Daniels before his appointment to the court.

Boehm was appointed to the Indiana Supreme Court by then-governor Evan Bayh on August 7, 1996. On November 4, 2008, the public voted to keep Boehm on the court in a statewide retention election. On May 25, 2010, Boehm announced that he would retire from the Court on September 30, 2010. He then served as a senior judge for the Court of Appeals of Indiana from October 1, 2010, to December 30, 2010. Thereafter, Boehm arbitrated and mediated complex business cases.

On March 16, 2015, Boehm announced that he would join the law firm of Hoover Hull Turner LLP as a partner. There, he continues his alternative dispute resolution practice and advises clients on a wide range of legal issues and appellate practice.

Boehm was chairman and CEO of the organizing committee for the 1987 Pan American Games in Indianapolis, and was the first president and CEO of Indiana Sports Corporation, which staged the 1982 U.S. Olympic Festival. He was also President of the Penrod Society and one of the principal organizers of the Economic Club of Indianapolis. He is a Trustee Emeritus of Brown University, a director of Metropolitan Indianapolis Public Broadcasting, Inc., Indiana Humanities, Inc., and The Economic Club of Indiana, Inc. He served on the nominating and governance committee of the United States Olympic Committee 2003–10 (chair 2003–07). He was co-chair of the organizing committee for the 2002 FIBA World Championship in Indianapolis and was chair of the Indianapolis Cultural Development Commission 2002–10.

== See also ==
- List of law clerks for the chief justice of the United States
- List of law clerks for the sixth seat of the Supreme Court of the United States
- List of law clerks for the eighth seat of the Supreme Court of the United States
