= Donald Mote =

American judge (1900–1968)

Donald R. Mote (April 27, 1900 – September 17, 1968) was a justice of the Indiana Supreme Court from January 3, 1967, to September 17, 1968.

== Education and career ==
Born in Randolph County, Indiana, Mote attended DePauw University and Wabash College, where he "played tackle on the varsity football team", and received an A.B. in 1923. He obtained his legal education from the George Washington University Law School, receiving an LL.B. in 1927. He practiced law in Indianapolis from 1927 to 1937, thereafter moving to North Manchester, Indiana in 1937, and to Wabash, Indiana, in 1958. He served on the Indiana Court of Appeals from 1962 to 1966, when he was elected as a Republican to a six-year term the state supreme court.

== Personal life ==
Mote married Flora Hunter, with whom he had a son and a daughter. Mote died at Wabash County Hospital "following a long illness attributed to cancer".

Political offices
Preceded by Frederick Rakestraw	Justice of the Indiana Supreme Court; 1967–1968	Succeeded by Roger O. DeBruler
