= Stoffregen =

Stoffregen is a surname. Notable people with the surname include:

- Elizabeth Stoffregen May (1907–2011), American economist, academic, and advocate
- Jean Stoffregen (1919–2008), American lawyer
- Kirsten Stoffregen Pedersen (1932–2017), Danish nun
