= George Henley =

George Henley may refer to:

- George Henley (judge) (1890–1965), justice of the Indiana Supreme Court
- D. L. George Henley (1917–1996), Canadian politician

== See also ==
- Georgie Henley (born 1995), English actress
