= Governor McCall =

Governor McCall may refer to:

- Samuel W. McCall (1851–1923), 47th Governor of Massachusetts
- Tom McCall (1913–1983), 30th Governor of Oregon
