= 1915 Massachusetts gubernatorial election =

- November 2, 1915
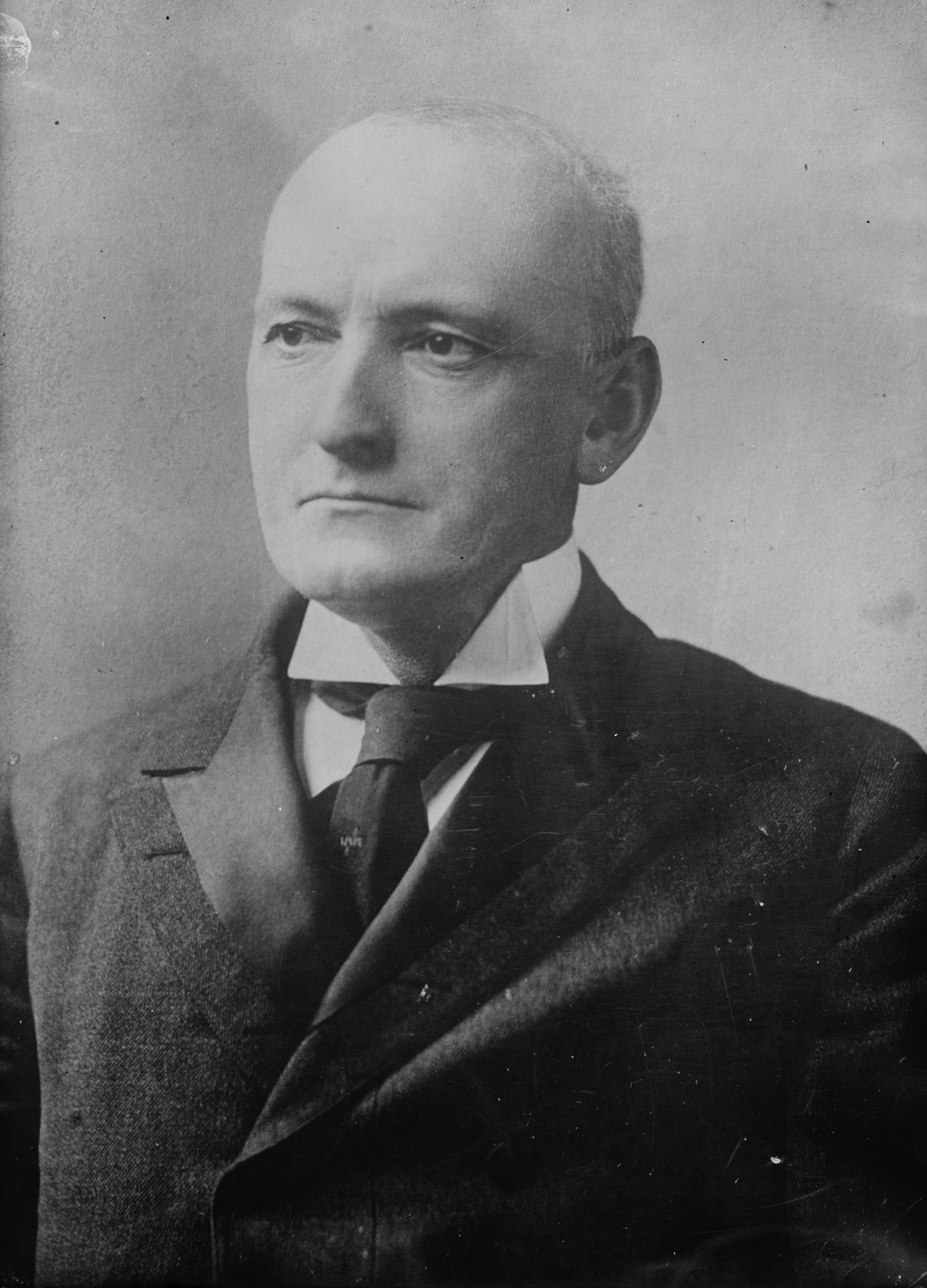

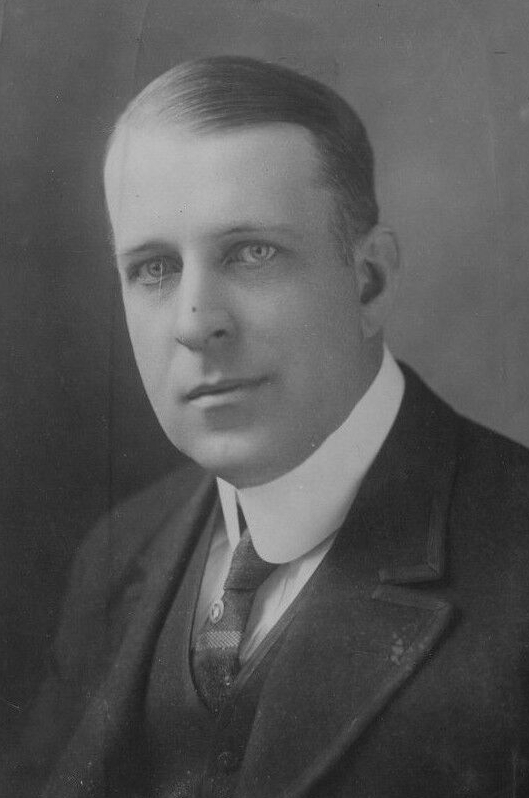
| Nominee | Samuel W. McCall | David I. Walsh |
| Party | Republican | Democratic |
| Popular vote | 235,863 | 229,550 |
| Percentage | 46.97% | 45.71% |
- McCall: 40-50% 50–60% 60–70% 70–80% 80–90% >90% Walsh: 40-50% 50–60% 60–70% 70–80% Tie: 50%
Governor before election
David I. Walsh
Democratic
Elected Governor
Samuel W. McCall
Republican

The 1915 Massachusetts gubernatorial election took place on November 2, 1915. The Republican nominee, Samuel W. McCall defeated the incumbent Democratic Governor David I. Walsh, with 46.97% of the vote.

Primary elections took place on September 21, 1915.

== Democratic primary ==
=== Governor ===
==== Candidates ====
- Frederick Simpson Deitrick, former U.S. representative from Cambridge
- David I. Walsh, incumbent governor

==== Results ====
1915 Democratic gubernatorial primary
| Party | Candidate | Votes | % |
|---|---|---|---|
| Democratic | David I. Walsh (incumbent) | 74,442 | 95.81% |
| Democratic | Frederick Simpson Deitrick | 3,255 | 4.19% |
| Total votes | | 77,697 | 100.00% |

=== Lieutenant governor ===
==== Candidates ====
- Edward P. Barry, former lieutenant governor

==== Results ====
1915 Democratic lieutenant gubernatorial primary
| Party | Candidate | Votes | % |
|---|---|---|---|
| Democratic | Edward P. Barry | 69,139 | 99.99% |
| Write-in | All others | 9 | 0.01% |
| Total votes | | 69,148 | 100.00% |

== Republican primary ==
=== Governor ===
==== Candidates ====
- Grafton D. Cushing, incumbent lieutenant governor
- Eugene Foss, former governor
- Samuel W. McCall, former U.S. representative from Winchester and nominee for governor in 1914

==== Results ====
1915 Republican gubernatorial primary
| Party | Candidate | Votes | % |
|---|---|---|---|
| Republican | Samuel W. McCall | 65,942 | 48.66% |
| Republican | Grafton D. Cushing | 59,799 | 44.13% |
| Republican | Eugene Foss | 9,775 | 7.21% |
| Write-in | All others | 5 | 0.00% |
| Total votes | | 135,521 | 100.00% |

=== Lieutenant governor ===
==== Candidates ====
- Calvin Coolidge, president of the Massachusetts Senate
- Guy Andrews Ham, former governor's councilor

==== Results ====
1915 Republican lieutenant gubernatorial primary
| Party | Candidate | Votes | % |
|---|---|---|---|
| Republican | Calvin Coolidge | 74,592 | 59.68% |
| Republican | Guy Andrews Ham | 50,401 | 40.32% |
| Write-in | All others | 4 | 0.00% |
| Total votes | | 124,997 | 100.00% |

== Progressive primary ==
=== Governor ===
==== Candidates ====
- Nelson B. Clark, of Beverly

==== Results ====
1915 Progressive gubernatorial primary
| Party | Candidate | Votes | % |
|---|---|---|---|
| Progressive | Nelson B. Clark | 1,298 | 99.39% |
| Write-in | All others | 8 | 0.61% |
| Total votes | | 1,306 | 100.00% |

== General election ==
=== Candidates ===
- Nelson B. Clark (Progressive)
- Walter S. Hutchins, former candidate for Massachusetts's 1st congressional district (Socialist)
- Samuel W. McCall, former U.S. representative from Winchester (Republican)
- Peter O'Rourke, candidate for lieutenant governor in 1913 (Socialist Labor)
- William Shaw (Prohibition)
- David I. Walsh, incumbent governor (Democratic)

=== Results ===
==== Governor ====
1915 Massachusetts gubernatorial election
| Party | Candidate | Votes | % | ±% |
|---|---|---|---|---|
| Republican | Samuel W. McCall | 235,863 | 46.97% | ▲3.62 |
| Democratic | David I. Walsh (incumbent) | 229,550 | 45.71% | ▼0.22 |
| Prohibition | William Shaw | 19,567 | 3.90% | ▲2.75 |
| Socialist | Walter S. Hutchins | 8,740 | 1.74% | ▼0.34 |
| Progressive | Nelson B. Clark | 6,969 | 1.39% | ▼5.63 |
| Socialist Labor | Peter O'Rourke | 1,456 | 0.29% | ▼0.19 |
| Write-in | All others | 1 | 0.00% | |
| Total votes | | 502,146 | 100.00% | |

==== Lieutenant governor ====
1915 Massachusetts lieutenant gubernatorial election
| Party | Candidate | Votes | % | ±% |
|---|---|---|---|---|
| Republican | Calvin Coolidge | 255,542 | 52.13% | ▲5.08 |
| Democratic | Edward P. Barry | 203,348 | 41.48% | ▼1.37 |
| Prohibition | Alfred H. Evans | 14,188 | 2.89% | ▲1.82 |
| Socialist | Samuel P. Levenberg | 9,034 | 1.84% | ▼0.43 |
| Progressive | Chester R. Lawrence | 4,905 | 1.00% | ▼5.25 |
| Socialist Labor | James Hayes | 3,194 | 0.65% | ▲0.13 |
| Write-in | All others | 2 | 0.00% | |
| Total votes | | 490,213 | 100.00% | |

== See also ==
- 1915 Massachusetts legislature

== Bibliography ==
- Office of the Secretary of the Commonwealth (1916). Election Statistics, 1915. Boston, MA.
