= Justice Draper =

Justice Draper may refer to:

- Floyd Draper (1893–1980), associate justice of the Supreme Court of Indiana
- George W. Draper III (born 1953), judge of the Supreme Court of Missouri
