= Steven David =

Steven David may refer to:

- Steven R. David, Professor of International Relations and Vice Dean for Undergraduate Education at Johns Hopkins University
- Steven H. David, formerly a Chief Defense Counsel at Guantanamo, currently a Justice of the Indiana Supreme Court
- Steve David, footballer
