= Frederick W. Dallinger =

American politician and jurist (1871-1955)

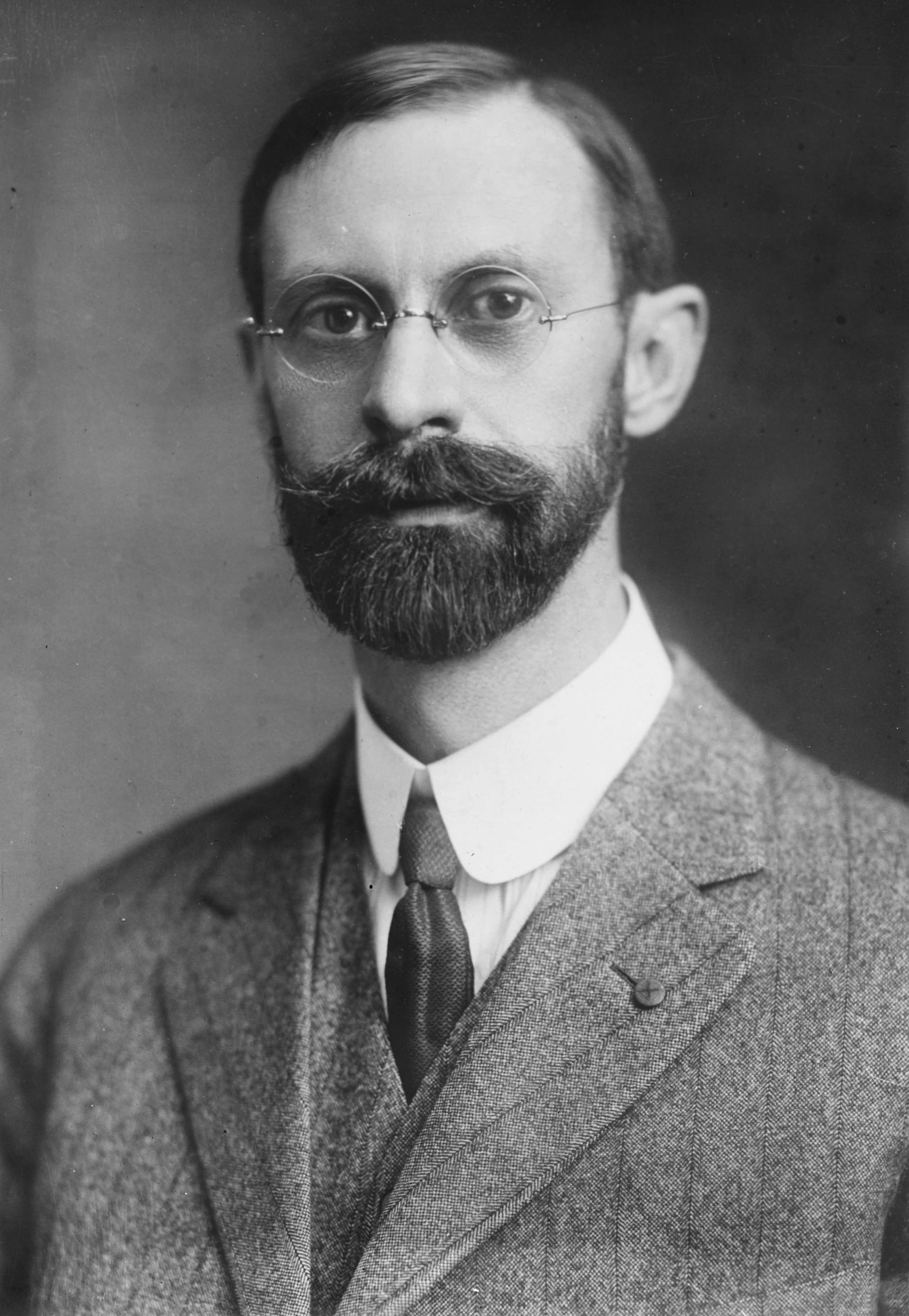
- Dallinger c. 1915

Judge of the United States Customs Court
- In office July 8, 1932 – October 31, 1942
- Appointed by: Herbert Hoover
- Preceded by: Israel F. Fischer
- Succeeded by: Charles Drummond Lawrence

Member of the U.S. House of Representatives from Massachusetts's 8th district
- In office March 4, 1915 – March 3, 1925
- Preceded by: Frederick Simpson Deitrick
- Succeeded by: Harry Irving Thayer
- In office November 2, 1926 – October 1, 1932
- Preceded by: Harry Irving Thayer
- Succeeded by: Arthur Daniel Healey

Member of the Massachusetts Senate
- In office January 1, 1896 – January 3, 1900

Personal details
- Born: Frederick William Dallinger; October 2, 1871 Cambridge, Massachusetts, U.S.
- Died: September 5, 1955 (aged 83) North Conway, New Hampshire, U.S.
- Resting place: Center Lovell Cemetery; Center Lovell, Maine
- Party: Republican
- Education: Harvard University (A.B., A.M.); Harvard Law School (LL.B.)

Frederick William Dallinger (October 2, 1871 – September 5, 1955) was a United States representative from Massachusetts and a judge of the United States Customs Court.

== Education and career ==
At Harvard, c. 1893

Born on October 2, 1871, in Cambridge, Middlesex County, Massachusetts, Dallinger attended the common schools and graduated from Cambridge Latin School in 1889. He received an Artium Baccalaureus degree in 1893 from Harvard University, an Artium Magister degree in 1894 from the same institution and a Bachelor of Laws in 1897 from Harvard Law School and was admitted to the bar the same year. He was a member of the Massachusetts House of Representatives from 1894 to 1895 and a member of the Massachusetts Senate from 1896 to 1899. He was in private practice in Boston, Massachusetts from 1897 to 1932. He was a public administrator for Middlesex County, Massachusetts from 1897 to 1932. He was President of the Cambridge Chamber of Commerce. He was a lecturer for Harvard Law School in 1912.

== Congressional service ==
Dallinger was elected as a Republican to the United States House of Representatives of the 64th United States Congress and to the four succeeding Congresses, serving from March 4, 1915 to March 3, 1925. He was Chairman of the Committee on Elections No. 1 in the 66th and 67th United States Congresses and the Committee on Education in the 68th United States Congress. He was not a candidate for renomination in 1924, but was an unsuccessful candidate for the Republican nomination for United States Senator. He was subsequently elected to the 69th United States Congress to fill the vacancy caused by the death of his successor, United States Representative Harry Irving Thayer. He was reelected to the 70th, 71st and 72nd United States Congresses and served from November 2, 1926, until his resignation effective October 1, 1932, having been appointed to the federal bench.

== Federal judicial service ==
Dallinger was nominated by President Herbert Hoover on June 20, 1932, to a seat on the United States Customs Court vacated by Judge Israel F. Fischer. He was confirmed by the United States Senate on June 28, 1932, and received his commission on July 8, 1932. His service terminated on October 31, 1942, due to his retirement. He was succeeded by Judge Charles Drummond Lawrence.

== Later years and death ==
After his retirement from the federal bench, Dallinger engaged in agricultural pursuits. He later retired and resided in Center Lovell, Maine. He died on September 5, 1955, in North Conway, New Hampshire. He was interred in Center Lovell Cemetery in Center Lovell.

== See also ==
- 119th Massachusetts General Court (1898)

== Sources ==
- "Frederick W. Dallinger". Biographical Directory of the United States Congress.

U.S. House of Representatives
Preceded by Frederick Simpson Deitrick	Member of the U.S. House of Representatives from Massachusetts's 8th congressional district 1915–1925	Succeeded by Harry Irving Thayer
Preceded by Harry Irving Thayer	Member of the U.S. House of Representatives from Massachusetts's 8th congressional district 1926–1932	Succeeded by Arthur Daniel Healey
Legal offices
Preceded by Israel F. Fischer	Judge of the United States Customs Court; 1932–1942	Succeeded by Charles Drummond Lawrence
