= Roger O. DeBruler =

American judge (1934–2017)

Justice of the Indiana Supreme Court
- In office September 30, 1968 – August 8, 1996
- Appointed by: Roger D. Branigin
- Preceded by: Donald Mote
- Succeeded by: Theodore R. Boehm

Roger Owen DeBruler (August 5, 1934 – February 13, 2017) was an American lawyer, politician, and judge who served as a justice of the Indiana Supreme Court from September 30, 1968, to August 8, 1996.

== Biography ==
DeBruler was born in Evansville, Indiana.

DeBruler attended public school in Evansville. He then attended Indiana University Bloomington, majoring in German and receiving his A.B. in 1958. He then joined the military before returning to Bloomington and attending the Indiana University Maurer School of Law, graduating in 1960 with his LL.B. and being admitted to the bar.

After graduating, DeBruler moved to Indianapolis and began practicing law. DeBruler served as Deputy City Prosecutor of Indianapolis from 1960 to 1963.

DeBruler, a Democrat, was appointed by Governor Matthew E. Welsh as judge of the Steuben County Circuit Court in 1963 and was re-elected to the same position in 1964.

DeBruler was appointed to the Indiana Supreme Court in 1958 by Governor Roger D. Branigin following the death of Justice Donald Mote. There was some controversy over whether DeBruler should stand for re-election to his position on the bench in 1968 or 1970 due to conflicting understandings of the provisions of the state constitution on the matter. In the end, he ended up standing for re-election in 1970 and won. He and Dixon Prentice were the last two Justices of the Indiana Supreme Court to be directly elected to the court—amendments to the state constitution made it so future justices would be appointed by the governor from a short list provided by the non-partisan Judicial Nominating Commission. During his long career on the court, he authored 886 majority opinions, 590 dissenting opinions, and about 270 concurring opinions.

A notable dissent came from DeBruler in the case of whether a man who quit his jobs for religious reasons was entitled to unemployment benefits. DeBruler's dissent was granted certiorari and adopted by the United States Supreme Court. The principles of DeBruler's dissent were later enshrined by the United States Congress into the 1993 Religious Freedom Restoration Act. DeBruler also opposed the death penalty, believing it to be in violation of the state constitution's Bill of Rights. Other important opinions by DeBruler led to greater protection from searches and seizures by the state government (specifically protection of government searches of automobiles) and greater protection for Hoosier juveniles from interrogation by the state government. DeBruler increasingly sided with the Republican Justices of the court following the appointment of Justices Randall Shepard and Brent Dickson in the mid-1980s. DeBruler's opinions had a large influence on Indiana jurisprudence.

DeBruler retired from the court in 1996, succeeded by Justice Theodore R. Boehm. DeBruler was the longest serving Justice of the court in the 20th Century and the third longest serving overall. After leaving the court, DeBruler spent a year in France and took classes at a local university while abroad.

DeBruler married Karen Steenerson of Steuben County. DeBruler once went on a trip to the Yukon with his sons, Roger Jr. and Joseph. DeBruler lived in Lockerbie Square, the oldest intact residential neighborhood in Indianapolis. He was also a patron of the Indianapolis Public Library and was a fan of the work of William Faulkner and James Joyce.

DeBruler died in 2017.

Political offices
Preceded by Donald Mote	Justice of the Indiana Supreme Court; 1968–1996	Succeeded by Theodore R. Boehm
