= Derek R. Molter =

American judge (born 1982)

Derek Molter
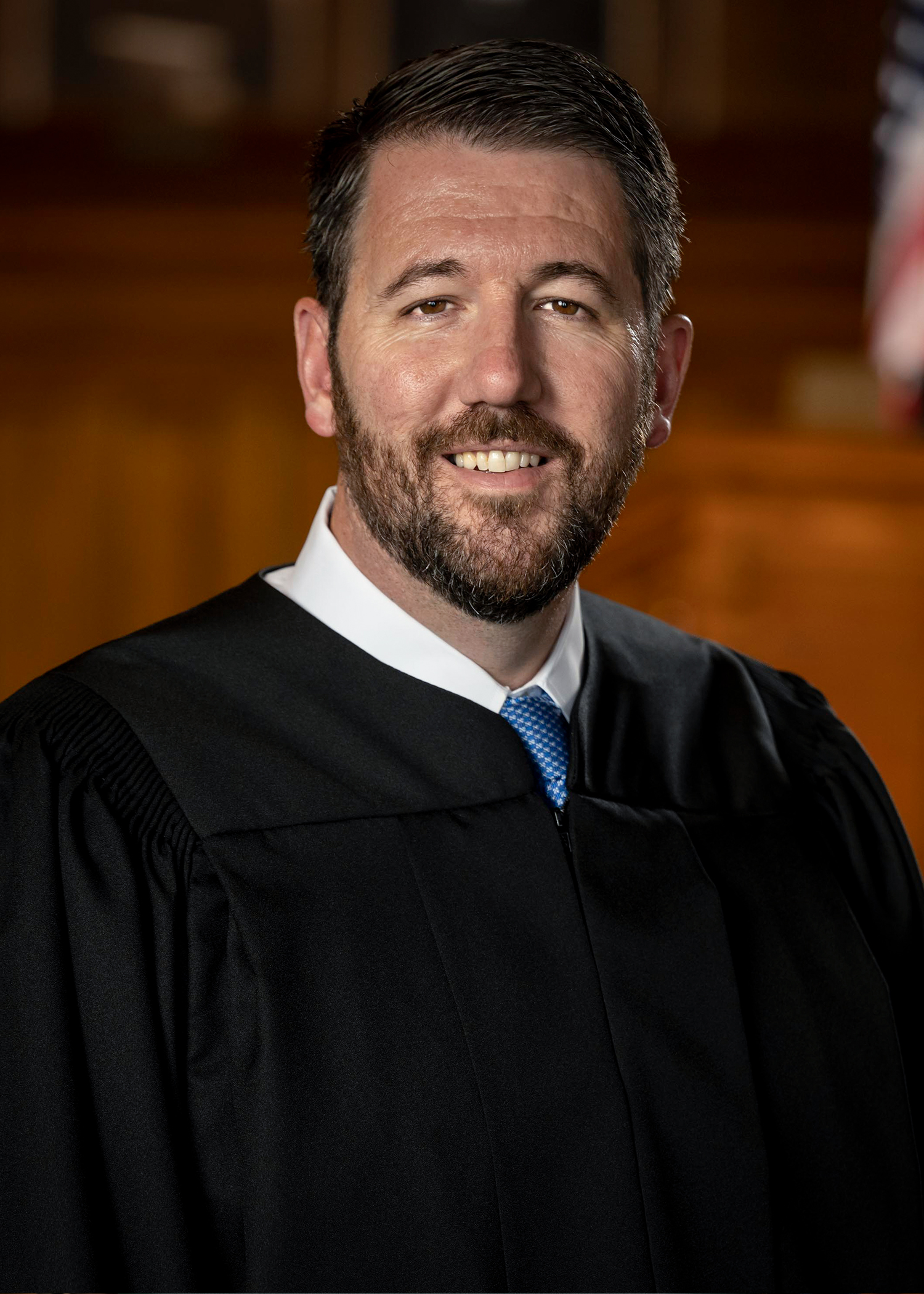

Justice of the Indiana Supreme Court
- Incumbent
- Assumed office September 1, 2022
- Appointed by: Eric Holcomb
- Preceded by: Steven H. David

Personal details
- Born: Derek Read Molter; February 16, 1982 (age 43); Lafayette, Indiana, U.S.
- Education: Indiana University Bloomington (BA, JD)

Derek Read Molter (born February 16, 1982) is an American lawyer from Indiana who serves as a justice of the Indiana Supreme Court since 2022, after he was appointed by Governor Eric Holcomb. He previously served as a judge of the Indiana Court of Appeals from 2021 to 2022.

== Early life and education ==
Molter was born on February 16, 1982, in Lafayette, Indiana. He is a graduate of South Newton High School. He received a Bachelor of Arts, with high distinction, from Indiana University Bloomington in 2004. While at Indiana University he was elected to Phi Beta Kappa and was also active in student government. He earned a Juris Doctor, magna cum laude, from Indiana University Maurer School of Law in 2007. While in law school, he was the executive notes & comments editor for the Indiana Law Journal and a member of the Order of the Coif, graduating in the top three percent of his class.

== Legal career ==
Molter served as a law clerk for Judge Theresa Lazar Springmann of the United States District Court for the Northern District of Indiana. He also worked as a legal intern for the United States House Committee on the Judiciary. He was then an attorney with Arnold & Porter in Washington, D.C. In 2013, Molter was a partner at Ice Miller in Indianapolis, serving as part of the litigation and intellectual property group.

== Judicial career ==
=== Indiana Court of Appeals ===
In August 2021, Molter was appointed as a judge of the Indiana Court of Appeals by Governor Eric Holcomb to replace retiring Judge James S. Kirsch. He was sworn into office on October 1, 2021. His service on the court of appeals terminated when he was elevated to the Indiana Supreme Court.

=== Indiana Supreme Court ===
In April 2022, Molter was one of three names submitted to the governor to fill the upcoming vacancy. On June 10, 2022, Molter was appointed as a justice of the Indiana Supreme Court to fill the then upcoming vacancy due to the retirement of Justice Steven H. David, who announced he would retire in fall 2022. David retired on August 31, 2022 and Molter was sworn in on September 1, 2022.

== Memberships ==
Molter serves on the Board of Directors of the Indianapolis Legal Aid Society. Before becoming a judge, Molter served as a member of the National Center for State Courts Lawyers Committee, the Council for Appellate Lawyers, the Indiana State Bar Association's Appellate Practice Section Council, the Indianapolis Bar Association, and he served a term as the Newton County Bar Association president.

Legal offices
Preceded by Steven H. David	Justice of the Indiana Supreme Court; 2022–present	Incumbent
