= Lisa Wen-Jia Wang =

American judge (born 1980)

Lisa Wang
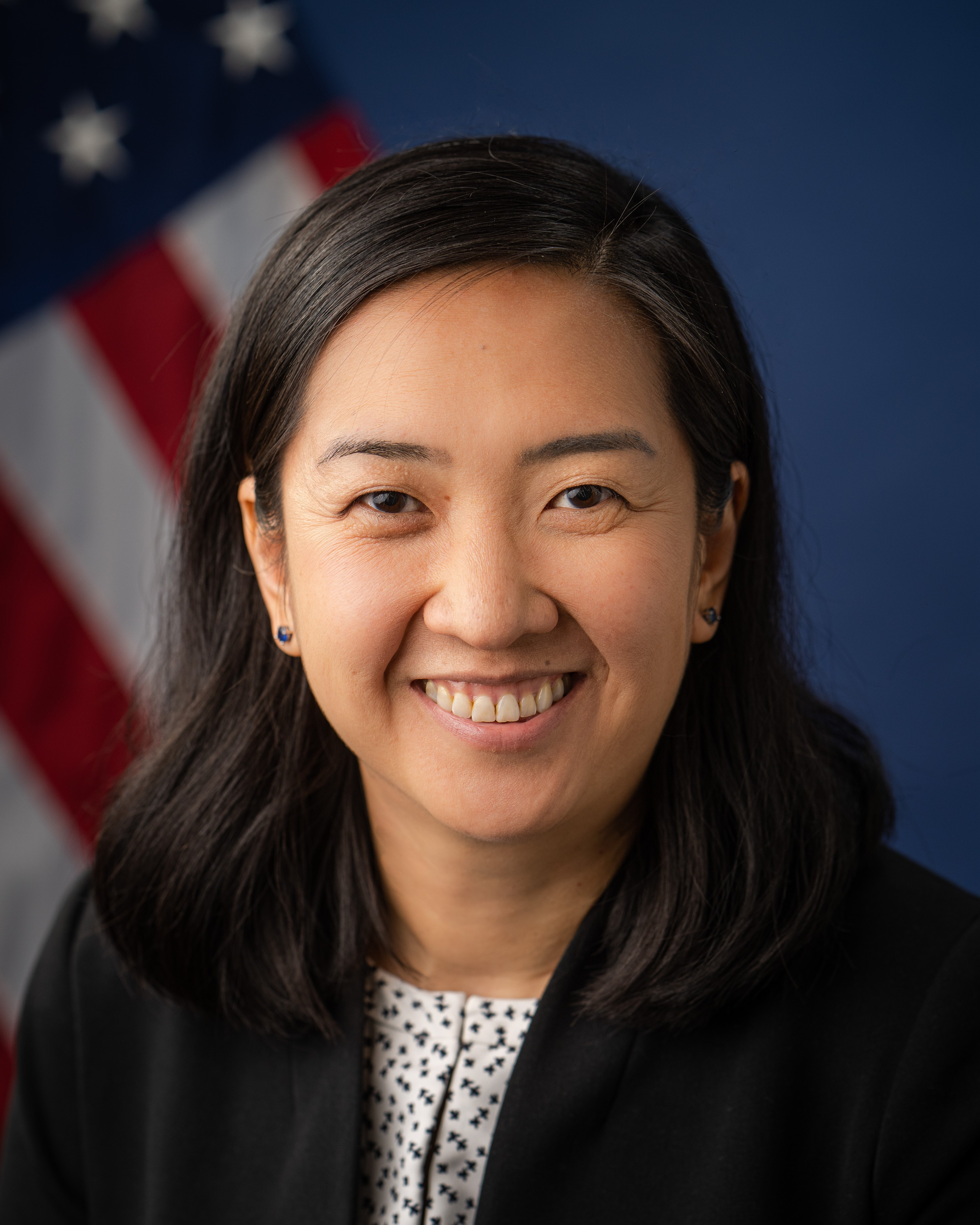

Judge of the United States Court of International Trade
- Incumbent
- Assumed office February 7, 2024
- Appointed by: Joe Biden
- Preceded by: Leo M. Gordon

Assistant Secretary of Commerce for Enforcement and Compliance
- In office January 6, 2022 – February 7, 2024
- Appointed by: Joe Biden
- Preceded by: Jeffrey I. Kessler

Personal details
- Born: Wen-Jia Wang; 1980 (age 45–46) Beijing, China
- Party: Democratic
- Education: Cornell University (BS); Georgetown University (JD)

Lisa Wen-Jia Wang (born 1980) is a Chinese-American lawyer from Washington, D.C. who has served as a United States judge of the United States Court of International Trade since 2024.

== Early life and education ==
Wang was born to Tina Congying Wang and Frank Xiaohang Wang in Beijing, China. Her family immigrated to the United States when she was five. She grew up in East Greenbush, New York.

She earned a Bachelor of Science from Cornell University in 2002 and a Juris Doctor from Georgetown University Law Center in 2006.

== Career ==
From 2006 to 2009, she was an associate with Dewey and LeBoeuf L.L.P. She also worked at a private law firm, where she specialized in trade law. From 2009 to 2012, she was the senior import administration officer for the U.S. Embassy in Beijing, China. From 2012 to 2014, she was an assistant general counsel in the Office of the United States Trade Representative. From 2014 to 2016, she was a senior attorney in the Office of the Chief Counsel for Trade Enforcement and Compliance in the U.S. Department of Commerce.

On July 13, 2021, President Joe Biden nominated Wang to serve as the assistant secretary for enforcement and compliance at the Department of Commerce. She was confirmed by the Senate on December 16, 2021. She was sworn in on January 6, 2022. She also served as the Department of Commerce's delegate on the Interagency Working Group for the White House Initiative on Asian Americans, Native Hawaiians, and Pacific Islanders.

=== Trade court service ===
On June 28, 2023, President Joe Biden announced his intent to nominate Wang to serve as a United States judge of the United States Court of International Trade. On July 11, 2023, her nomination was sent to the Senate. President Biden nominated Wang to the seat vacated by Judge Leo M. Gordon, who assumed senior status on March 22, 2019. On July 26, 2023, a hearing on her nomination was held before the Senate Judiciary Committee. On September 14, 2023, her nomination was reported out of committee by a 12–9 vote. On January 3, 2024, her nomination was returned to the president under Rule XXXI, Paragraph 6 of the United States Senate and she was renominated on January 8, 2024. On January 18, 2024, her nomination was reported out of committee by a 12–9 vote. On February 1, 2024, the Senate invoked cloture on her nomination by a 53–43 vote. Later that day, her nomination was confirmed by a 53–42 vote. She received her commission on February 7, 2024.

== Personal life ==
Wang is married and has two daughters.

== See also ==
- List of Asian American jurists

Legal offices
Preceded by Leo M. Gordon	Judge of the United States Court of International Trade; 2024–present	Incumbent
