= Thomas J. Aquilino =

American judge (born 1939)

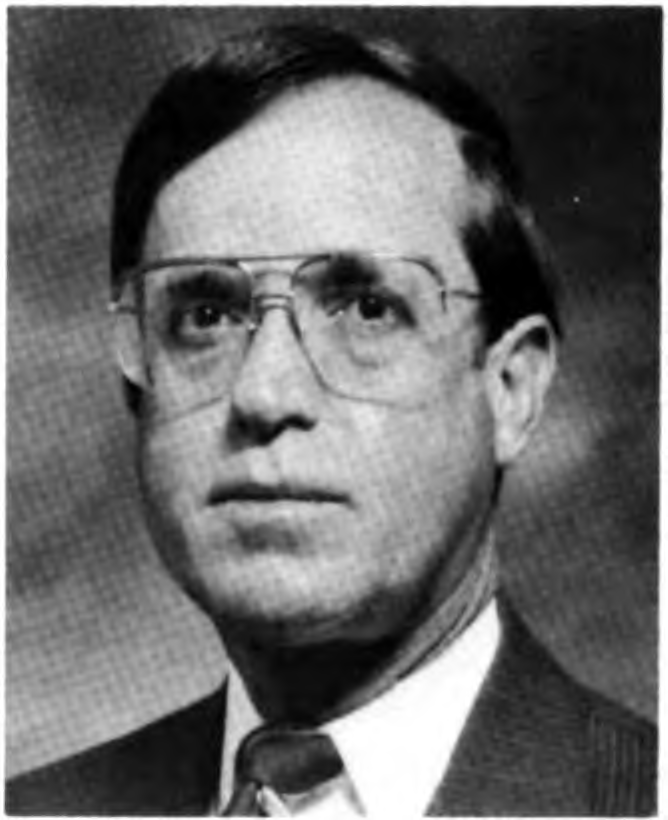

Senior Judge of the United States Court of International Trade
- Incumbent
- Assumed office December 10, 2004

Judge of the United States Court of International Trade
- In office April 4, 1985 – December 10, 2004
- Appointed by: Ronald Reagan
- Preceded by: Frederick Landis Jr.
- Succeeded by: Leo M. Gordon

Personal details
- Born: Thomas Joseph Aquilino Jr. December 7, 1939 (age 86) Mount Kisco, New York, U.S.
- Education: Drew University (BA); Rutgers Law School (JD)

Thomas Joseph Aquilino Jr. (born December 7, 1939) is a Senior United States Judge of the United States Court of International Trade.

== Biography ==
Aquilino was born in 1939 in Mount Kisco, New York. He received a Bachelor of Arts degree in 1962 from Drew University. He received a Juris Doctor in 1969 from Rutgers Law School Newark campus. He served in the United States Army from 1962 to 1965. He served as a law clerk to Judge John Matthew Cannella of the United States District Court for the Southern District of New York from 1969 to 1971. He worked in private practice in New York City from 1971 to 1985. He was an adjunct professor of law at the Benjamin N. Cardozo School of Law from 1984 to 1995.

== Trade court service ==
On February 25, 1985, President Reagan nominated Aquilino to be a Judge of the United States Court of International Trade, to the seat vacated by Judge Frederick Landis Jr. He was confirmed by the United States Senate on April 3, 1985, and received his commission the following day. He took senior status on December 10, 2004, and was succeeded by Judge Leo M. Gordon. As of December 2025, Aquilino appears to be inactive.

Legal offices
Preceded by Frederick Landis Jr.	Judge of the United States Court of International Trade; 1985–2004	Succeeded by Leo M. Gordon
