= Frederick Rakestraw =

American judge (1923–2004)

Justice of the Indiana Supreme Court
- In office January 7, 1966 – January 2, 1967
- Appointed by: Roger D. Branigin
- Preceded by: Frederick Landis Jr.
- Succeeded by: Donald Mote

Frederick Eugene Rakestraw (August 29, 1923 – August 18, 2004) was an American lawyer, politician, and judge who served as a justice of the Indiana Supreme Court from January 7, 1966, to January 2, 1967.

== Biography ==
Rakestraw was born in Lima, Ohio to John Franklin and Hettie Rakestraw (née Driver).

Rakestraw attended public school in Lima. In high school, Rakestraw was a member of the Ohio state championship debate team.

Rakestraw attended Manchester University in North Manchester, Indiana, for two years before joining Army during the Second World War. He served as a member of Signal Corps in the European Theatre. After the war, Rakestraw received his LL.B. from the Indiana University Maurer School of Law in 1947. He was admitted to the bar in 1949.

After graduating, Rakestraw practiced law in Akron, Ohio, at the firm of William Deniston. He then moved back to Indiana, settling in Fulton County. In 1954, Rakestraw, a Democrat, was elected judge of the Fulton County Circuit Court. He was the first Democrat elected in the county in 18 years. He served in the position for 11 years.

Rakestraw became a justice of the Indiana Supreme Court in 1966, appointed by Governor Roger D. Branigin to succeed the resigning Justice Frederick Landis Jr. He left the court in 1967, succeeded by Justice Donald Mote.

After leaving the court, Rakestraw began practicing law in Plymouth before returning to Fulton County to practice law in Rochester.

Rakestraw was a member of the First Christian Church, a Disciples of Christ church in Rochester, where he served as an Elder, Board Chairman, and Sunday school teacher for 45 years. Rakestraw was also a member of the local Kiwanis Club for 45 years. Rakestraw also became a patron of his alma mater, Manchester University.

Rakestraw married Wilodean Weimer in 1943 in Wabash County. They had four children, two sons and two daughters.

Rakestraw died in 2004. The Fulton County Community Foundation gives out an annual scholarship named for Rakestraw.

Political offices
Preceded by Frederick Landis Jr.	Justice of the Indiana Supreme Court; 1966–1967	Succeeded by Donald Mote
