= Steven H. David =

American judge

Steven David
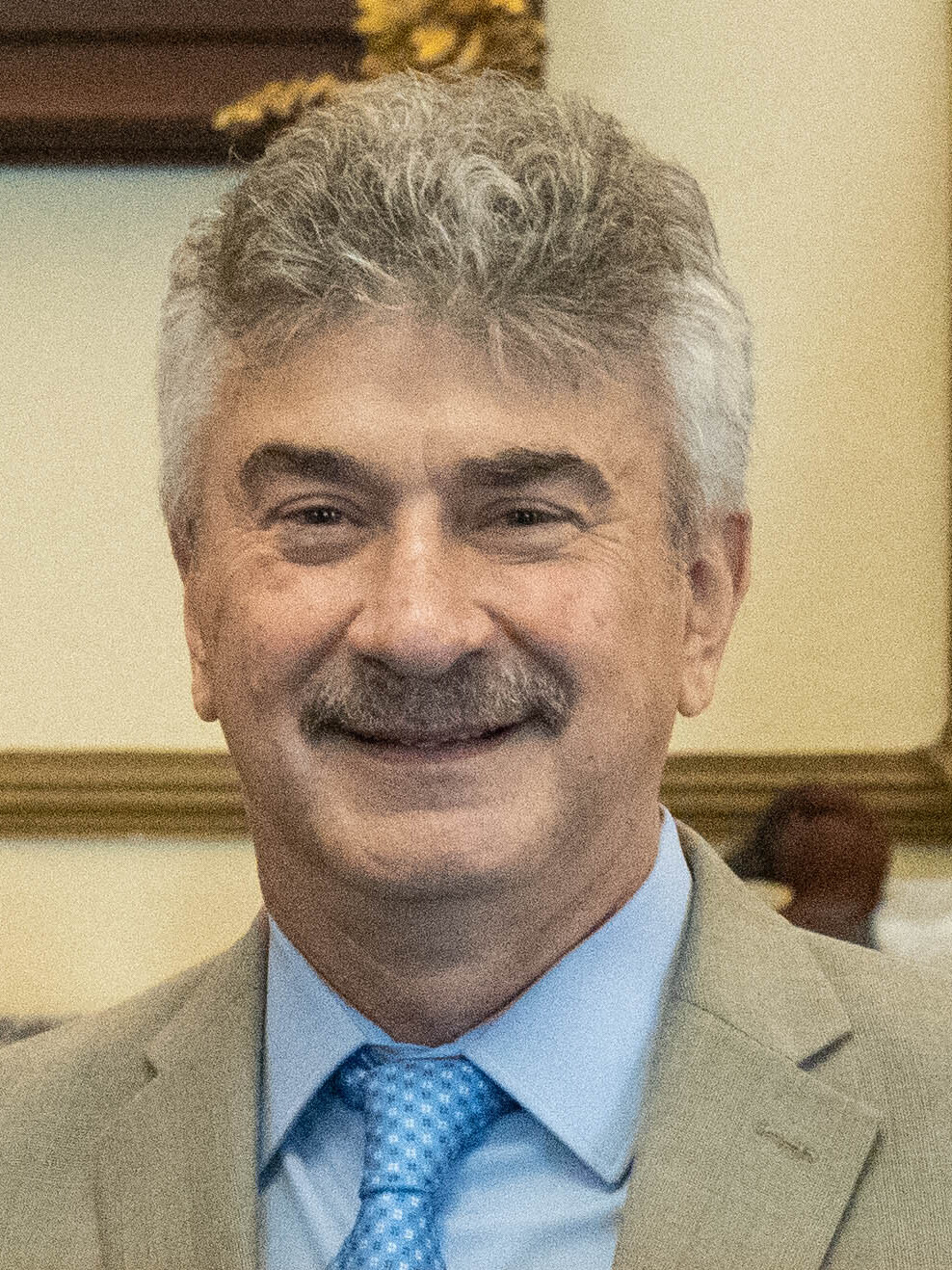

Justice of the Indiana Supreme Court
- In office October 18, 2010 – August 31, 2022
- Nominated by: Mitch Daniels
- Preceded by: Theodore R. Boehm
- Succeeded by: Derek R. Molter

Personal details
- Born: 1957 (age 68–69) Allen County, Indiana
- Occupation: Military officer, judge
- Known for: Indiana Supreme Court, military service

Steven H. David (born 1957) is a former justice of the Indiana Supreme Court. He previously served as a lawyer and military officer. He retired from the United States Army Reserve in September 2010 with the rank of colonel.

== Biography ==
David was born in Allen County, Indiana, and raised in Bartholomew County, Indiana.

== Education ==
David graduated magna cum laude from Murray State University as a Distinguished Military Graduate on an R.O.T.C. scholarship. He earned his law degree from Robert H. McKinney School of Law. He is also a graduate of the Indiana Judicial College and the Graduate Program for Indiana Judges.

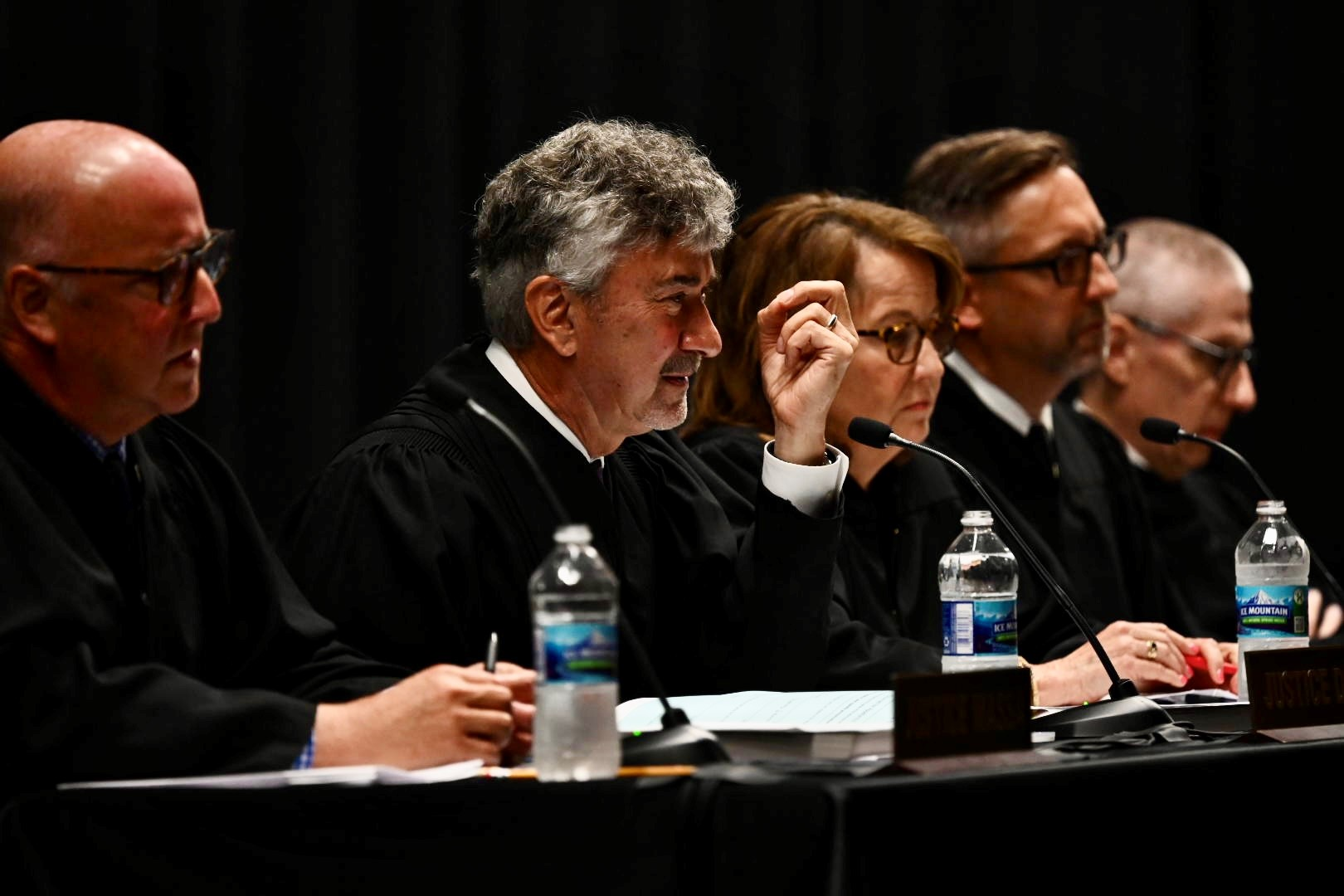
Steven H. David (second to the left) with the Indiana Supreme Court at Lebanon High School in Boone County, Indiana in celebration of his final oral argument with the court

== Legal career ==
David's civilian legal career began in Columbus, Indiana, where he focused on personal injury, family law, and civil litigation. He later became in-house counsel for Mayflower Transit, Inc., before moving to Boone County, where he was elected circuit court judge. As a trial court judge, he presided over civil, criminal, family, and juvenile matters.

David served as a chief defense counsel for prisoners at the Guantanamo Bay detention camp when they were tried by the Guantanamo military commission. While serving in that capacity, he complained in 2008 that he lacked sufficient defense lawyers and other resources to defend the prisoners. David personally represented Salim Ahmed Hamdan, Osama bin Laden's driver. After the commission convicted Hamdan, David broadly criticized the commission's loose procedures, including acceptance of hearsay and secret testimony, restrictions on media coverage, and suppression of evidence of abusive interrogations. He called for scrapping the commission system.

In October 2010, Indiana Governor Mitch Daniels appointed David to the Indiana Supreme Court. He also serves as an adjunct professor at Indiana University Robert H. McKinney School of Law. David retired on August 31, 2022.

=== Notable opinion ===
David wrote the majority opinion in Barnes vs. Indiana.

Legal offices
Preceded by Theodore R. Boehm	Associate Justice of the Indiana Supreme Court; 2010–2022	Succeeded by Derek R. Molter
