= Floyd Draper =

American judge (1893–1980)

Floyd S. Draper (October 17, 1893 – March 20, 1980) was a justice of the Indiana Supreme Court from January 2, 1951, to January 10, 1955.

Born in Fulton, New York, Draper graduated from high school in Watertown, New York, and received his law degree from the Valparaiso University School of Law in 1915. Draper became chief deputy prosecutor for Lake County, Indiana in 1923.

He became city attorney of Gary, Indiana in 1939, and in 1942 was elected to a seat on the Indiana Court of Appeals. He was re-elected in 1946, serving for eight years in total before his election to the Indiana Supreme Court. Draper was elected to the Indiana Supreme Court in 1950, taking office on January 2, 1951. Richard M. Givan, later Chief Justice of the court, was a law clerk for Draper. Givan remembered Draper as being "on the conservative side" among the judges, particularly in taking "a harder line with criminals".

Draper resigned from the court on January 10, 1955, a year before the expiration of his term, because of the poor health of his brother, Alfred P. Draper, also an attorney. In July 1955, Alfred died in a fall from a sixth-floor window in Gary, Indiana. Draper retired from legal practice in 1958, moving to Florida in his retirement.

In 1959, Draper returned to Indiana for one year to serve as the presiding judge of the Lake County Criminal Court, appointed to that position by Governor Harold W. Handley following the death of judge William J. Murray.

Draper died in Bradenton, Florida.

Political offices
| Preceded by Oliver Starr | Justice of the Indiana Supreme Court; 1951–1955 | Succeeded by Isadore E. Levine |
