= Wildwood Cemetery (Winchester, Massachusetts) =

Historic rural cemetery

- U.S. National Register of Historic Places
- U.S. Historic district – Contributing property
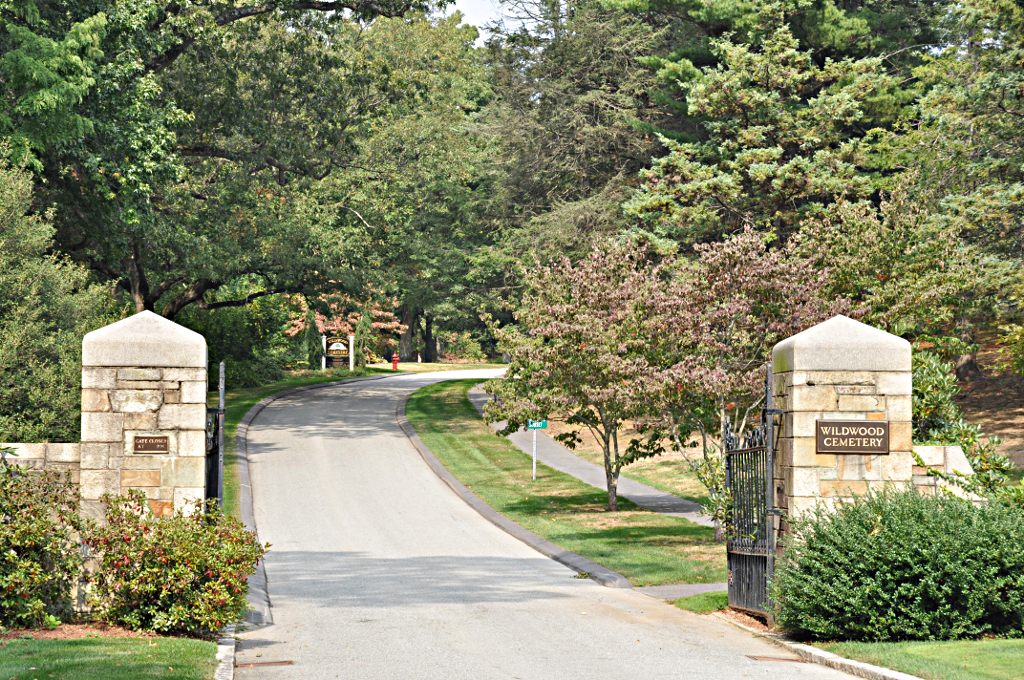

- Location within Massachusetts Location within the United States
- Location: 34 Palmer Street, Winchester, Massachusetts
- Coordinates: 42°27′17″N 71°8′48″W
- Area: 70.5 acres (28.5 ha)
- Built: 1851
- Architect: Amasa Farrier
- Part of: Middlesex Canal Historic and Archaeological District (ID09000936)
- MPS: Winchester MRA
- NRHP reference No.: 89000658

Significant dates
- Added to NRHP: July 5, 1989
- Designated CP: November 19, 2009

Wildwood Cemetery is a historic cemetery at Palmer and Wildwood Streets in Winchester, Massachusetts.

The cemetery was founded in 1851 and added to the National Register of Historic Places in 1989. This cemetery was established using part of the $3000 gift from Colonel William P. Winchester that was donated on condition that the town be named after him. It was one of the first public spaces laid out after Winchester was incorporated, on land just west of the former Middlesex Canal. It is laid out in the rural cemetery fashion popular in the mid-19th century, with winding lanes a country landscaping. The designer was Amasa Farrier of neighboring Stoneham, who used as his inspiration the published works of Andrew Jackson Downing and John Claudius Loudon. Land was purchased in 1851, and was ready for use the following year. Older graves from the small cemetery at the First Congregational Church were transferred here in 1853. As a result, the oldest dated burials are in 1805. The entrance gateway was added as part of a landscape design developed by the Olmsted Brothers in 1937.

Notable persons buried in the cemetery include Massachusetts Governor Samuel Walker McCall (1851–1923), Rev. Howard James Chidley (1878–1966), engineer Harold Kilbrith Barrows (1873–1954), linguist Joshua Whatmough (1897–1964), artist Joseph Foxcroft Cole (1837–1892), and artist Dana Pond (1881–1962). Other prominent burials include philanthropist and peace activist Edwin Ginn, local developer David Skilling, and Harrison Parker, owner of a local mill. It is also the burial ground for many members of locally prominent families, including members of the Symmes, Locke, Richardson, and Johnson families.

== See also ==
- National Register of Historic Places listings in Winchester, Massachusetts
