= Harry Irving Thayer =

American politician (1869-1926)

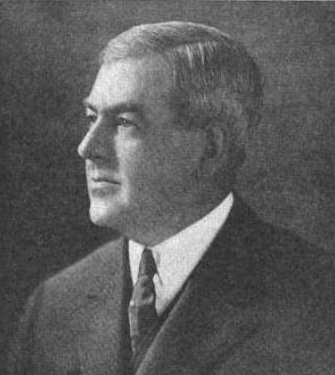

Member of the U.S. House of Representatives from Massachusetts's 8th district
- In office March 4, 1925 – March 10, 1926
- Preceded by: Frederick W. Dallinger
- Succeeded by: Frederick W. Dallinger

Personal details
- Born: September 10, 1869 Pembroke, Massachusetts, US
- Died: March 10, 1926 (aged 56) Wakefield, Massachusetts, US
- Party: Republican
- Occupation: Businessman

Harry Irving Thayer (September 10, 1869 – March 10, 1926) was a member of the United States House of Representatives from Massachusetts. He was born in Pembroke on September 10, 1869. He attended the public schools of Hanover and engaged in the leather business. He was an organizer and president of the Thayer-Ross Co., president of the New England Shoe and Leather Association, and president of the Tanners’ Council of the United States. Thayer was a delegate to the Republican National Convention in 1924, and was elected as a Republican to the Sixty-ninth Congress. He served from March 4, 1925, until his death in Wakefield on March 10, 1926. His interment was in Lakeside Cemetery.

== See also ==
- List of members of the United States Congress who died in office (1900–1949)

U.S. House of Representatives
Preceded by Frederick Dallinger	Member of the U.S. House of Representatives from Massachusetts's 8th congressional district March 4, 1925 – March 10, 1926	Succeeded by Frederick Dallinger
