= Frank Gilkison =

American judge (1877–1955)

Justice of the Indiana Supreme Court
- In office January 1, 1945 – February 25, 1955
- Preceded by: Curtis Shake
- Succeeded by: George Henley

Francis Earl Gilkison (November 3, 1877 – February 25, 1955) was an American lawyer, politician, and judge who served as a justice of the Indiana Supreme Court from January 1, 1945, to February 25, 1955.

== Biography ==
Gilkison was born in Rutherford Township, Martin County, Indiana.

Gilkison received his primary education in a schoolhouse close to home before having to become a boarder to attend secondary school in Shoals and Loogootee.

He received his legal education from the Indiana University Maurer School of Law, entering the school in 1899 and graduating in 1901.

Gilkison returned to Martin County and practiced law in Shoals from 1901 to 1935. From 1907 to 1909, he was a deputy prosecutor.

From 1935 to 1945, Gilkison, a Republican, served as judge of the 49th Circuit Court (comprising Martin and Daviess counties). After becoming a judge, Gilkison's law office in Shoals was taken over by William E. Jenner, a local lawyer who later became a U.S. Senator from Indiana.

Gilkison married Eva Edwards. Their son, Frank Jr. (1926–2015) became a prominent lawyer in Muncie.

Gilkison became a judge of the Indiana Supreme Court in 1945, succeeding Justice Curtis Shake. During his time on the court, Gilkison distinguished himself as a defender of personal liberty and inalienable rights. Gilkison also defended the value of human life over the rights of property owners, providing two influential dissenting opinions in cases involving the rights of property owners conflicting with the safety of children.

During his time on the court, Gilkison was involved in the controversial case of Ott Workman, an affluent Martin County farmer who was sentenced to life in prison for masterminding a scheme to rob his own brother-in-law, which ended with his brother-in-law being shot. Workman was rumored to be connected with a gang of criminals in Martin County and was connected to two unsolved murders. He was briefly granted parole and released from prison for twenty-five days in 1945. In 1949, Gilkison claimed that certain state politicians and government officials had bribed officials of the Indiana Prison Administration to accomplish this, paying the prison officials "fabulous sums" of money in exchange for Workman being given parole. Gilkison claimed he knew who specifically had paid the bribe, but refused to provide any names.

Gilkison unexpectedly died in office in 1955, at the age of 77. He was succeeded by Justice George Henley.

Political offices
Preceded by Curtis Shake	Justice of the Indiana Supreme Court; 1945–1955	Succeeded by George Henley
