= Charles Drummond Lawrence =

American judge (1878-1975)

Senior Judge of the United States Customs Court
- In office March 31, 1965 – February 12, 1975

Judge of the United States Customs Court
- In office February 22, 1943 – March 31, 1965
- Appointed by: Franklin D. Roosevelt
- Preceded by: Frederick W. Dallinger
- Succeeded by: Frederick Landis Jr.

Personal details
- Born: Charles Drummond Lawrence; August 5, 1878 North Yarmouth, Maine, U.S.
- Died: February 12, 1975 (aged 96) New York City, New York, U.S.
- Spouse: Lucy Baldwin Borst (m. 1905)
- Education: New York Law School (LL.B.); New York University School of Law (LL.M.)

Charles Drummond Lawrence (August 5, 1878 – February 12, 1975) was a judge of the United States Customs Court.

== Education and career ==
Born on August 5, 1878, in North Yarmouth, Maine, Lawrence received a Bachelor of Laws in 1902 from New York Law School. He received a Master of Laws in 1905 from New York University School of Law. Lawrence served as a law clerk to the United States Board of General Appraisers from 1899 to 1903. He served as assistant counsel for the United States Department of the Treasury in New York City, New York from 1903 to 1907. He served as assistant solicitor of customs for the United States Customs Bureau in New York City from 1907 to 1910. He served as special attorney of the Customs Division of the United States Department of Justice in New York City from 1910 to 1925. He served as assistant attorney general for customs of the Customs Division of the Justice Department in New York City from 1925 to 1934. He served as special assistant to the attorney general for the Customs Division of the Justice Department in New York City from 1934 to 1943.

== Federal judicial service ==
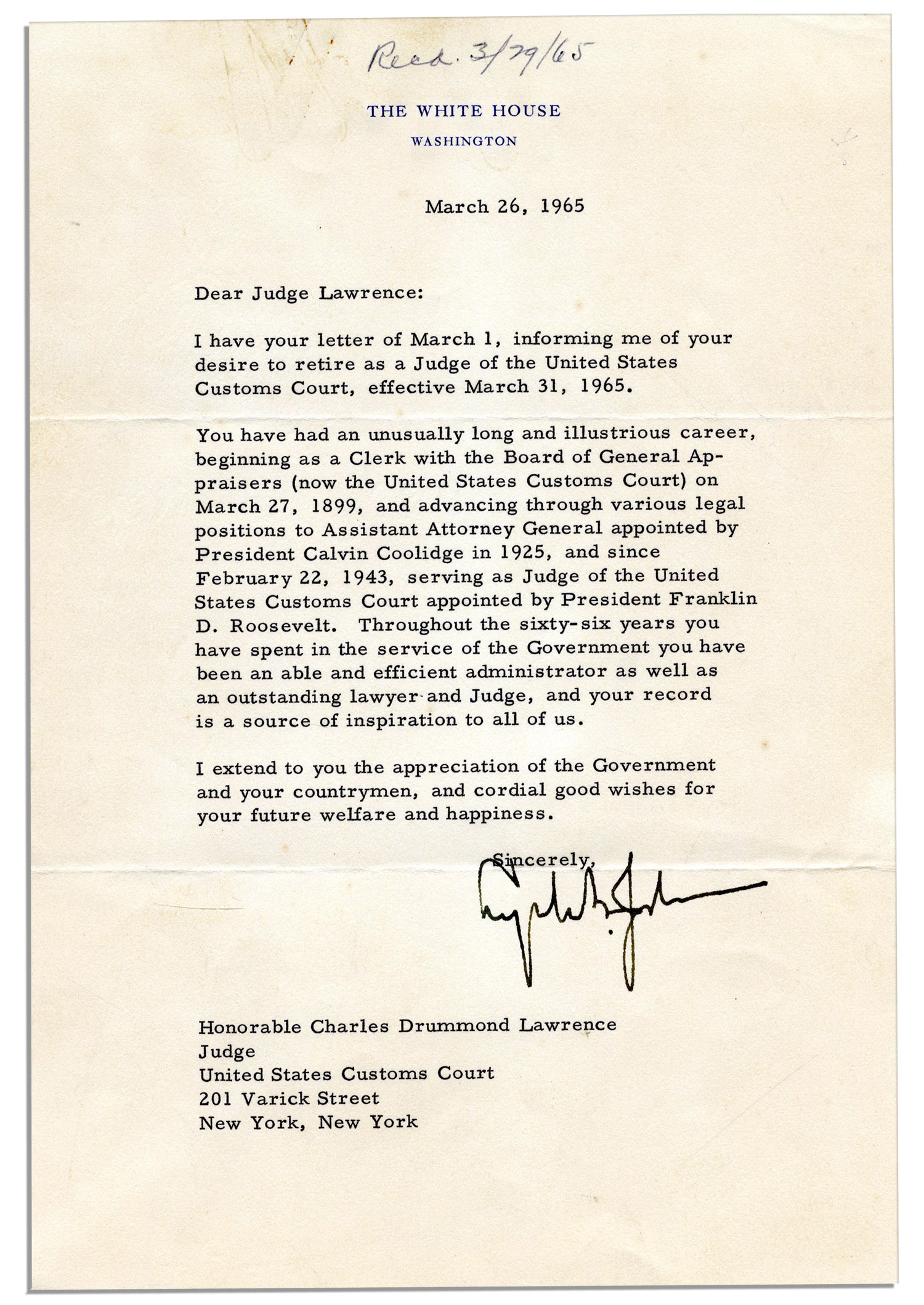
LBJ letter to Charles Drummond Lawrence (1965)

Lawrence was nominated by President Franklin D. Roosevelt on February 1, 1943, to a seat on the United States Customs Court vacated by Judge Frederick W. Dallinger. He was confirmed by the United States Senate on February 18, 1943, and received his commission on February 22, 1943. Lawrence was initially appointed as a Judge under Article I, but the court was raised to Article III status by operation of law on July 14, 1956, and Lawrence thereafter served as an Article III Judge. He assumed senior status on March 31, 1965. His service terminated on February 12, 1975, due to his death in New York City.

== Sources ==
Legal offices
Preceded by Frederick W. Dallinger	Judge of the United States Customs Court; 1943–1965	Succeeded by Frederick Landis Jr.
