= Frederick Landis Jr. =

American judge (1912–1990)

Senior Judge of the United States Court of International Trade
- In office December 31, 1983 – March 1, 1990

Judge of the United States Court of International Trade
- In office November 1, 1980 – December 31, 1983
- Appointed by: operation of law
- Preceded by: Seat established by 94 Stat 1727
- Succeeded by: Thomas J. Aquilino

Judge of the United States Customs Court
- In office October 16, 1965 – November 1, 1980
- Appointed by: Lyndon B. Johnson
- Preceded by: Charles Drummond Lawrence
- Succeeded by: Seat abolished

Personal details
- Born: Frederick Landis Jr. January 17, 1912 Logansport, Indiana, U.S.
- Died: March 1, 1990 (aged 78) Carmel, Indiana, U.S.
- Education: Indiana University Bloomington (AB); Indiana University Maurer School of Law (LLB)

Frederick Landis Jr. (January 17, 1912 – March 1, 1990) was a judge of the United States Court of International Trade.

== Education and career ==
Born January 17, 1912, in Logansport, Indiana, Landis received an Artium Baccalaureus degree in 1932 from Indiana University Bloomington and a Bachelor of Laws in 1934 from Indiana University Maurer School of Law. He entered private practice in Logansport from 1935 to 1955. He was a Deputy Prosecutor for the Twenty-Ninth Judicial District in Indiana from 1935 to 1936. He was the Prosecutor for the Twenty-Ninth Judicial District from 1938 to 1940. He was a United States Naval Reserve lieutenant from 1942 to 1946. He was a member of the Indiana House of Representatives from 1950 to 1952. He was member of the Indiana Senate from 1952 to 1955. He was a Justice of the Indiana Supreme Court from 1955 to 1965.

== Federal judicial service ==
Landis was nominated by President Lyndon B. Johnson on October 6, 1965, to a seat on the United States Customs Court vacated by Judge Charles Drummond Lawrence. He was confirmed by the United States Senate on October 15, 1965, and received his commission on October 16, 1965. He was reassigned by operation of law to the United States Court of International Trade on November 1, 1980, to a new seat authorized by 94 Stat. 1727. He assumed senior status on December 31, 1983. His service terminated on March 1, 1990, due to his death in Carmel, Indiana.

== Sources ==
Legal offices
Preceded by Isadore E. Levine	Justice of the Indiana Supreme Court; 1955–1965	Succeeded by Frederick E. Rakestraw
Preceded by Charles Drummond Lawrence	Judge of the United States Customs Court; 1965–1980	Succeeded by Seat abolished
Preceded by Seat established by 94 Stat 1727	Judge of the United States Court of International Trade; 1980–1983	Succeeded by Thomas J. Aquilino
