= Walter Emanuel Treanor =

American judge (1883–1941)

Judge of the United States Court of Appeals for the Seventh Circuit
- In office December 27, 1937 – April 26, 1941
- Appointed by: Franklin D. Roosevelt
- Preceded by: Samuel Alschuler
- Succeeded by: Sherman Minton

Personal details
- Born: Walter Emanuel Treanor; November 17, 1883 Loogootee, Indiana, US
- Died: April 26, 1941 (aged 57)
- Resting place: Walnut Hill Cemetery (Petersburg, Indiana)
- Education: Indiana University Bloomington (AB); Indiana University Maurer School of Law (LLB); Harvard Law School (SJD)

Walter Emanuel Treanor (November 17, 1883 – April 26, 1941) was a United States circuit judge of the United States Court of Appeals for the Seventh Circuit.

== Education and career ==
Born in Loogootee, Indiana, Treanor received an Artium Baccalaureus degree from Indiana University Bloomington in 1912, a Bachelor of Laws from Indiana University Maurer School of Law in 1922, and a Doctor of Juridical Science from Harvard Law School in 1927. He was in the United States Army during World War I from 1917 to 1919, achieving the rank of Second Lieutenant. He was a professor of law at Indiana University Maurer School of Law from 1922 to 1930. He was a justice of the Indiana Supreme Court from 1930 to 1936.

== Federal judicial service ==
On December 11, 1937, Treanor was nominated by President Franklin D. Roosevelt to the seat on the United States Court of Appeals for the Seventh Circuit vacated by Judge Samuel Alschuler. Treanor was confirmed by the United States Senate on December 21, 1937, and received his commission on December 27, 1937. Treanor served in that capacity until his death on April 26, 1941. He was interred in Walnut Hill Cemetery, Petersburg, Indiana.

== Sources ==
Legal offices
Preceded by Benjamin W. Willoughby	Justice of the Indiana Supreme Court; 1931–1937	Succeeded by Curtis Shake
Preceded by Samuel Alschuler	Judge of the United States Court of Appeals for the Seventh Circuit; 1937–1941	Succeeded by Sherman Minton
