= Norman Arterburn =

American judge (1902–1979)

Justice of the Indiana Supreme Court
- In office May 23, 1955 – May 13, 1977
- Appointed by: George N. Craig
- Preceded by: George Henley
- Succeeded by: Alfred Pivarnik

Personal details
- Born: Norman Frank Arterburn; May 13, 1902; Bicknell, Indiana, U.S.
- Died: February 10, 1979 (aged 76); Florida, U.S.
- Spouse: Lois Richards
- Children: 3
- Education: Indiana University Maurer School of Law (AB); University of Chicago Law School (JD)
- Profession: Politician, lawyer, judge

Norman Frank Arterburn (May 13, 1902 – February 10, 1979) was an American lawyer, politician, and judge who served as a justice of the Indiana Supreme Court from May 23, 1955, to May 13, 1977.

== Biography ==
Arterburn was born in Bicknell, Indiana.

Arterburn attended Indiana University Maurer School of Law in Bloomington, graduating with an A.B. and being admitted to the bar in 1923. He received a J.D. in 1926 from the University of Chicago Law School.

From 1926 to 1927, Arterburn lived in Kansas, teaching law at Washburn University School of Law in Topeka.

Arterburn returned to Knox County after graduation. He practiced law in Vincennes from 1927 to 1955. In 1931, he joined the firm of Kessing, Hill, & Arterburn. In 1928, Arterburn was elected to a one-year term as Knox County prosecutor.

From 1938 to 1944, Arterburn was a member of the Indiana Board of Law Examiners.

In 1949 and then again from 1953 to 1954, Arterburn taught at his alma mater of the Indiana University Maurer School of Law as a visiting professor.

In 1955, Governor George N. Craig appointed Arterburn to the Indiana Supreme Court to replace the resigning Justice George Henley. He was re-elected to the court three times (1958, 1962, and 1968). Arterburn was selected to be the court's first permanent Chief Justice following the amendment to the state constitution in 1970. Before the amendment, the title of Chief Justice rotated among the court's justices. Arterburn served as chief justice until 1974. He left the court in 1977, succeeded by Justice Alfred Pivarnik.

Arterburn was a member of the Knox County Bar Association (serving as the Association's treasurer), Indiana State Bar Association (serving on the Association's Board of Managers), and the American Bar Association. He also served as President of the Vincennes Chamber of Commerce, the Vincennes Kiwanis Club, and the Good Samaritan Hospital Board.

Arterburn married Lois Richards. They had three children, all daughters. Lois Arterburn died in 1968. Norman Arterburn remarried to Loretta L. Holl (1932–2020) in 1971.

Arterburn died in Florida in 1979.

Political offices
Preceded by George Henley	Justice of the Indiana Supreme Court; 1955–1977	Succeeded by Alfred Pivarnik
