= Leo M. Gordon =

American judge (born 1952)

Leo Maury Gordon

Senior Judge of the United States Court of International Trade
- Incumbent
- Assumed office March 22, 2019

Judge of the United States Court of International Trade
- In office March 16, 2006 – March 22, 2019
- Appointed by: George W. Bush
- Preceded by: Thomas J. Aquilino
- Succeeded by: Lisa Wang

Personal details
- Born: Leo Maury Gordon; 1952 Newark, New Jersey, U.S.
- Spouse: Marci Spero
- Education: University of North Carolina at Chapel Hill (AB); Emory University (JD)

Leo Maury Gordon (born 1952) is a senior United States judge of the United States Court of International Trade.

== Education and career ==
Gordon was born in 1952 in Newark, New Jersey, attending school at Newark Academy. He received an Artium Baccalaureus degree in 1973 from the University of North Carolina. He received a Juris Doctor in 1977 from the Emory University School of Law. He served as an assistant counsel to the Committee on the Judiciary for the United States House of Representatives from 1977 to 1981. He served as an assistant clerk for the United States Court of International Trade from 1981 to 1999. He served as Clerk of the Court for the Trade Court from 1999 to 2006.

== Trade Court service ==
On November 10, 2005, President George W. Bush nominated Gordon to serve as a Judge of the United States Court of International Trade, to the seat vacated by Judge Thomas J. Aquilino. He was confirmed by the Senate on March 13, 2006 and received his commission on March 16, 2006. He assumed senior status on March 22, 2019.

Legal offices
Preceded by Thomas J. Aquilino	Judge of the United States Court of International Trade; 2006–2019	Succeeded by Lisa Wang
