= Curtis Shake =

American judge (1887–1978)

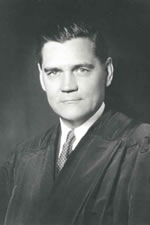
- Judge Curtis Shake

Justice of the Indiana Supreme Court
- In office January 4, 1938 – January 7, 1945
- Nominated by: M. Clifford Townsend
- Preceded by: Walter E. Treanor
- Succeeded by: Frank E. Gilkison

Personal details
- Born: July 14, 1887 Monroe City, Indiana, U.S.
- Died: September 11, 1978 (aged 91)
- Education: Vincennes University; Indiana University Bloomington

Curtis Grover Shake (July 14, 1887 – September 11, 1978), was an American jurist, politician, author, and a member of the Indiana Senate who served as a justice of the Indiana Supreme Court from January 4, 1938, to January 7, 1945, serving as chief justice three separate times (1939, 1941, and 1944). During his career, he was the presiding civilian judge over the IG Farben trial, one of the Nuremberg trials the United States convened at Nuremberg, Germany, from 1947 to 1948 following World War II.

A native of Knox County, Indiana, Shake attended Vincennes University for two years and earned a law degree from Indiana University in 1910. He initially established a law practice in Bicknell, Indiana, but relocated his family and law practice to the county seat at Vincennes in 1916. Shake was elected as a Democrat to represent Knox and Daviess counties in the Indiana Senate in 1926, but lost his bid to become Indiana Attorney General in 1928. Shake presided as a Justice of the Indiana Supreme Court for 7 years; refusing to run for re-election in 1945. Between 1938 and 1946, Shake was also involved at the national level in mediating labor disputes, including service on six presidential emergency boards charged with settling railroad strikes.

In 1947, Shake was appointed presiding judge over the Farben trial at Nuremberg. News reporters harshly criticized the relatively light sentences imposed on those found guilty of war crimes. Years later Shake remarked that although he accepted the legitimacy of the tribunals, he thought an impartial trial from neutral countries using neutral judges would have been preferable. After his return to the United States in 1948, Shake continued to practice law in Vincennes, where he was also a longtime member of Vincennes University's board of trustees from 1923 to 1966. Shake was elected to the Indiana Academy in 1975 for his contributions to Indiana and the nation.

== Early life and education ==
Curtis Grover Shake, the son of Arminda and Daniel Shake, was born in Monroe City, Harrison Township, Knox County, Indiana, on July 14, 1887. Daniel was a farmer and music teacher; Arminda worked as a midwife. Shake completed eighth grade in Knox County's public schools. In 1903, because there were no public high schools in the area, Shake began studies at Vincennes University, where he attended classes for two years to earn a teacher's license. At Vincennes he was a member of Sigma Pi fraternity.

Shake taught in a one-room schoolhouse for two years before deciding to pursue a law career. He moved to Vincennes, Indiana, in the spring of 1907 and began law school at Indiana University in Bloomington that fall. Shake, an avid storyteller, later recalled that while he was living in Vincennes, Jacob Gimbel, owner of a Vincennes department store that later became Gimbels in New York, offered to pay for his law studies at IU as long as he agreed to help another student in a similar manner in the future. Shake agreed to Gimbel's proposal.

Shake earned a law degree from Indiana University in 1910. Among his classmates were Paul V. McNutt, a future governor of Indiana; Sherman Minton, a future associate justice of the U.S. Supreme Court; and Wendell Willkie, the Republican Party's nominee in the 1940 presidential election. Shake also met his first wife, Anna Selesky, a Czech immigrant and a fellow law student, while attending Indiana University. Shake and Anna married in June 1911; their son, Gilbert, was born the following year.

== Career ==
=== Early years ===
Shake established a law practice in Bicknell, Indiana, following his graduation from law school in 1910. After six years in Bicknell, where Shake served as city attorney and as Knox County's deputy prosecuting attorney, he moved his family and law practice to Vincennes in 1916 and formed a law partnership with Joseph W. Kimmel. While living in Vincennes, Shake also held positions as city attorney, U.S. commissioner for the southern Indiana judicial district, and Knox County attorney.

In 1926 Shake was elected as a Democrat to represent Knox and Daviess counties in the Indiana Senate. Shake was an active state senator who coauthored the Lindley-Shake-Johnson law that reduced tax assessments on Indiana farmland.

In 1928 Shake became the Democratic Party's nominee for Indiana Attorney General, but lost the race. A week before the election, John Rabb Emison, a Vincennes lawyer, announced at a Republican Party gathering in Indianapolis that Shake was a former member of the Ku Klux Klan. Emison asserted that Shake had joined Knox County Klan Number 75 on September 30, 1924, and produced a membership book to support the claim. Emison also proclaimed that the Klan had provided Shake with support during his campaign for the Indiana Senate in 1926, but Shake had discontinued paying his membership dues when the Klan organization became unpopular.

It is not known with certainty whether or not Shake was a Klan member. Shake never fully denied Klan membership in his speeches, but he did label the claims "insinuations and false charges." Newspapers of the time did not report that he refuted Emison's claims. Shake blamed his loss on New York Governor Al Smith's nomination in the U.S. presidential election of 1928. Nearly the entire Indiana Democratic slate of candidates, including Shake, were defeated in the elections that year.

After his defeat in the race for Indiana attorney general, Shake continued to practice law in Vincennes for the next ten years. His primary client was the Baltimore and Ohio Railroad. Shake represented the railroad in litigation within a four-county area of southern Indiana. Known as a skilled orator, Shake also delivered speeches in support of Democratic causes and wrote books about Vincennes.

=== Indiana Supreme Court justice ===
In December 1937, Indiana Governor M. Clifford Townsend appointed Shake to the Indiana Supreme Court to fill a vacancy that was created when U.S. President Franklin D. Roosevelt appointed Indiana Supreme Court Justice Walter E. Treanor to the U.S. Court of Appeals for the Seventh Circuit in Chicago. Shake completed the remaining year of Justice Treanor's term on the Indiana Supreme Court and was elected in his own right to a six-year term in 1938. Shake served on the Court from January 4, 1938, to January 7, 1945, and presided as chief justice three times (1939, 1941, and 1944). In the Warren v Indiana Telephone Company case, Shake's opinion resolved a longstanding debate about the Indiana Court of Appeals. Shake rejected the Indiana General Assembly's authority to limit the Court's powers, made the state's Court of Appeals an intermediate court, and brought Indiana's court system into alignment with court systems of the majority of other states.

Shake decided not to run for re-election because he believed that the state's voters would choose Republican candidates in the upcoming election and he wanted to avoid a defeat. At the end of his term on the bench in 1945, Shake returned to Vincennes to practice law with his son, Gilbert. Shake's first wife, Anna, died on November 2, 1946.

Between 1938 and 1946 Shake became involved at the national level in mediating labor disputes. He mediated an estimated 400 labor disputes as a National Mediation Board referee. Shake gained a national reputation when he served on six presidential emergency boards charged with settling railroad strikes, chairing three of these boards from 1944 to 1949.

=== War crime trials in Nuremberg, Germany ===
In early 1947, Shake was appointed presiding judge over the IG Farben trial, one of the war crimes that U.S. authorities held in Nuremberg, Germany, after the end of World War II. Shake, a widower at the time, went to Nuremberg alone. The Farben trial began on August 27, 1947, and concluded in mid-June 1948. The case was primarily based on the Farben defendants' "knowing participation" in "Nazi plans for conquest," even before the war began, and for the Farben firm's use of slave labor in manufacturing synthetic rubber during the war. The company's production site used laborers from the adjacent German concentration camp at Auschwitz, Poland. Shake presided over the tribunal, which rendered its verdicts on July 29–30, 1948, more than a year after the trial began. Ten of the defendants were acquitted on all counts; the remaining thirteen received prison sentences that ranged from two to eight years, considered mild punishments compared to the gravity of the indictments.

News reporters harshly criticized Shake for the relatively light sentences in the Farben case and made allegations that he had been partial to the German defendants, which he denied. Shake countered the criticisms by arguing that the tribunal "had worked hard to apply international law" in the trial. Shake returned to the United States in 1948. Many years later Shake remarked that he accepted the legitimacy of the tribunals, but thought an impartial tribunal from neutral countries using neutral judges would have been "preferable" in avoiding a case where "the victor" tried "the vanquished."

== Later years ==
After Shake returned to the United States from Germany in 1948, he continued to practiced law in Vincennes, Indiana, until his retirement at age eighty-eight.

Shake married Alice Killion Hubbard on January 2, 1952. They had one child, Susan. Shake's son, Gilbert, died in 1968; Alice died in 1970.

== Death and legacy ==
Shake died on September 11, 1978, at the age of ninety-one. His funeral and burial took place at Vincennes.

Shake is known for his service as an Indiana Supreme Court judge (1938–45) and as the presiding judge of the tribunal that heard the Farban case in Nuremberg, Germany, in 1947–48. Shake was also remembered for his "wisdom, wit, and warmth" and as a "masterful" orator. In addition, Shake was dedicated to serving Vincennes University, where he was once a student, as a member of the university's board of trustees from 1923 to 1966. He was also actively involved in Sigma Pi fraternity throughout his lifetime. He served on the fraternity's grand council four times between 1908 and 1964, including the fraternity's first grand council in 1908. Shake, a devotee of Abraham Lincoln, helped to establish a memorial to Lincoln along the Illinois banks of the Wabash River near Vincennes.

== Honors and tributes ==
- The 14,000 square-foot Shake Learning Resources Center, located on the Vincennes University campus, was dedicated in 1960 and named in Shake's honor. A 5,000-square-foot addition was dedicated in 1967, and a 20,000-square-foot expansion was dedicated on November 16, 1986., with another expansion in 1999 (including the addition of a second floor) and a complete renovation in 2018.
- In 1975 Shake was elected to the Indiana Academy, an organization honoring people with a Hoosier background who have won national recognition for their contributions to the state and the nation.
- Sigma Pi fraternity's Curtis G. Shake Scholarship, named in his honor, is awarded to members of his fraternity who excel in legal studies. He was awarded the fraternity's Founders' Award in 1962 and is one of only six men who have been named as an Honorary Grand Sage (President).
- Shake wrote that he had spent several evenings discussing the Nuremberg trials with Abby Mann, writer of the film Judgment at Nuremberg (1961), a fictionalized version of the Nuremberg trial of German judges. The film did not cover the Farben case. At the end of the film an aide to the presiding judge, who is portrayed by Spencer Tracy, asks if he had heard that the verdict in the Farben case had been announced.

== Selected published works ==
- A History of Vincennes University (1928)
- The Old Cathedral and Its Environs (1934)
- A Naval History of Vincennes (1936)
- Historic Vincennes (1961)
- Vincennes University: A Brief History 1801–1951 (1951)
- Vincennes, The Old Post on the Wabash: Its Place in American History (1965)
