= Frederick Simpson Deitrick =

American politician (1875–1948)

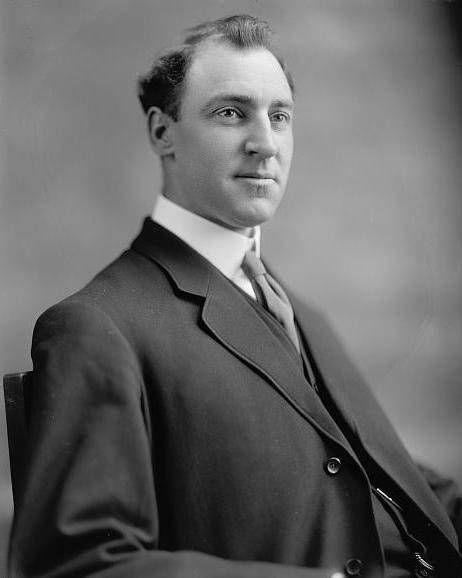

Member of the U.S. House of Representatives from Massachusetts's 8th district
- In office March 4, 1913 – March 3, 1915
- Preceded by: Samuel W. McCall
- Succeeded by: Frederick W. Dallinger

Member of the Massachusetts House of Representatives
- In office 1902-1905
- Preceded by: William H. Lewis

Personal details
- Born: April 9, 1875 New Brighton, Pennsylvania, U.S.
- Died: May 24, 1948 (aged 73) Middleton, Massachusetts, U.S.
- Party: Democratic
- Education: Harvard Law School
- Occupation: Lawyer

Frederick Simpson Deitrick (April 9, 1875 – May 24, 1948) was a U.S. representative from Massachusetts.

Born in New Brighton, Pennsylvania, Deitrick attended the public schools. He graduated from Geneva College, Beaver Falls, Pennsylvania, in 1895 and from Harvard Law School in 1898. After being admitted to the bar in 1899, Deitrick commenced practice in Boston. He served as a member of the Massachusetts House of Representatives from 1902 to 1905 and as member of the board of aldermen of Cambridge in 1908 and 1909.

Deitrick was elected as a Democrat to the Sixty-third Congress (March 4, 1913 – March 3, 1915) and after an unsuccessful candidacy for reelection in 1914, he resumed practicing law in Boston. He died in Middleton on May 24, 1948, and was interred in Cambridge at Mount Auburn Cemetery.

U.S. House of Representatives
Preceded by Samuel W. McCall	Member of the U.S. House of Representatives from Massachusetts's 8th congressional district March 4, 1913 – March 3, 1915	Succeeded by Frederick W. Dallinger
