= Lauren Robel =

Indiana University administrator and law professor

- Born: Lauren Kay Robel; 1953 (age 72–73); Omaha, Nebraska, U.S.

Academic background
- Education: Auburn University (BA); Indiana University Bloomington (JD)

Academic work
- Discipline: Law
- Sub-discipline: Constitutional law American court system
- Institutions: Indiana University Bloomington

Lauren Kay Robel (born 1953) is an American academic administrator and legal scholar working as the Val Nolan Professor of Law at the Indiana University Bloomington.

== Early life and education ==
Robel was born in Omaha, Nebraska. She earned a Bachelor of Arts degree from Auburn University in 1978 and a Juris Doctor from the Indiana University Maurer School of Law in 1983. During law school, she was elected Order of the Coif and wrote for the Indiana Law Journal.

== Career ==
From 1983 to 1985, Robel served as a law clerk for Judge Jesse E. Eschbach. Robel served as provost of Indiana University Bloomington and vice president from 2012 to 2021. Prior to her appointment, she was the dean of the Maurer School of Law from 2003 to 2011. She spearheaded a campaign to reinvigorate academic programs across the university in anticipation of the 2020 Bicentennial. These plans included a new School of Art and Design, a new program in engineering, and the integration of health sciences in a new, on-campus health center. She is also a Life Fellow of the American Bar Foundation.
