= Center Lovell, Maine =

- Village
- Location within Maine
- Coordinates: 44°10′46″N 70°53′31″W
- Country: United States
- State: Maine
- County: Oxford
- Elevation: 531 ft (162 m)
- Time zone: UTC-5 (Eastern (EST))
  - Summer (DST): UTC-4 (EDT)
- ZIP code: 04016
- Area code: 207
- GNIS feature ID: 580975

Center Lovell is an unincorporated village in the town of Lovell, Oxford County, Maine, United States. The community is located along Maine State Route 5 near the east bank of the Kezar River. Center Lovell has a post office with ZIP code 04016, which opened on May 9, 1848.
