= Jean Stoffregen =

American lawyer

- Born: Jean Elizabeth McGrew; October 14, 1919
- Died: August 21, 2008 (aged 88)
- Occupation: lawyer
- Known for: Fellowship of Reconciliation

Jean Stoffregen (October 14, 1919 – August 21, 2008) was an American lawyer who worked for racial justice as a member of the Fellowship of Reconciliation and worked at the Nuremberg trials.

== Early life and education ==
Stoffregen was born Jean Elizabeth McGrew, the first child of Glenn and Emily (Jameson) McGrew in Chicago, Illinois. She was one of two children. In 1940, she graduated Phi Beta Kappa from the Indiana University (Bloomington). She then matriculated at the University of Chicago Law School, transferred to Indiana University Law School, and graduated with a law degree in 1942.

== Career ==
Stoffregen worked for several years in private practice as an attorney, and was a member of the Indiana Association of Women Lawyers. During this time she also worked for peace and racial justice as a member of the Fellowship of Reconciliation. She worked with Bayard Rustin and other members of the Congress of Racial Equality when they visited Indiana.

In 1946, she was asked to serve as a law clerk to Frank Richman, a member of the Indiana Supreme Court, who served as one of the American judges at the second round of war crimes trials in Nuremberg, Germany. She spent nearly all of 1947 living and working in the rubble of war-torn Europe. She was one of very few women attorneys working at the Nuremberg trials in any capacity. During this period she visited displaced person camps throughout Europe, where she met with individuals seeking permission to emigrate to the United States. She photographed candidates, and collected personal stories and records that could help people to emigrate. After her return to the United States, she visited numerous churches and other organizations, working to find American citizens who would be willing to sponsor the immigration of these war refugees. Through her personal efforts dozens of refugees found sponsors, and were able to immigrate. She also was frequently asked to describe her experiences in Europe to service organizations and church groups. It was at one such speaking engagement that she met her future husband, David Miller Stoffregen of Cincinnati, Ohio. They were married in a Quaker ceremony on June 18, 1949.
