= George Henley (judge) =

American judge (1890–1965)

George Washington Henley Jr. (May 13, 1890 – February 19, 1965) was a justice of the Indiana Supreme Court for two months, from March 15, 1955, to May 23, 1955.

Born in Washington, D.C., Henley received a Bachelor of Arts from Indiana University Bloomington in 1913, followed by an LL.B. from the Indiana University School of Law in 1914. Having been admitted to the bar that year, he entered private practice and "represented a variety of corporate clients", also serving as a member of the Indiana House of Representatives from 1937 to 1947. Thereafter, he became a director of the Monon Railroad.

On February 25, 1955, Justice Frank E. Gilkison died, leaving a vacancy in the court. On March 15, 1955, Governor George N. Craig appointed Henley to the seat. Henley agreed to the appointment with the understanding that he would serve until the end of the court's term, on May 21, as he could not afford to be away from his private practice longer than that. Henley "told the press that he did not want the appointment, but he only wanted the prestige of having served". On April 14, 1955, Craig announced Henley's imminent resignation, and on May 23, 1955, Craig appointed Norman Arterburn to the seat, supplanting Henley; Arterburn would go on to serve for 22 years.

Henley died in Bloomington, Indiana, and was eulogized by Indiana University chancellor Herman B Wells, and interred in Rose Hill Cemetery.

Indiana House of Representatives
Preceded by Quincy Austin East	Member of the Indiana House of Representatives from the Monroe County district 1936–1948	Succeeded by Donald Aquilla Rogers
Political offices
Preceded by Frank E. Gilkison	Justice of the Indiana Supreme Court; 1955–1955	Succeeded by Norman Arterburn
