= Indiana Supreme Court =

Highest court in the US state of Indiana

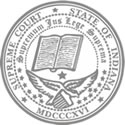
- Seal of the Supreme Court of Indiana
- Interactive map of Indiana Supreme Court
- 39°46′07.1″N 86°09′45.4″W
- Established: 1816
- Jurisdiction: Indiana; United States
- Location: Indiana Statehouse, Indianapolis, Indiana
- Coordinates: 39°46′07.1″N 86°09′45.4″W
- Motto: Latin: Supremum Jus Lege Suprema; Justice exists where the law is supreme
- Composition method: Retention election
- Authorized by: Indiana Constitution
- Appeals to: Supreme Court of the United States (for matters involving federal law or the U.S. Constitution only)
- Judge term length: 10 years
- Number of positions: 5
- Website: Official website

Chief Justice of Indiana
- Currently: Loretta Rush
- Since: August 18, 2014
- Lead position ends: August 18, 2024
- Jurist term ends: December 31, 2024

The Indiana Supreme Court, established by Article 7 of the Indiana Constitution, is the highest judicial authority in the state of Indiana. Located in Indianapolis, the court's chambers are in the north wing of the Indiana Statehouse.

In December 1816, the Indiana Supreme Court succeeded the General Court of the Indiana Territory as the state's high court. During its long history the court has heard a number of high-profile cases, including Lasselle v. State (1820). Originally begun as a three-member judicial panel, the court underwent major reforms in 1852 and 1971, as well as several other reorganizations. Court reforms led to a majority of Supreme Court cases being delegated to lower courts, an enlarged panel of justices, and employment of a large staff to assist as its caseload increases.

== Organization and jurisdiction ==
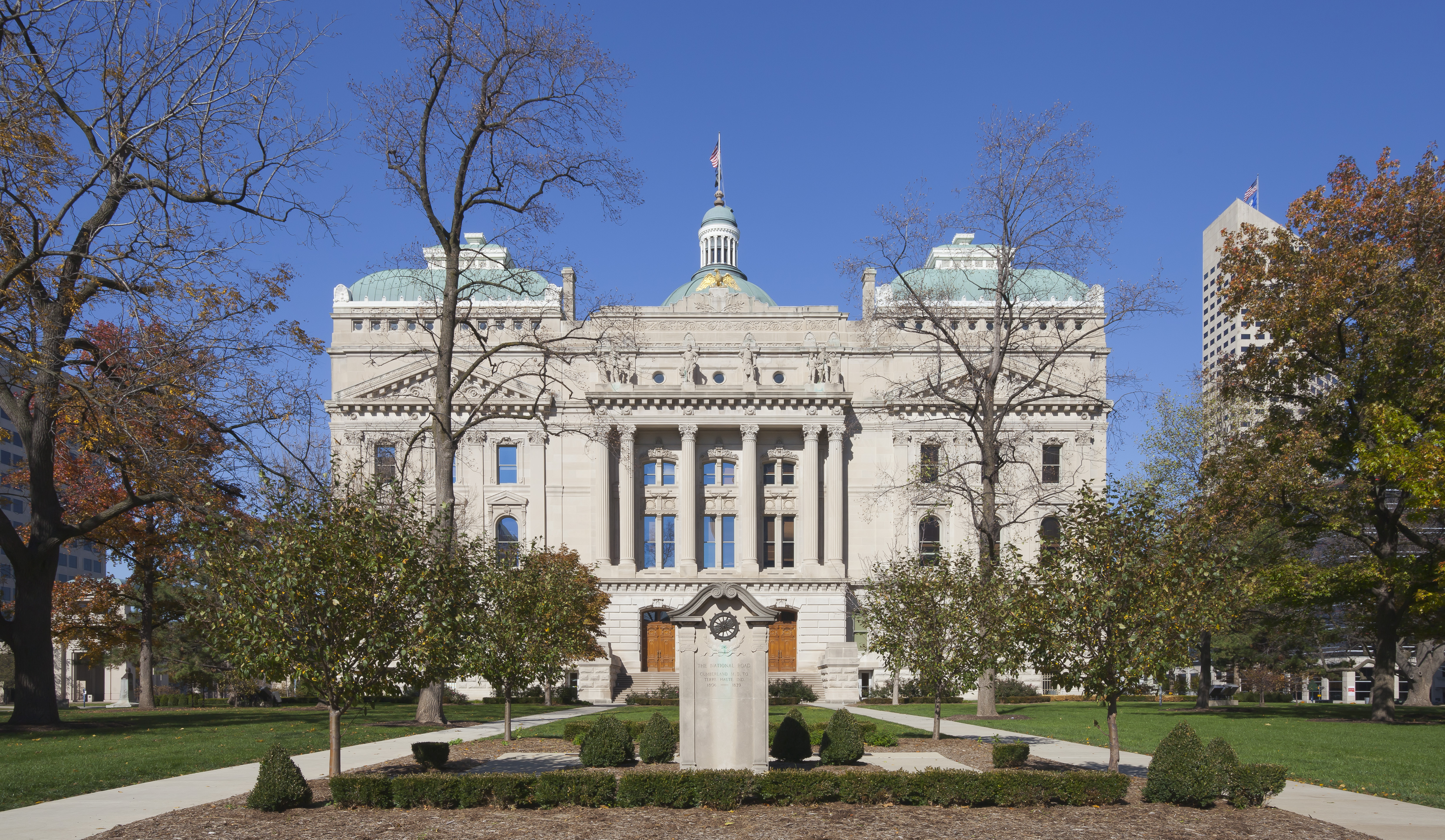
Indiana State Capitol, host of the Indiana Supreme Court.

In 2008, the Indiana Supreme Court consisted of one chief justice and four associate justices, the constitutional minimum. However, the Indiana General Assembly may increase the number of associate justices to a maximum of eight for a total of nine court justices. A board of five commissioners assists the court in its administrative duties. Commissioners are nominated by the Judicial Nominating Commission and appointed by the governor. The court offices and chambers are located on the third floor in the north wing of the Indiana Statehouse. The court maintains a large legal library on the third floor that is open to the public.

The Supreme Court has no original jurisdiction in most cases, meaning that it can only hear cases appealed to the court after having been previously heard in lower courts. Most cases begin in local circuit courts, where the initial trial is held and a jury decides the outcome of the case. The circuit court decision can be appealed to the Indiana Court of Appeals or the Indiana Tax Court, who can hear the case or enforce the lower court's decision. If the parties still disagree with the outcome of the case, they can appeal the decision to the Indiana Supreme Court. The court can choose to hear the case and possibly overturn the previous judgment, or it can decline to accept the case and uphold the decision of the lower courts.

The court has original and sole jurisdiction in certain specific areas, including the practice of law, discipline or disbarment of judges appointed to the lower state courts, and supervision over the exercise of jurisdiction by the other lower courts of the state. When the court accepts a case, it reviews the documentation of the trials in the lower court and sometimes allows oral arguments before making a decision. In some cases the justices will issue a decision without hearing arguments from either side and will base their decision solely on evidence submitted in the lower courts. The court can order a new trial to take place in the local court, overturn the decision of lower courts and enforce its own decision, or uphold the decision of lower courts.

The court appoints three commissions to assist it in its exclusive jurisdiction over the practice of law in Indiana. The role of the Board of Law Examiners is to "inquire into and determine the character, fitness, and general qualifications to be admitted to practice law as a member of the bar of the Indiana Supreme Court". The Disciplinary Commission is responsible for investigating grievances filed against members of the bar for misconduct and making disciplinary recommendations to the Supreme Court. The Commission for Continuing Legal Education administers, develops, and regulates continuing legal education requirements, mediation training standards, and attorney specialization programs.

The Judicial Nominating Commission is responsible for recruiting and interviewing applicants to fill vacancies on the Indiana Supreme Court, the Court of Appeals, and the Tax Court. It then sends three nominees for each vacancy to the governor. The Judicial Qualification Commission investigates complaints of judicial misconduct and files charges where appropriate. Both commissions have the same members and are chaired by the chief justice.

The entire court takes part in the annual Judicial Conference of Indiana, which is attended by all of the state's judges, and recommends improvements to the state judiciary. The court is also responsible for implementing all laws passed by the Indiana General Assembly that affect the judiciary. The Division of Supreme Court Administration is staffed by clerks who oversee the fiscal management of the courts, including payroll and expenses. In addition, the division is responsible for maintaining the court's records and assists in its administrative functions.

== Terms and elections ==
Article 7 of the Indiana Constitution governs the term length of Supreme Court justices. When there is a vacancy on the court, a new justice is nominated using a variation of the Missouri Plan. First, the Judicial Nominating Commission submits a list of three qualified nominees to the governor. The governor then selects the new Justice from the list. If the governor fails to choose a replacement within sixty days, the chief justice or the acting chief justice must do so. The Judicial Nomination Commission Chief Justice selects the chief justice from the sitting associate justices for a five-year term. The chief justice presides over the court. When the position of chief justice becomes vacant, the most senior member of the court serves as the acting chief justice until a new one is chosen by the Judicial Nominating Commission. The chief justice also serves as chairman of the Judicial Nominating Commission.

Justices are appointed to a term that could potentially last for ten years. Newly selected justices serve for two years before being subjected to a retention election held during the first statewide election following the completion of the justice's second year in office. The justice is listed on the ballot with the option to be retained or to be rejected from the court. If retained, the justice may serve the remainder of their ten-year term. When a term is completed, the justice must be reappointed with the same process originally used to appoint them to remain on the court. A majority vote of both houses of the Indiana General Assembly may impeach a justice for misconduct. It is mandatory for a justice to retire at age seventy-five, even if their term is incomplete.

=== Qualification ===
Eligibility requirements to be nominated as a justice of the Supreme Court are established in Article 7 of the Indiana Constitution. The candidate must be a citizen of the United States and reside within the state of Indiana before being considered for the office. The candidate must also have been admitted to the practice of law in Indiana for at least ten years prior to their candidacy or must have served as a judge of a circuit, superior, or criminal court of Indiana for five years. The candidate cannot be under an indictment in any court in the United States with a crime punishable as a felony. The Judicial Nominating Commission must also ensure that they are the "most highly qualified public candidates" available.

== Current justices ==
Name	Born	Start	Chief term	Term ends (Note: Term ends Dec. 31 of the year listed.)	Mandatory retirement	Appointer	Law school
Loretta Rush, Chief Justice	May 11, 1958 (age 68)	November 7, 2012	2014–present	2034	2033	Mitch Daniels (R)	Indiana
Mark Massa	March 6, 1961 (age 65)	April 2, 2012	–	2034	2036	Mitch Daniels (R)	IU-Indianapolis
Geoffrey G. Slaughter	November 1, 1962 (age 63)	June 13, 2016	–	2028	2037	Mike Pence (R)	Indiana
Christopher M. Goff	1972 (age 53–54)	July 24, 2017	–	2030	2047	Eric Holcomb (R)	Indiana
Derek R. Molter	February 16, 1982 (age 44)	September 1, 2022	–	2034	2057	Eric Holcomb (R)	Indiana

== History ==
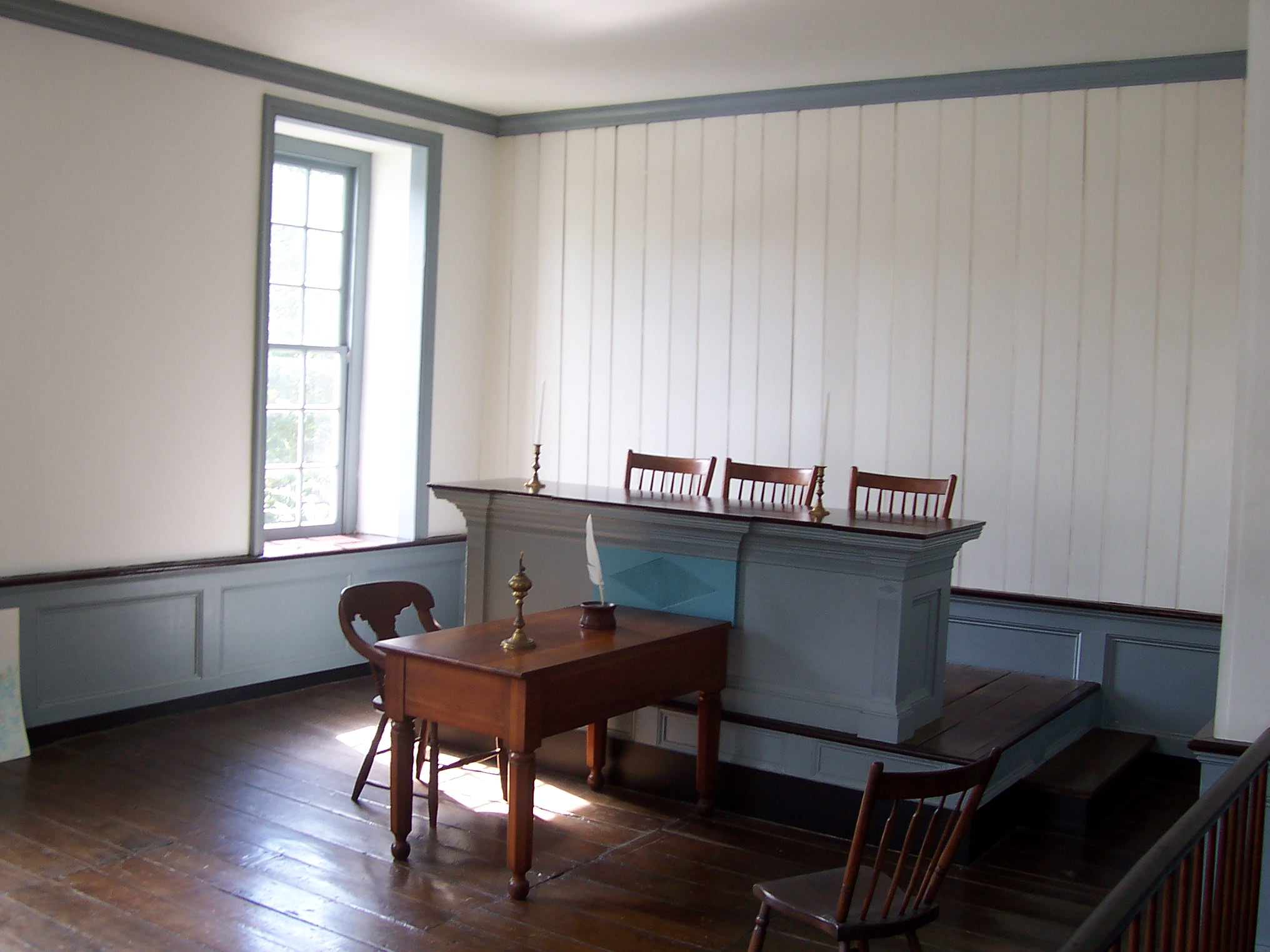
First Supreme Court chambers in the First State Capitol Building

The Indiana Supreme Court was established in 1816 when Indiana was granted statehood. The new Court replaced the General Court of the Indiana Territory, which consisted of a three-member panel. Housed in a three-room building it shared with the Indiana legislature, the court held its first session in Corydon on May 5, 1817. Under the state constitution of 1816, the governor appointed justices with the state senate's "advice and consent" for a term of seven years.

In December 1816, Jonathan Jennings, Indiana's first governor, nominated John Johnson of Vincennes in Knox County; James Scott of Charlestown in Clark County; and Jesse Holman of Aurora in Dearborn County, to serve as the first panel of judges on the Indiana Supreme Court. Johnson became the court's first chief justice. When Johnson died in 1817, Jennings named Isaac Blackford to replace him. Blackford became the second chief justice of the court and was the longest serving justice in the court's history, serving 36 years, 3 months, and 24 days. Blackford recorded all of the court's early decisions in a multivolume work titled Blackford's Reports that served for many years as a foundational text on the interpretation of state laws.

In 1824, the Supreme Court relocated to Indianapolis with the rest of the state's government. Initially the court shared space on the second floor of the Marion County Courthouse, before moving to the third Indiana Statehouse. In 1865 the court was given its own building on lot number one in Indianapolis, where it remained until 1888, moving to its present location in the fifth Indiana Statehouse. As of 2012, the court occupies the entire north wing of the third floor of the Indiana Statehouse.

In the early history of the state, the court relied heavily on English common law for precedence. This continued to be the case until the passage of the Practice Act in the late 1840s which changed the system for pleadings and caused many earlier precedents to become invalid.

In 1851, the Supreme Court was reorganized under the new state constitution. The position of justice was changed from an appointed position to an elected one. Judicial terms were changed to six years and the court's size was set to a minimum of three members and not more than five. The court's judges quickly became overwhelmed by an ever-increasing caseload. In 1853, the minimum was increased to four members and in 1872, it was increased to five. The court has remained at a minimum of five justices since that time. In 1867, the general assembly transferred all the law books in the Indiana State Library to the court to create a Supreme Court Law Library. The library grew to become the primary legal library for the state and includes more than seventy-thousand volumes.

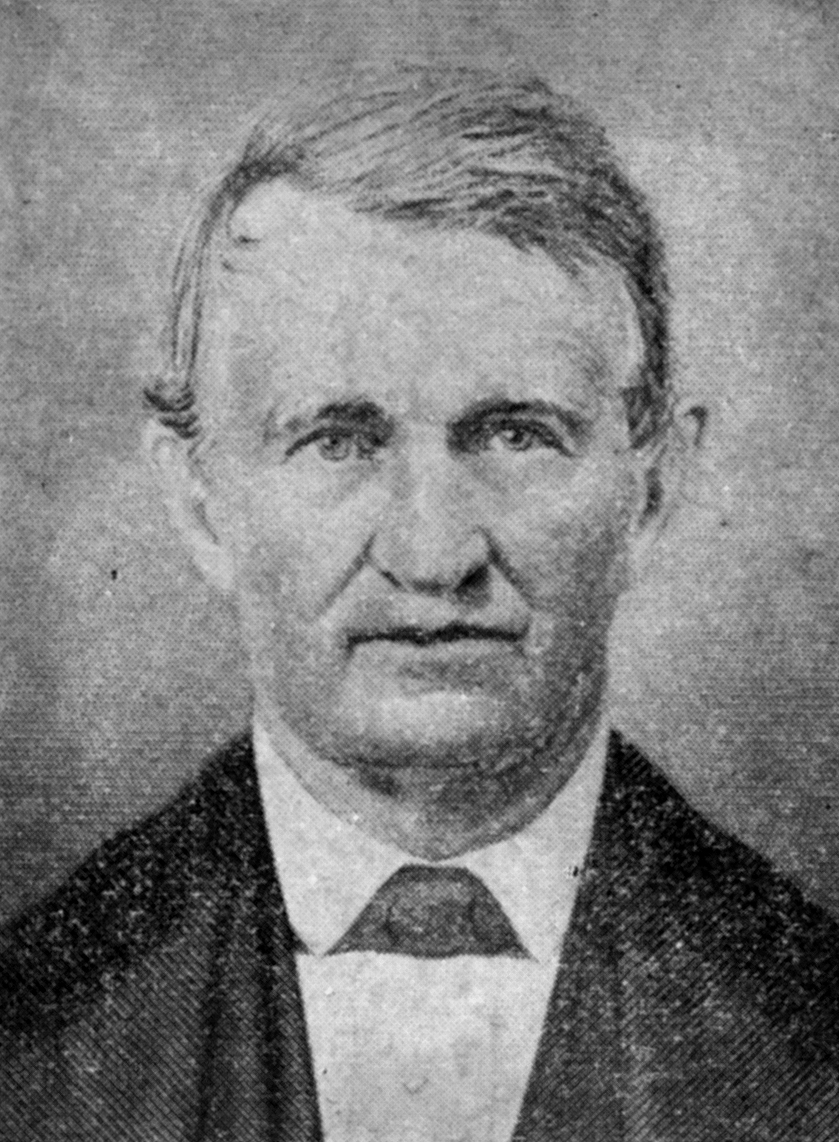
Chief Justice Isaac Blackford (November 6, 1786 – December 31, 1859)

The court's caseload continued to grow over time. In 1881, the general assembly approved the creation of a five-member panel of commissioners to assist the justices in administrative tasks. Even this was not enough to handle the load. In 1891, the Appellate Court of Indiana was created to handle cases of lower importance. At first the appellate court only took a small portion of the Supreme Court's caseload, but its responsibility gradually increased.

In 1970, state constitutional amendments reorganized the court. The constitution renamed the Appellate Court the Indiana Court of Appeals. With the formation of the Court of Appeals, the Supreme Court could choose which cases it would hear and which cases it would leave to the lower courts. Constitutional amendments also lengthened judicial terms to ten years and changed the limits on the size of the court to a minimum of five members and a maximum of nine. The method of selecting justices was changed from statewide election to appointment by the governor. The amendment also provided for a Judicial Nominating Commission to choose candidates. Justices also became subject to a retention election. In addition, the office of chief justice became permanent. Previously the title rotated among the justices. In 2004, the Indiana General Assembly created the Supreme Court Division of Administration, legalizing and expanding the role of the clerks of the court.

=== Landmark cases ===
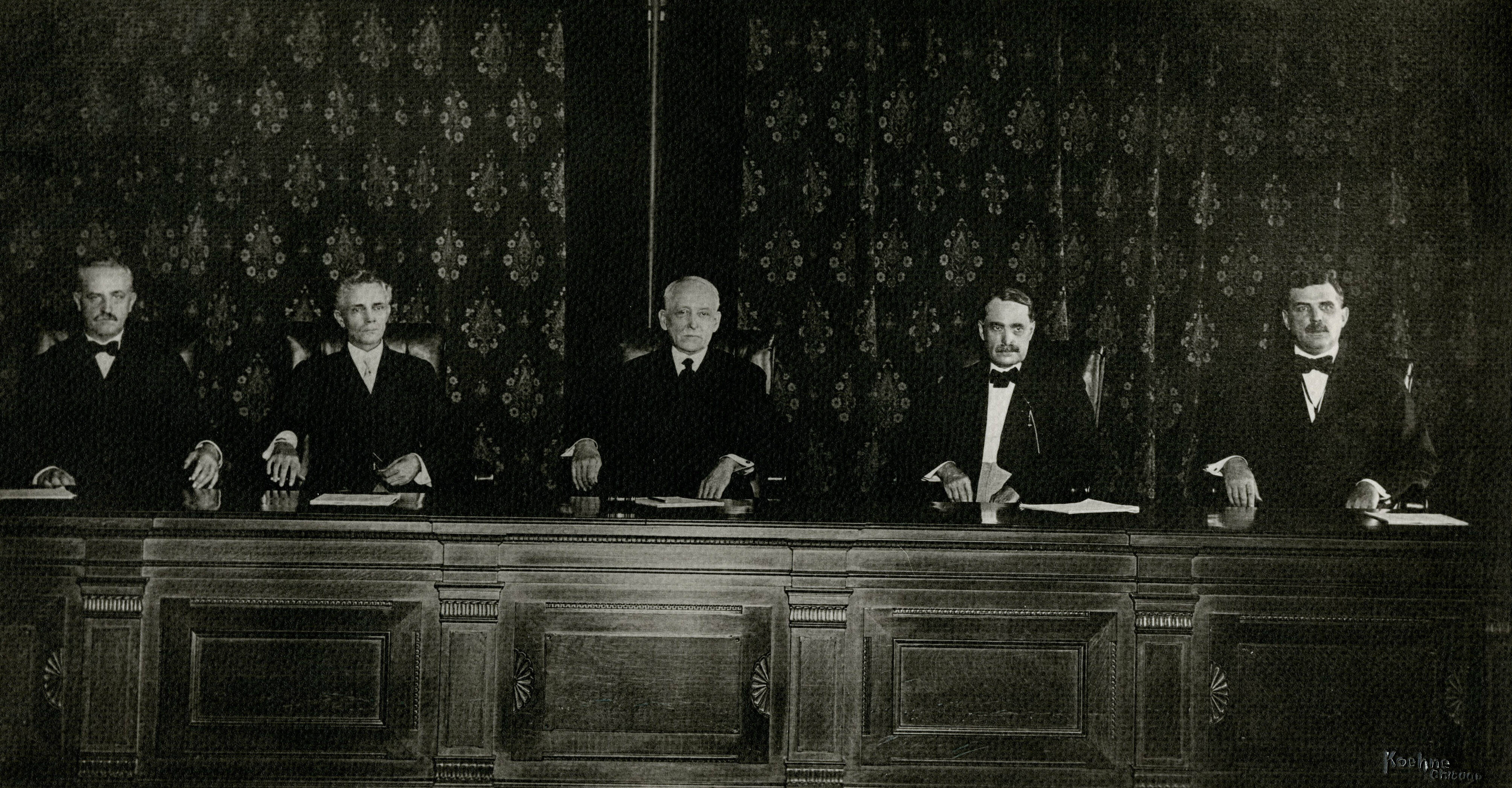
Portrait of the Indiana Supreme Court in their chambers in 1912. From left to right: Douglas Morris, Charles E. Cox, Chief Justice Leander J. Monks, Quincy Myers, and John W. Spencer.

The court has heard several cases that have had a major impact on Indiana as well as others that have set nationwide precedents. The first of these cases, Lasselle v. State (1820), where the court overturned a circuit court decision that tested slave ownership in the new state by stating "the framers of our constitution intended a total and entire prohibition of slavery," and resulted in all slaves in Indiana being freed. In the Fall Creek Massacre case (1823), State v. Hudson, the court upheld a lower court's finding that crimes committed against Native Americans were punishable under American laws. This decision lead to the first execution of a white man for crimes against natives. In the Falkenburg v. Jones case (1854), Indiana became the first state to establish the right for a defendant to obtain court records free of charge. The 1909 case of Woessner v. Bullick established that the court could invalidate a governor's veto if proper veto procedures were not followed, in effect ruling the pocket-veto as unconstitutional. In 1917, the state was among the first to adopt an Exclusionary rule, established in the case of Callendar v. State, which prevented illegally obtained evidence from be submitted in court. In Williams v. Smith, a case heard in 1921, the court overturned Indiana's eugenics laws, the first of their kind in the nation.

== See also ==
- Indiana Court of Appeals
- Constitution of Indiana
- Government of Indiana
- Courts of Indiana

== Bibliography ==
- Alexander, D.S. (1881). The Southern Law Review. Vol. VI. St. Louis: G.I. Jones and Company.
- Dunn, Jacob Piatt Jr. (1919). Indiana and Indianans. 5 vols. Chicago: American Historical Society.
- Funk, Arville L. (1983). A Sketchbook of Indiana History. Rochester, Indiana: Christian Book Press.
- Gugin, Linda C.; James E. St. Clair, eds. (2010). Justices of the Indiana Supreme Court. Indianapolis: Indiana Historical Society Press. ISBN 9780871952882. WorldCat
- Here is Your Indiana Government. Indianapolis: Indiana Chamber of Commerce. 2005. (A new edition is published biennially.)
- Shepard, Randall T. "Slave Cases and the Indiana Supreme Court." Traces of Indiana and Midwestern History. Summer 2003. p. 34–41.
