= William Barberie Howell =

United States Judge

Chief Justice of the United States Customs Court
- In office 1926–1927
- Preceded by: Office established
- Succeeded by: Israel F. Fischer

Associate Justice of the United States Customs Court
- In office May 28, 1926 – April 4, 1927
- Appointed by: operation of law
- Preceded by: Seat established by 44 Stat. 669
- Succeeded by: William Josiah Tilson

President of the Board of General Appraisers
- In office 1925–1926
- Preceded by: Jerry Bartholomew Sullivan
- Succeeded by: Office abolished

Member of the Board of General Appraisers
- In office February 24, 1899 – May 28, 1926
- Appointed by: William McKinley
- Preceded by: George H. Sharpe
- Succeeded by: Seat abolished

Personal details
- Born: William Barberie Howell; July 5, 1865 Freehold Township, New Jersey, U.S.
- Died: April 4, 1927 (aged 61)
- Education: Spencerian Business College; George Washington University Law School (LL.B., LL.M.)

William Barberie Howell (July 5, 1865 – April 4, 1927) was an Associate Justice and Chief Justice of the United States Customs Court and previously was a member and President of the Board of General Appraisers.

== Education and career ==
Born on July 5, 1865, in Freehold Township, New Jersey, Howell attended the Spencerian Business College in 1882. He received a Bachelor of Laws in 1889 from Columbian University School of Law (now George Washington University Law School) and received a Master of Laws in 1890 from the same institution. He served as a clerk and private secretary with the United States Department of the Treasury in Washington, D.C. from 1882 to 1897. He serve as an assistant secretary of the Treasury in Washington, D.C. from 1897 to 1899.

== Federal judicial service ==
Howell was nominated by President William McKinley on February 8, 1899, to a seat on the Board of General Appraisers vacated by member George H. Sharpe. He was confirmed by the United States Senate on February 20, 1899, and received his commission on February 24, 1899. He served as president from 1925 to 1926. Howell was reassigned by operation of law to the United States Customs Court on May 28, 1926, to a new Associate Justice seat authorized by 44 Stat. 669. He served as Chief Justice from 1926 to 1927. His service terminated on April 4, 1927, due to his death. He was succeeded by Associate Justice William Josiah Tilson.

== Sources ==
Legal offices
Preceded by George H. Sharpe	Member of the Board of General Appraisers; 1899–1926	Succeeded by Seat abolished
Preceded by Jerry Bartholomew Sullivan	President of the Board of General Appraisers; 1925–1926	Succeeded by Office abolished
Preceded by Seat established by 44 Stat. 669	Associate Justice of the United States Customs Court; 1926–1927	Succeeded by William Josiah Tilson
Preceded by Office established	Chief Justice of the United States Customs Court; 1926–1927	Succeeded by Israel F. Fischer
