= Genevieve R. Cline =

American judge

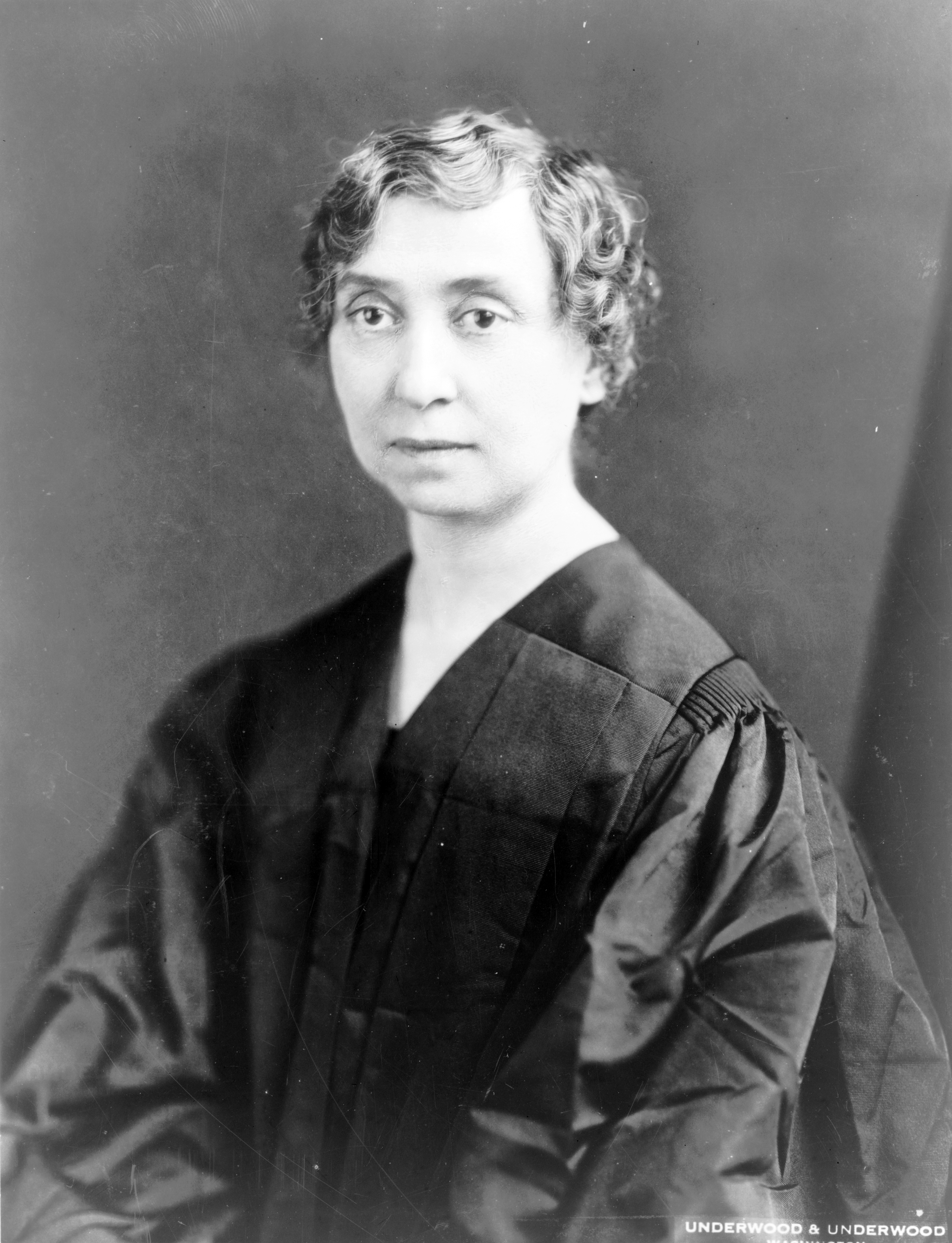

Judge of the United States Customs Court
- In office May 26, 1928 – March 1, 1953
- Appointed by: Calvin Coolidge
- Preceded by: William C. Adamson
- Succeeded by: Mary H. Donlon

Personal details
- Born: Genevieve Rose Cline; July 27, 1877 Warren, Ohio
- Died: October 25, 1959 (aged 82) Cleveland, Ohio
- Education: Baldwin Wallace College (LL.B.)

Genevieve Rose Cline (July 27, 1877 – October 25, 1959) was a judge of the United States Customs Court (now the Court of International Trade) and the first woman to serve in the United States federal judiciary, serving as an Article I federal judge.

== Education and career ==
Born on July 27, 1877, in Warren, Ohio, Cline was the daughter of Edward B. Cline and Mary A. (Fee) Cline. She graduated from Warren High School and attended Cleveland's Spencerian Business College. She later attended Oberlin College, then transferred to Baldwin Wallace College, from which she graduated with a Bachelor of Laws (LL.B.) degree in 1921.

During the 1910s, Cline served as President of the Cleveland Federation of Women's Clubs for six years, and was Chairman of the Ohio Federation of Women's Clubs for two years. She entered private practice in Cleveland, Ohio from 1921 to 1928. She was an appraiser of merchandise for the United States Department of the Treasury in Cleveland from 1922 to 1928, becoming the first women to hold such a post.

== Federal judicial service ==
Urged by the executive committee of the National Association of Women Lawyers (where Cline was Vice President for Ohio) other Ohio Republicans, President Calvin Coolidge nominated her to an Associate Justice seat on May 4, 1928. (Judge from June 17, 1930) on the United States Customs Court vacated by Associate Justice William C. Adamson. She was confirmed by the United States Senate on May 25, 1928, and received her commission on May 26, 1928. She took her oath of office in the Cleveland Federal Building on June 5, 1928, becoming the first American woman ever appointed to the federal bench, serving as an Article I federal judge. Cline retired on March 1, 1953, when she was 75 and was succeeded by Judge Mary H. Donlon.

== Death ==
Cline died of bronchopneumonia on October 25, 1959, in Cleveland, at the age of 82.

== Painting ==
A painting of Cline is included in a group mural at the Student Services area of Cleveland-Marshall College of Law.

== Bibliography ==
- "Erie County Federation." Sandusky (OH) Star-Journal, June 22, 1921, p. 4.
- "Genevieve Cline Opposed for Customs Judge." Portsmouth (OH) Daily Times, May 16, 1928, p. 5.
- Norma H. Goodhue. "No Gender in Law, Says Woman Judge." Los Angeles Times, April 17, 1949, p. C1.
- "Legal Profession." San Antonio (TX) Light, March 12, 1933, p. 27.
- Kathleen McLaughlin. "Senior Woman Federal Judge Authority on Customs Cases." New York Times, January 28, 1940, p. D6.
- "Mme. Walska Wins Fight for Rights of Wives." New York Times, January 17, 1930, p. 1.
- "Ocean Travelers." New York Times, December 20, 1940, p. 31.
- "Ohio Federation of Women's Clubs." Sandusky (OH) Star-Journal, May 8, 1920, p. 8.
- Patricia Rood. "Important Legislation." Sandusky (OH) Star-Journal, March 3, 1917, p. 5.
- Patricia Rood. "The Northeast District Meetings." Sandusky (OH) Star-Journal, February 24, 1917, p. 8.
- "What Ohio Club Women Are Doing." Newark (OH) Daily Advocate, December 9, 1916, p. 5.
- "Woman Federal Judge to Hear Walska Women's Rights Case." New York Times, October 31, 1928, p. 7.
- "Woman Takes Oath as Customs Judge." New York Times, June 7, 1928, p. 28.
- "Women Leaders Will Speak Here." Sandusky (OH) Star-Journal, April 12, 1920, p. 8.

== Sources ==
Legal offices
Preceded by William C. Adamson	Judge of the United States Customs Court; 1928–1953	Succeeded by Mary H. Donlon
