= Susan Henshaw Jones =

American museum director

Susan Henshaw Jones was the Director of the Museum of the City of New York from February 2003 and retired on December 2015.

== Career ==
Jones headed the New York Landmarks Conservancy from 1975 to 1980 and from 1990 to 1993. She was head of the National Building Museum in Washington, D.C. in 1994 until 2003. From 2003 through 2015 she was Director of the Museum of the City of New York.

According to Robert A.M. Stern, Dean of the Yale School of Architecture, Jones built the fledgling National Building Museum into a "major institution."

Jones is credited with bringing the museum to financial stability, greatly increasing the budget, thoroughly renovating and modernizing the building, updating the exhibits, staging temporary exhibitions and programs that draw public attention, and greatly increasing visitor numbers.

== Personal life ==
Jones is the daughter of Walter H. Jones, and she is married to judge Richard K. Eaton. Landscape architect Raymond Jungles designed the pool and garden of the couple's vacation home in Key West.

Jones earned her B.A. in English Literature from Vassar College and later completed her MBA at Columbia University's Graduate School of Business. She is married to federal judge Richard K. Eaton, and together they have two daughters, Alice and Liza Eaton.
