= Bernard Newman (judge) =

American judge

Senior Judge of the United States Court of International Trade
- In office December 31, 1983 – April 22, 1999

Judge of the United States Court of International Trade
- In office November 1, 1980 – December 31, 1983
- Appointed by: operation of law
- Preceded by: Seat established by 94 Stat. 1727
- Succeeded by: Dominick L. DiCarlo

Judge of the United States Customs Court
- In office June 24, 1968 – November 1, 1980
- Appointed by: Lyndon B. Johnson
- Preceded by: Mary H. Donlon
- Succeeded by: Seat abolished

Chairman of the Manhattan Republican Party
- In office 1958–1962

Personal details
- Born: Bernard Newman; October 28, 1907 New York City, New York, U.S.
- Died: April 22, 1999 (aged 91) New York City, New York, U.S.
- Education: New York University (BS); New York University School of Law (LLB)

Bernard Newman (October 28, 1907 – April 22, 1999) was a judge of the United States Court of International Trade.

== Early life and education ==
Newman was born October 28, 1907, in New York City, New York, at the same address as Louis Lefkowitz, the later New York State Attorney General, who would become his friend. He received his Bachelor of Science degree in 1928 from New York University Washington Square College. He received his Bachelor of Laws in 1929 from New York University School of Law. He married fellow student Kathryn Bereano.

== Career ==
After entering the bar in 1930, he started the law partnership Newman & Newman where he worked until 1936. He was a corporation counsel for New York City from 1936 to 1942. He was a law secretary to Justice Samuel H. Hofstadter at the New York Court of Appeals from 1942 to 1948, a time when he befriended Carmine DeSapio, the later Secretary of State of New York. He served as an official referee of the Appellate Division of the New York State Supreme Court from 1948 to 1962. In 1958 he became the New York County Republican chairman. After the party structure in Manhattan was rearranged in 1961, he became a judge at the family court in 1962, and he was appointed later to the State Supreme Court. He again served in private practice in New York City from 1963 to 1965. He served as a hearing office to both the New York State Labor Relations Board and New York State Mediation Board from 1963 to 1965. He served as a Judge for the Family Court of the State of New York from 1966 to 1968.

== Federal judicial service ==
Newman was nominated by President Lyndon B. Johnson on May 29, 1968, to a seat on the United States Customs Court vacated by Judge Mary H. Donlon. He was confirmed by the United States Senate on June 24, 1968, and received his commission on June 24, 1968. He was reassigned by operation of law to the United States Court of International Trade on November 1, 1980, to a new seat authorized by 94 Stat. 1727. He assumed senior status on December 31, 1983. His service terminated on April 22, 1999, due to his death in New York City.

== Sources ==
Legal offices
Preceded by Mary H. Donlon	Judge of the United States Customs Court; 1968–1980	Succeeded by Seat abolished
Preceded by Seat established by 94 Stat. 1727	Judge of the United States Court of International Trade; 1980–1983	Succeeded by Dominick L. DiCarlo
