= Timothy M. Reif =

American judge (born 1959)

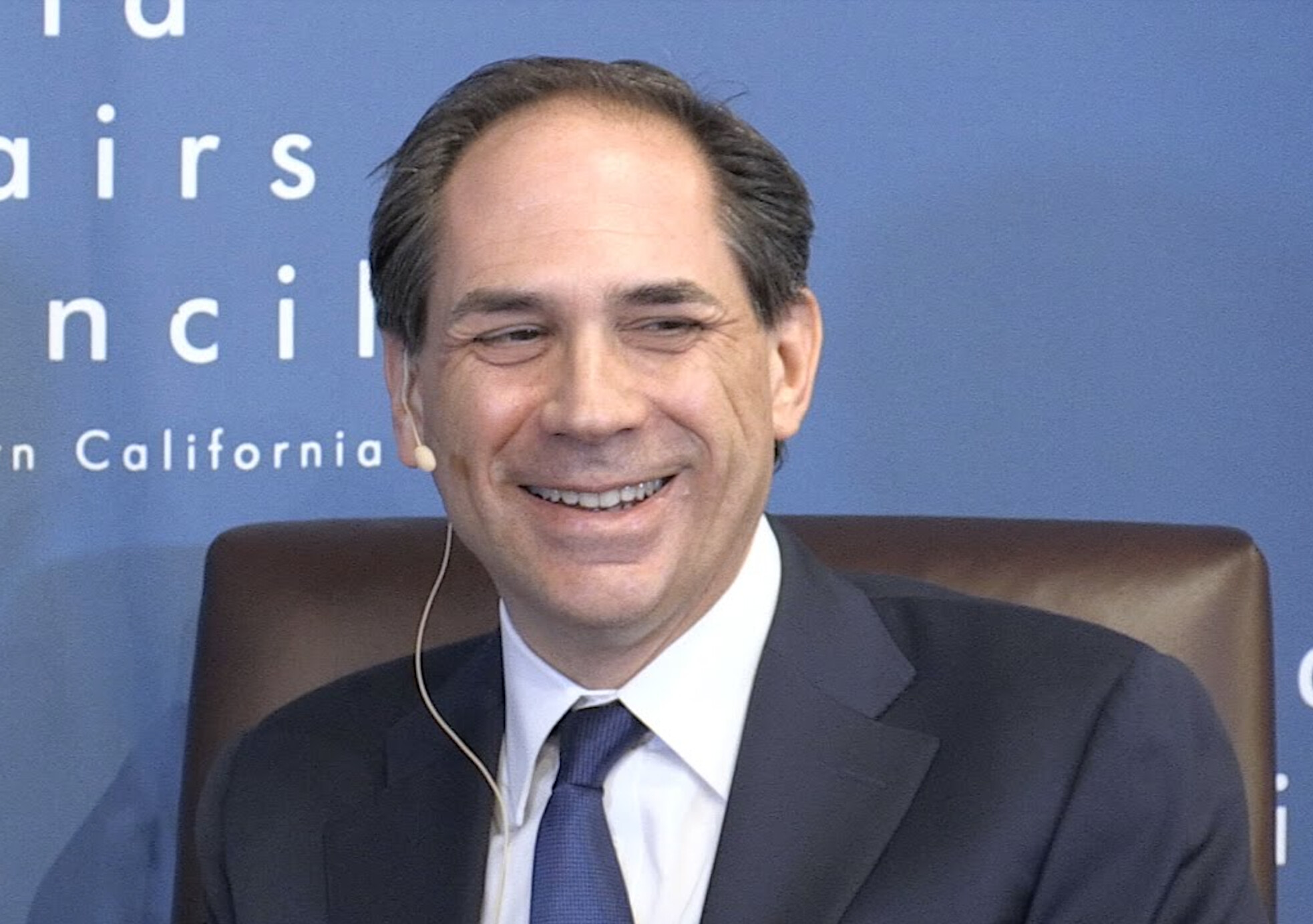

Judge of the United States Court of International Trade
- Incumbent
- Assumed office August 8, 2019
- Appointed by: Donald Trump
- Preceded by: Richard K. Eaton

Personal details
- Born: April 12, 1959 (age 66) New York City, New York, U.S.
- Party: Democratic
- Education: Princeton University (BA, MPA); Columbia University (JD)

Timothy Mark Reif (born April 12, 1959) is a United States judge of the United States Court of International Trade.

== Education ==
Reif earned his Bachelor of Arts and Master of Public Administration from Princeton University, where he was named a Fulbright Scholar, and his Juris Doctor from Columbia Law School, where he was a Harlan Fiske Stone Scholar.

== Legal career ==
Upon graduating from law school, Reif worked as an associate at Milbank Tweed Hadley & McCloy for two years. From 1987 to 1989, he served as an attorney-advisor with the United States International Trade Commission. Reif worked as an assistant and associate counsel in the Office of the United States Trade Representative from 1989 to 1993. He was trade counsel to the United States House Committee on Ways and Means from 1993 to 1994 and later spent a decade as Chief International Trade Counsel to the committee. Between his stints on congressional staffs, Reif worked as Special International Trade Counsel at Dewey Ballantine, LLP. From 2009 to 2017, he served as General Counsel of the Office of the United States Trade Representative. From 2017 to 2017, Reif served as a senior advisor to the United States Trade Representative. Since 2014 he has been a Visiting Professor of Law at Columbia Law School. He has also taught at the Woodrow Wilson School of Public and International Affairs and the Georgetown University Law Center.

== Trade Court service ==
On June 7, 2018, President Trump announced his intent to nominate Reif to serve as a United States judge of the United States Court of International Trade. On June 18, 2018, his nomination was sent to the Senate. President Trump nominated Reif to the seat vacated by Judge Richard K. Eaton, who assumed senior status on August 22, 2014. On November 28, 2018, a hearing on his nomination was held before the Senate Judiciary Committee. On January 3, 2019, his nomination was returned to the President under Rule XXXI, Paragraph 6 of the United States Senate. On January 23, 2019, President Trump announced his intent to renominate Reif for a federal judgeship. His nomination was sent to the Senate later that day. On February 7, 2019, his nomination was reported out of committee by a voice vote. On August 1, 2019, his nomination was confirmed by a voice vote. He received his judicial commission on August 8, 2019.

Legal offices
| Preceded by Richard K. Eaton | Judge of the United States Court of International Trade; 2019–present | Incumbent |
