= Jed Johnson (Oklahoma politician) =

American politician and jurist (1888-1963)

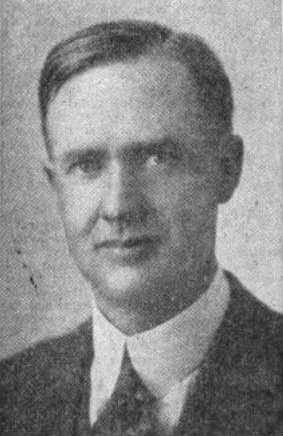
- Johnson as an Oklahoma State Senator, 1921

Judge of the United States Customs Court
- In office June 25, 1947 – May 8, 1963
- Appointed by: Harry S. Truman
- Preceded by: William John Keefe
- Succeeded by: James Lopez Watson

Member of the U.S. House of Representatives from Oklahoma's 6th district
- In office March 4, 1927 – January 3, 1947
- Preceded by: Elmer Thomas
- Succeeded by: Toby Morris

Member of the Oklahoma Senate from the 17th district
- In office 1924–1928
- Preceded by: L. L. West
- Succeeded by: Harry Jolly
- In office 1920–1922
- Preceded by: Elmer Thomas
- Succeeded by: L. L. West

Personal details
- Born: Jed Joseph Johnson; July 31, 1888 Ellis County, Texas, U.S.
- Died: May 8, 1963 (aged 74) New York City, New York, U.S.
- Resting place: Rose Hill Cemetery; Chickasha, Oklahoma; 35°1′54″N 97°56′45″W
- Party: Democratic
- Spouse: Beatrice Luginbyhl
- Children: 4, including Jed Jr.
- Education: University of Oklahoma (LLB)

Jed Joseph Johnson, Sr. (July 31, 1888 – May 8, 1963) was an American attorney, politician, and jurist who served as a United States representative from Oklahoma and a judge of the United States Customs Court.

== Early life and education ==
Born on July 31, 1888, on a farm near Waxahachie, Ellis County, Texas, Johnson attended the public schools in Texas and Oklahoma and then received a Bachelor of Laws in 1915 from the University of Oklahoma College of Law and participated in postgraduate work at the University of Clermont in Clermont-Ferrand, France.

== Career ==
He was admitted to the bar in 1918 and entered private practice in Walters, Oklahoma. He served in the United States Army as a private from 1918 to 1919 in World War I in Company L of the 36th Division. He returned to private practice in Chickasha, Oklahoma from 1919 to 1927. He was a newspaper editor in Cotton County, Oklahoma from 1920 to 1922.

He was a member of the Oklahoma Senate from 1920 to 1927. He served as a delegate to the annual peace conference of the Interparliamentary Union at Paris, France, in 1927 and 1937, and at Geneva, Switzerland, in 1929, and was Chairman of the Speakers' Bureau for the Democratic Congressional Campaign Committee.

Johnson was elected as a Democrat to the 70th United States Congress and to the nine succeeding Congresses, serving from March 4, 1927, to January 3, 1947. He was an unsuccessful candidate for renomination in 1946.

=== Federal judicial service ===
Johnson was nominated to the United States Customs Court by President Franklin D. Roosevelt on March 29, 1945. He was confirmed by the United States Senate on April 3, 1945. However, he declined the appointment.

Johnson was nominated by President Harry S. Truman on April 7, 1947, to a seat on the United States Customs Court vacated by Judge William John Keefe. He was confirmed by the United States Senate on June 23, 1947, and received his commission on June 25, 1947. Johnson was initially appointed as a Judge under Article I, but the court was raised to Article III status by operation of law on July 14, 1956, and Johnson thereafter served as an Article III Judge. His service terminated on May 8, 1963, due to his death.

== Personal life ==
Johnson died in a New York City, New York hospital on May 8, 1963. Johnson was buried at Rose Hill Cemetery in Chickasha, Oklahoma. Jed Johnson Lake in the Wichita Mountains National Wildlife Refuge is named in honor of Johnson. His son, Jed Johnson Jr., served one term in Congress.

== Sources ==
- "Jed Johnson". Biographical Directory of the United States Congress.

U.S. House of Representatives
Preceded by Elmer Thomas	Member of the U.S. House of Representatives from Oklahoma's 6th congressional district 1927–1947	Succeeded by Toby Morris
Preceded by William John Keefe	Judge of the United States Customs Court; 1947–1963	Succeeded by James Lopez Watson
