= Ferdinand N. Shurtleff =

American judge

Member of the Board of General Appraisers
- In office July 22, 1890 – May 12, 1899
- Appointed by: Benjamin Harrison
- Preceded by: Seat established by 26 Stat. 131
- Succeeded by: Israel F. Fischer

Personal details
- Born: Ferdinand N. Shurtleff; April 4, 1837 Hartland, New York, U.S.
- Died: April 6, 1903 (aged 66) Portland, Oregon, U.S.

Ferdinand N. Shurtleff (April 4, 1837 – April 6, 1903) was a Member of the Board of General Appraisers.

== Education and career ==
Shurtleff was born April 4, 1837, in Hartland, New York. He entered private practice in Portland, Oregon. He served as commissary for the Grande Ronde Indian Reservation in Oregon from 1864 to 1869. He served as deputy collector of customs and customs collector in Portland from 1870 to 1880. He served as Superior Officer for the collector of customs in Portland from 1880 to 1890.

== Federal judicial service ==
Shurtleff was nominated by President Benjamin Harrison on July 17, 1890, to the Board of General Appraisers, to a new seat created by 26 Stat. 131. He was confirmed by the United States Senate on July 18, 1890, and received his commission on July 22, 1890. His service terminated on May 12, 1899, due to his removal from office by President William McKinley. He was succeeded on the board by Israel F. Fischer.

=== Circumstances of his removal from office ===
In early 1899, Shurtleff received a request from the Treasury Department to resign from the Board, but declined to do so. It is believed partisan political pressure was behind the request. On May 3, 1899, President McKinley wrote Shurtleff, informing him that he was being removed from office, effective upon the appointment and qualification of his successor, which occurred on May 12, 1899. McKinley gave no cause for Shurtleff's removal and Shurtleff was not given the opportunity to defend himself before a commission. Shurtleff challenged his dismissal as unlawful in the Court of Claims which ruled against him, upon which he appealed to the United States Supreme Court. In the case Shurtleff vs. United States the Supreme Court ruled that barring a specific prohibition in the statute creating an office, the President of the United States may remove any officer without cause, thus denying Shurtleff's petition.

== Death ==
Shurtleff died on April 6, 1903, in Portland, Oregon, ironically on the very day on which Shurtleff vs. United States was decided by the Supreme Court.

== Sources ==
- "Board of General Appraisers: Shurtleff, Ferdinand N. - Federal Judicial Center". www.fjc.gov.

Legal offices
| Preceded by Seat established by 26 Stat. 131 | Member of the Board of General Appraisers; 1890–1899 | Succeeded by Israel F. Fischer |
