= William John Keefe =

American judge (1873–1955)

Judge of the United States Customs Court
- In office June 13, 1933 – January 15, 1947
- Appointed by: Franklin D. Roosevelt
- Preceded by: George M. Young
- Succeeded by: Jed Johnson

Personal details
- Born: William John Keefe; November 17, 1873 Clinton, Iowa
- Died: September 14, 1955 (aged 81) Bronxville, New York
- Education: University of Iowa College of Law (LL.B.)

William John Keefe (November 17, 1873 – September 14, 1955) was a judge of the United States Customs Court.

== Biography ==
Born on November 17, 1873, in Clinton, Iowa, Keefe received a Bachelor of Laws in 1894 from the University of Iowa College of Law. He worked in private practice in Clinton from 1895 to 1902 and again from 1910 to 1933. He served as county attorney for Clinton County, Iowa from 1902 to 1910.

== Federal Judicial Service ==
Keefe was nominated by President Franklin D. Roosevelt on June 8, 1933, to a seat on the United States Customs Court vacated by Judge George M. Young. He was confirmed by the United States Senate on June 10, 1933, and received his commission on June 13, 1933. His service terminated on January 15, 1947, due to his retirement.

== Death ==
Keefe died on September 14, 1955, in Bronxville, New York.

== Sources ==
Legal offices
Preceded by George M. Young	Judge of the United States Customs Court; 1933–1947	Succeeded by Jed Johnson
