= Donald C. Pogue =

American judge (1947–2016)

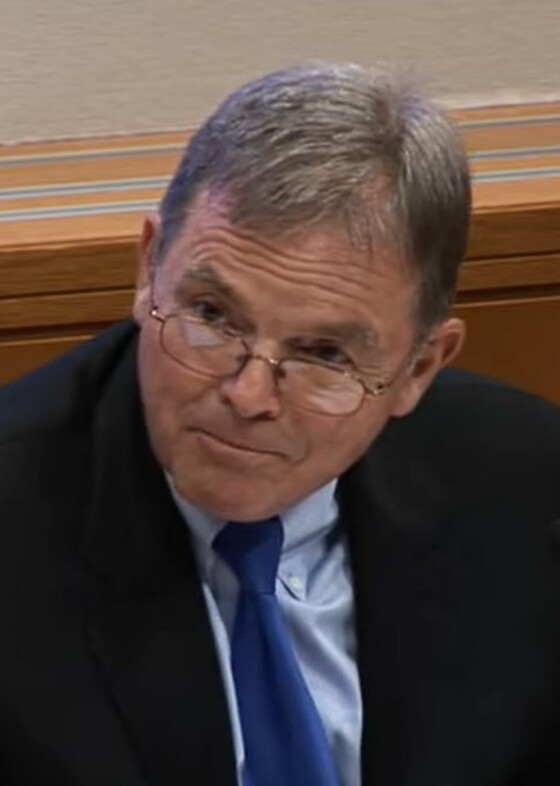
- Pogue in 2015

Senior Judge of the United States Court of International Trade
- In office July 1, 2014 – October 26, 2016

Chief Judge of the United States Court of International Trade
- In office November 1, 2010 – July 1, 2014
- Preceded by: Jane A. Restani
- Succeeded by: Timothy C. Stanceu

Judge of the United States Court of International Trade
- In office August 14, 1995 – July 1, 2014
- Appointed by: Bill Clinton
- Preceded by: James Lopez Watson
- Succeeded by: M. Miller Baker

Personal details
- Born: Donald Carl Pogue; May 24, 1947 Macomb, Illinois, U.S.
- Died: October 26, 2016 (aged 69) New York City, New York, U.S.
- Education: Dartmouth College (BA); University of Essex; Yale University (MA); Yale Law School (JD)

Donald Carl Pogue (May 24, 1947 – October 26, 2016) was a United States Judge of the United States Court of International Trade and served as Chair of the Court's Long Range Planning Committee and Budget Committee. He was appointed to the Trade Court in 1995 by President Bill Clinton.

== Biography ==
=== Education ===
Pogue was born in 1947 in Macomb, Illinois. Pogue is a magna cum laude and Phi Beta Kappa graduate of Dartmouth College, where he received a Bachelor of Arts degree, with highest honors in government, and has done graduate work at the University of Essex, England. He received a Juris Doctor from Yale Law School and a Masters of Arts in philosophy from Yale University.

=== Career ===
Pogue engaged in private practice in New Haven, Connecticut, from 1974 to 1975 and in Hartford, Connecticut, from 1976 to 1989 with the law firm of Kestell, Pogue & Gould. He served as Director of the Connecticut branch of the American Federation of State, County and Municipal Employees from 1975 to 1976. He served as an Adjunct Lecturer on labor law at the University of Connecticut School of Law from 1979 to 1982 and assisted in teaching the Harvard Law School's program on negotiations and dispute resolution for lawyers. He served as Commissioner and Chairman of the Connecticut Commissions of Hospitals and Health Care from 1989 to 1994. He served as a Judge of the Connecticut Superior Court from 1994 to 1995, presiding over criminal court in New Haven, Connecticut.

== Trade Court service ==
On June 30, 1995, President Bill Clinton nominated Pogue to serve as a judge of the United States Court of International Trade, to the seat vacated by Judge James Lopez Watson. He was confirmed by the Senate on August 11, 1995 and received his commission on August 14, 1995. He served as chief judge of the court from 2010 to 2014. He assumed senior status on July 1, 2014, and served in that status until his death on October 26, 2016.

Legal offices
Preceded by James Lopez Watson	Judge of the United States Court of International Trade; 1995–2014	Succeeded by M. Miller Baker
Preceded by Jane A. Restani	Chief Judge of the United States Court of International Trade; 2010–2014	Succeeded by Timothy C. Stanceu
