= List of federal judges appointed by Calvin Coolidge =

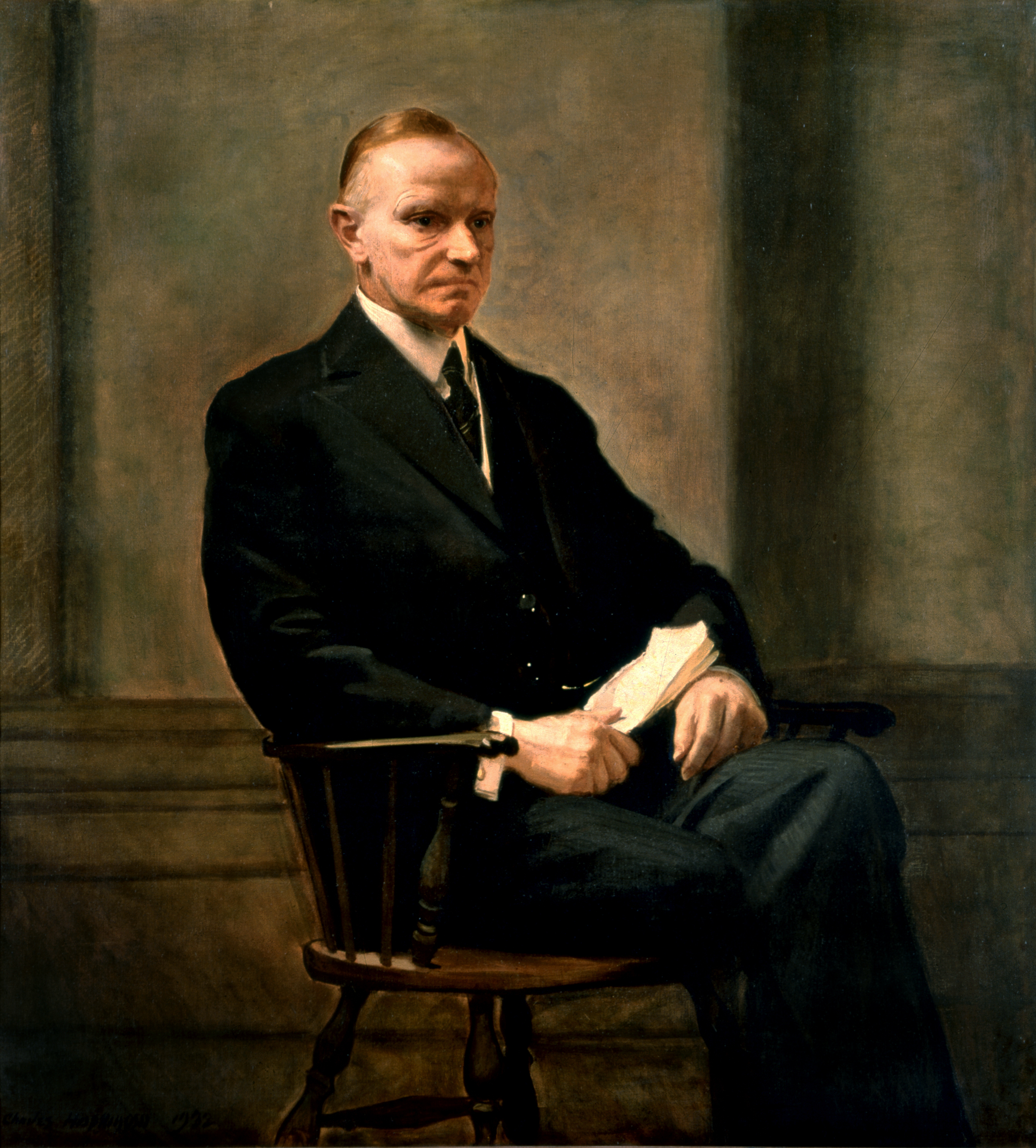
President Calvin Coolidge.

Following is a list of all Article III United States federal judges appointed by President Calvin Coolidge during his presidency. In total, Coolidge appointed 82 Article III federal judges, surpassing the previous record of 80 appointed by Theodore Roosevelt. These included one Justice to the Supreme Court of the United States, 17 judges to the United States Courts of Appeals, and 64 judges to the United States district courts.

Coolidge appointed judges to various Article I specialty courts as well, including Genevieve R. Cline, who became the first woman named to the Federal judiciary when Coolidge placed her on the United States Customs Court in 1928. Among Coolidge's Article I Federal judicial appointments are 2 judges to the United States Court of Customs Appeals (later the United States Court of Customs and Patent Appeals), 4 judges to the United States Court of Claims, 1 member of the Board of General Appraisers (later the United States Customs Court) and 2 judges to the United States Customs Court.

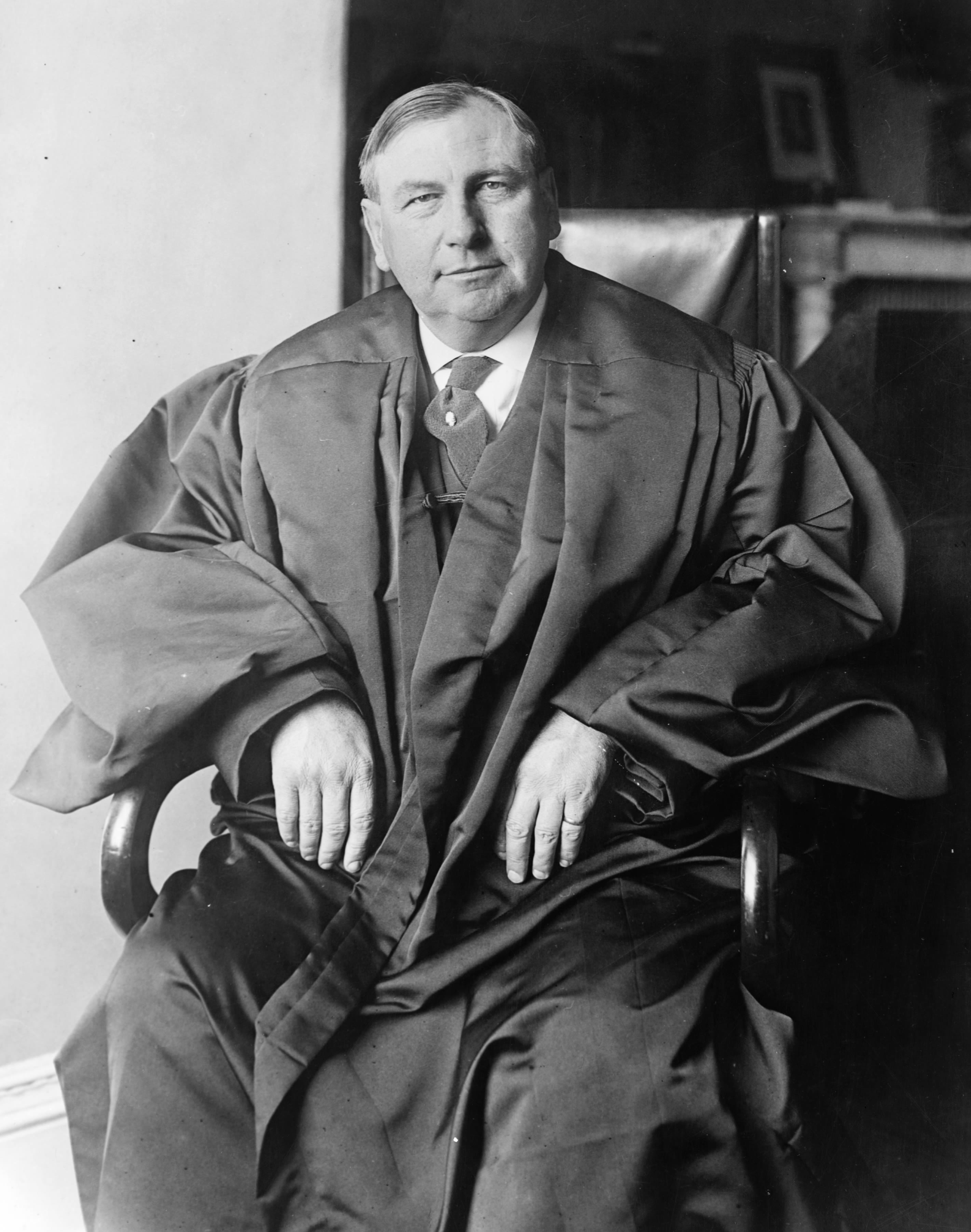
Coolidge named Harlan F. Stone to the Supreme Court.

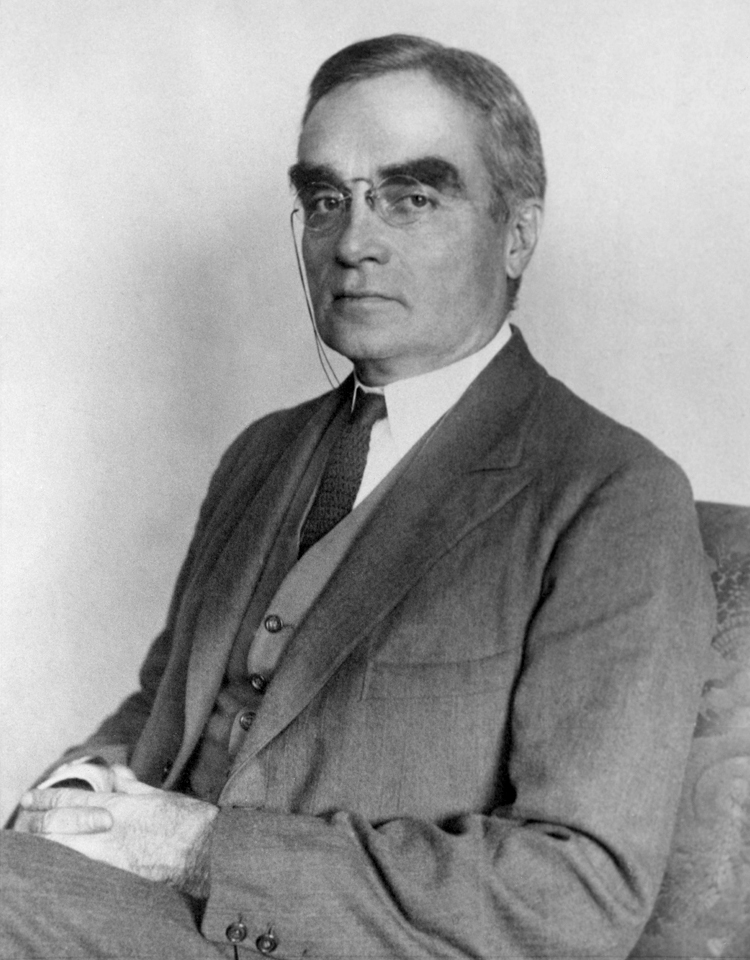
Learned Hand, named by Coolidge to the United States Court of Appeals for the Second Circuit, remains among the most well-cited judges.

== United States Supreme Court justices ==
| # | Justice | Seat | State | Former justice | Nomination date | Confirmation date | Began active service | Ended active service | Ended retired service |
|---|---|---|---|---|---|---|---|---|---|
| 1 | Harlan F. Stone | 9 | New York | Joseph McKenna | January 5, 1925 | February 5, 1925 | February 5, 1925 | July 3, 1941 | Elevated |

== Courts of appeals ==
| # | Judge | Circuit | Nomination date | Confirmation date | Began active service | Ended active service | Ended senior status |
|---|---|---|---|---|---|---|---|
| 1 | George Ewing Martin | D.C. | May 16, 1924 | May 22, 1924 | May 22, 1924 | September 30, 1937 | April 14, 1948 |
| 2 | Learned Hand | Second | December 2, 1924 | December 20, 1924 | December 20, 1924 | June 1, 1951 | August 18, 1961 |
| 3 | Albert B. Anderson | Seventh | January 2, 1925 | January 6, 1925 | January 6, 1925 | October 30, 1929 | April 27, 1938 |
| 4 | Rufus Edward Foster | Fifth | January 3, 1925 | January 13, 1925 | January 13, 1925 | August 23, 1942 | – |
| 5 | Charles Harwood Moorman | Sixth | January 2, 1925 | January 13, 1925 | January 13, 1925 | January 26, 1938 | – |
| 6 | Wilbur F. Booth | Eighth | March 18, 1925 | March 18, 1925 | March 18, 1925 | January 1, 1932 | July 7, 1944 |
| 7 | Arba Seymour Van Valkenburgh | Eighth | March 18, 1925 | March 18, 1925 | March 18, 1925 | May 1, 1933 | November 4, 1944 |
| 8 | Wallace McCamant | Ninth | December 8, 1925 | – | May 25, 1925 | May 2, 1926 | – |
| 9 | John J. Parker | Fourth | December 8, 1925 | December 14, 1925 | October 3, 1925 | March 17, 1958 | – |
| 10 | Thomas Walter Swan | Second | December 15, 1926 | December 22, 1926 | December 22, 1926 | July 1, 1953 | July 13, 1975 |
| 11 | Frank Sigel Dietrich | Ninth | December 22, 1926 | January 3, 1927 | January 3, 1927 | October 2, 1930 | – |
| 12 | Elliott Northcott | Fourth | April 6, 1927 | December 15, 1927 | December 15, 1927 | October 15, 1939 | January 3, 1946 |
| 13 | Augustus Noble Hand | Second | December 6, 1927 | January 18, 1928 | May 19, 1927 | June 30, 1953 | October 28, 1954 |
| 14 | John Hazelton Cotteral | Eighth / Tenth | May 19, 1928 | May 23, 1928 | May 23, 1928 | April 22, 1933 | – |
| 15 | Xenophon Hicks | Sixth | May 19, 1928 | May 23, 1928 | May 23, 1928 | March 1, 1952 | November 2, 1952 |
| 16 | Smith Hickenlooper | Sixth | December 6, 1928 | December 17, 1928 | December 17, 1928 | December 22, 1933 | – |
| 17 | Harrie B. Chase | Second | January 19, 1929 | January 31, 1929 | January 31, 1929 | September 1, 1954 | November 17, 1969 |

== District courts ==
| # | Judge | Court (Note: See List of United States district and territorial courts) | Nomination date | Confirmation date | Began active service | Ended active service | Ended senior status |
|---|---|---|---|---|---|---|---|
| 1 | Robert Alexander Inch (Note: Joint appointment; received recess appointment from Warren G. Harding and commission from Calvin Coolidge.) | E.D.N.Y. | December 15, 1923 | January 8, 1924 | April 28, 1923 | January 6, 1958 | January 12, 1961 |
| 2 | J. Stanley Webster | E.D. Wash. | December 15, 1923 | January 16, 1924 | April 28, 1923 | August 31, 1939 | December 24, 1962 |
| 3 | William Alexander Cant | D. Minn. | December 15, 1923 | January 15, 1924 | May 21, 1923 | January 12, 1933 | – |
| 4 | Ernest Ford Cochran | E.D.S.C. | December 15, 1923 | January 17, 1924 | November 22, 1923 | March 4, 1934 | – |
| 5 | Charles Harwood Moorman | W.D. Ky. | January 3, 1924 | January 8, 1924 | January 8, 1924 | February 2, 1925 | Elevated |
| 6 | Frank Henry Kerrigan | N.D. Cal. | January 21, 1924 | January 28, 1924 | January 28, 1924 | February 9, 1935 | – |
| 7 | Charles B. Davis | E.D. Mo. | January 21, 1924 | January 31, 1924 | January 31, 1924 | March 3, 1943 | – |
| 8 | Charles Nelson Pray | D. Mont. | January 21, 1924 | February 8, 1924 | February 8, 1924 | April 10, 1957 | September 12, 1963 |
| 9 | Paul John McCormick | S.D. Cal. | February 7, 1924 | February 11, 1924 | February 11, 1924 | September 1, 1951 | December 2, 1960 |
| 10 | Lake Jones | S.D. Fla. | February 1, 1924 | February 18, 1924 | February 18, 1924 | June 7, 1930 | – |
| 11 | Franklin Elmore Kennamer | E.D. Okla. / N.D. Okla. | January 28, 1924 | February 19, 1924 | February 19, 1924 | June 1, 1940 | May 1, 1960 |
| 12 | Benjamin C. Dawkins Sr. | W.D. La. | April 25, 1924 | May 5, 1924 | May 5, 1924 | May 17, 1953 | August 22, 1966 |
| 13 | Charles Albert Boynton | W.D. Tex. | December 16, 1924 | December 17, 1924 | December 17, 1924 | May 1, 1947 | October 12, 1954 |
| 14 | Robert C. Baltzell | D. Ind. / S.D. Ind. | January 2, 1925 | January 13, 1925 | January 13, 1925 | January 19, 1950 | October 18, 1950 |
| 15 | Charles I. Dawson | W.D. Ky. | January 2, 1925 | January 13, 1925 | January 13, 1925 | June 30, 1935 | – |
| 16 | Isaac Melson Meekins | E.D.N.C. | January 9, 1925 | January 17, 1925 | January 17, 1925 | February 13, 1945 | November 21, 1946 |
| 17 | Charlton Beattie | E.D. La. | January 13, 1925 | January 19, 1925 | January 21, 1925 | August 23, 1925 | – |
| 18 | Thomas D. Thacher | S.D.N.Y. | January 9, 1925 | January 19, 1925 | January 21, 1925 | April 10, 1930 | – |
| 19 | Benson W. Hough | S.D. Ohio | January 31, 1925 | February 9, 1925 | February 9, 1925 | November 19, 1935 | – |
| 20 | Thomas Whitten Slick | D. Ind. / N.D. Ind. | February 6, 1925 | February 17, 1925 | February 17, 1925 | September 16, 1943 | – |
| 21 | Adolphus Frederic St. Sure | N.D. Cal. | February 16, 1925 | February 23, 1925 | February 23, 1925 | June 30, 1947 | February 5, 1949 |
| 22 | Joseph W. Molyneaux | D. Minn. | March 18, 1925 | March 18, 1925 | March 18, 1925 | February 28, 1937 | January 24, 1940 |
| 23 | John B. Sanborn Jr. | D. Minn. | March 18, 1925 | March 18, 1925 | March 18, 1925 | February 2, 1932 | Elevated |
| 24 | Merrill E. Otis | W.D. Mo. | December 8, 1925 | December 14, 1925 | March 23, 1925 | December 23, 1944 | – |
| 25 | Edward J. Henning | S.D. Cal. | December 8, 1925 | December 15, 1925 | April 24, 1925 | December 31, 1929 | – |
| 26 | Fred Morton Raymond | W.D. Mich. | December 8, 1925 | December 18, 1925 | May 8, 1925 | February 6, 1946 | – |
| 27 | William Clark | D.N.J. | December 8, 1925 | December 17, 1925 | May 21, 1925 | June 25, 1938 | Elevated |
| 28 | Albert Williams Johnson | M.D. Pa. | December 8, 1925 | December 17, 1925 | May 21, 1925 | June 28, 1945 | – |
| 29 | Harry B. Anderson | W.D. Tenn. | December 8, 1925 | January 29, 1926 | September 12, 1925 | April 9, 1935 | – |
| 30 | Louis Henry Burns | E.D. La. | December 8, 1925 | December 21, 1925 | October 3, 1925 | June 9, 1928 | – |
| 31 | Grover M. Moscowitz | E.D.N.Y. | December 16, 1925 | December 21, 1925 | December 21, 1925 | March 31, 1947 | – |
| 32 | William Josiah Tilson | M.D. Ga. | June 9, 1926 | – | July 6, 1926 | March 4, 1927 | – |
| 32.1 | William Josiah Tilson | M.D. Ga. | December 7, 1926 | – | March 5, 1927 | March 19, 1928 | Elevated |
| 33 | Charles Cheatham Cavanah | D. Idaho | December 22, 1926 | January 3, 1927 | January 3, 1927 | January 3, 1942 | June 30, 1953 |
| 34 | John Hugh McNary | D. Ore. | February 26, 1927 | February 28, 1927 | February 28, 1927 | October 25, 1936 | – |
| 35 | Fred Louis Wham | E.D. Ill. | February 26, 1927 | March 1, 1927 | March 1, 1927 | March 3, 1956 | February 2, 1967 |
| 36 | William H. Kirkpatrick | E.D. Pa. | March 3, 1927 | March 3, 1927 | March 3, 1927 | May 1, 1958 | November 28, 1970 |
| 37 | William Caldwell Coleman | D. Md. | December 6, 1927 | December 19, 1927 | April 6, 1927 | June 1, 1955 | – |
| 38 | Johnson Jay Hayes | M.D.N.C. | December 6, 1927 | January 9, 1928 | April 6, 1927 | June 18, 1957 | October 22, 1970 |
| 39 | Frederick Howard Bryant | N.D.N.Y. | December 6, 1927 | December 19, 1927 | May 19, 1927 | September 4, 1945 | – |
| 40 | Frank Joseph Coleman | S.D.N.Y. | December 6, 1927 | December 19, 1927 | May 19, 1927 | March 14, 1934 | – |
| 41 | Simon L. Adler | W.D.N.Y | December 6, 1927 | January 16, 1928 | May 19, 1927 | May 23, 1934 | – |
| 42 | Ira Lloyd Letts | D.R.I. | December 6, 1927 | January 4, 1928 | June 9, 1927 | June 24, 1935 | – |
| 43 | Edward Julien Moinet | E.D. Mich. | December 6, 1927 | December 19, 1927 | June 13, 1927 | February 28, 1946 | December 23, 1952 |
| 44 | George Thomas McDermott | D. Kan. | December 13, 1927 (Note: Renominated on January 12, 1928.) | January 16, 1928 | January 16, 1928 | April 30, 1929 | Elevated |
| 45 | Charles Almon Dewey | S.D. Iowa | January 23, 1928 | January 31, 1928 | January 31, 1928 | March 1, 1949 | March 2, 1958 |
| 46 | Warren Booth Burrows | D. Conn. | February 3, 1928 | February 16, 1928 | February 16, 1928 | October 20, 1930 | – |
| 47 | John Ellis Martineau | E.D. Ark. | March 2, 1928 | March 2, 1928 | March 2, 1928 | March 6, 1937 | – |
| 48 | Bascom Sine Deaver | M.D. Ga. | March 5, 1928 | March 19, 1928 | March 19, 1928 | October 13, 1944 | – |
| 49 | Peyton Gordon | D.D.C. | February 27, 1928 | March 29, 1928 | March 29, 1928 | February 4, 1941 | September 17, 1946 |
| 50 | Harold Louderback | N.D. Cal. | March 21, 1928 | April 17, 1928 | April 17, 1928 | December 11, 1941 | – |
| 51 | Frank Herbert Norcross | D. Nev. | April 2, 1928 | April 17, 1928 | April 17, 1928 | April 30, 1945 | November 4, 1952 |
| 52 | George Caldwell Taylor | E.D. Tenn. | May 24, 1928 | May 26, 1928 | May 26, 1928 | November 2, 1949 | December 19, 1952 |
| 53 | Edgar Sullins Vaught | W.D. Okla. | May 26, 1928 (Note: Renominated on December 6, 1928.) | January 8, 1929 | May 31, 1928 | April 22, 1956 | December 5, 1959 |
| 54 | Nelson McVicar | W.D. Pa. | December 6, 1928 | December 17, 1928 | September 14, 1928 | February 1, 1951 | December 20, 1960 |
| 55 | Wayne G. Borah | E.D. La. | December 6, 1928 | December 17, 1928 | October 3, 1928 | October 23, 1949 | Elevated |
| 56 | James William McCarthy | D.N.J. | December 6, 1928 (Note: Previously nominated on March 18, 1925 to another seat on the same court. Confirmed on the same day, but declined the appointment.) | January 8, 1929 | October 6, 1928 | January 31, 1929 | – |
| 57 | George Philip Hahn | N.D. Ohio | December 6, 1928 | December 17, 1928 | December 17, 1928 | February 12, 1937 | – |
| 58 | Samuel H. West | N.D. Ohio | December 10, 1928 | December 17, 1928 | December 17, 1928 | October 5, 1938 | – |
| 59 | Robert Reasoner Nevin | S.D. Ohio | January 5, 1929 | January 21, 1929 | January 21, 1929 | December 31, 1952 | – |
| 60 | Guy Leverne Fake | D.N.J. | February 4, 1929 | February 12, 1929 | February 12, 1929 | February 21, 1951 | September 23, 1957 |
| 61 | Alexander Akerman | S.D. Fla. | January 19, 1929 | February 15, 1929 | February 15, 1929 | October 8, 1939 | August 21, 1948 |
| 62 | Halsted L. Ritter | S.D. Fla. | January 23, 1929 | February 15, 1929 | February 15, 1929 | April 17, 1936 | – |
| 63 | Elijah Allen Cox | N.D. Miss. | March 1, 1929 | March 2, 1929 | March 2, 1929 | March 22, 1957 | August 28, 1974 |
| 64 | Charles Edgar Woodward | N.D. Ill. | March 1, 1929 | March 2, 1929 | March 2, 1929 | May 15, 1942 | – |

== Specialty courts (Article I) ==
=== United States Court of Customs Appeals ===
The United States Court of Custons Appeals became the United States Court of Customs and Patent Appeals on March 2, 1929.

| # | Judge | Nomination date | Confirmation date | Began active service | Ended active service | Ended senior status |
|---|---|---|---|---|---|---|
| 1 | William J. Graham | May 26, 1924 | May 29, 1924 | May 29, 1924 | November 10, 1937 | – |
| 2 | Finis J. Garrett | February 14, 1929 | February 18, 1929 | February 18, 1929 | December 1, 1937 | – |

=== United States Court of Claims ===
| # | Judge | Nomination date | Confirmation date | Began active service | Ended active service | Ended senior status |
|---|---|---|---|---|---|---|
| 1 | J. McKenzie Moss | May 26, 1926 | June 7, 1926 | June 7, 1926 | June 11, 1929 | – |
| 2 | William R. Green | February 20, 1928 | March 12, 1928 | March 12, 1928 | May 29, 1940 | June 11, 1947 |
| 3 | Fenton Whitlock Booth | April 18, 1928 (Note: Previously nominated to the same seat on January 2, 1913 by President Taft. That nomination expired at the end of the term. Renominated to the same seat upon it becoming vacant again by President Coolidge on April 18, 1928.) | April 18, 1928 | April 18, 1928 | June 15, 1939 | July 26, 1947 |
| 4 | Nicholas J. Sinnott | April 18, 1928 | April 20, 1928 | April 20, 1928 | July 20, 1929 | – |

=== United States Customs Court ===
The Board of General Appraisers became the United States Customs Court on May 28, 1926.

| # | Judge | Nomination date | Confirmation date | Began active service | Ended active service | Ended senior status |
|---|---|---|---|---|---|---|
| 1 | George M. Young | May 19, 1924 | May 23, 1924 | May 24, 1924 | May 27, 1932 | – |
| 2 | Genevieve R. Cline | May 4, 1928 | May 25, 1928 | May 26, 1928 | March 1, 1953 | – |
| 3 | William Josiah Tilson | February 6, 1928 | February 27, 1928 | February 28, 1928 | May 26, 1949 | – |

== Notes ==
Renominations

== Sources ==
- Federal Judicial Center
