= William Josiah Tilson =

American judge

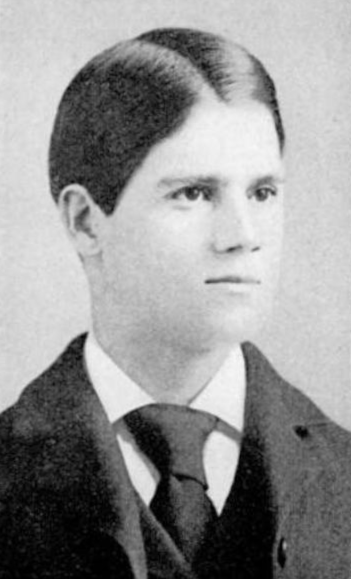

Presiding Judge of the United States Customs Court
- In office 1932–1934
- Preceded by: George M. Young
- Succeeded by: Charles P. McClelland

Judge of the United States Customs Court
- In office February 28, 1928 – May 26, 1949
- Appointed by: Calvin Coolidge
- Preceded by: William Barberie Howell
- Succeeded by: Morgan Ford

Judge of the United States District Court for the Middle District of Georgia
- In office March 5, 1927 – March 19, 1928
- Appointed by: Calvin Coolidge
- Preceded by: himself
- Succeeded by: Bascom Sine Deaver

Judge of the United States District Court for the Middle District of Georgia
- In office July 6, 1926 – March 4, 1927
- Appointed by: Calvin Coolidge
- Preceded by: Seat established by 44 Stat. 670
- Succeeded by: himself

Personal details
- Born: William Josiah Tilson; August 13, 1871 Clear Branch, Tennessee, US
- Died: May 26, 1949 (aged 77) Sunapee, New Hampshire, US
- Education: Yale University (A.B.); Yale Law School (LL.B., LL.M.)

William Josiah Tilson (August 13, 1871 – May 26, 1949) was briefly a United States district judge of the United States District Court for the Middle District of Georgia and was a Judge of the United States Customs Court.

== Education and career ==
Born on August 13, 1871, in Clear Branch, Tennessee, Tilson received an Artium Baccalaureus degree in 1894 from Yale University, a Bachelor of Laws in 1896 from Yale Law School and a Master of Laws in 1897 from the same institution. He was in private practice in Atlanta, Georgia from 1898 to 1926.

== Federal judicial service ==
Tilson received a recess appointment from President Calvin Coolidge on July 6, 1926, to the United States District Court for the Middle District of Georgia, to a new seat authorized by 44 Stat. 670. He was nominated to the same position by President Coolidge on December 7, 1926. His service terminated on March 4, 1927, after nomination was not confirmed by the United States Senate, his nomination having been withdrawn on February 8, 1927. He had been previously nominated to the same position on June 9, 1926, but that nomination was withdrawn on June 19, 1926.

Tilson received a second recess appointment to the United States District Court for the Middle District of Georgia from President Coolidge on March 5, 1927, to the seat vacated by himself. His service terminated on March 19, 1928, due to his resignation to accept a judgeship on a different court.

Tilson was nominated by President Coolidge on February 6, 1928, to an Associate Justice seat (Judge from June 17, 1930) on the United States Customs Court vacated by Associate Justice William Barberie Howell. He was confirmed by the Senate on February 27, 1928, and received his commission on February 28, 1928. He served as Presiding Judge from 1932 to 1934. His service terminated on May 26, 1949, due to his death in Sunapee, New Hampshire. He was succeeded by Judge Morgan Ford.

== Sources ==
Legal offices
Preceded by Seat established by 44 Stat. 670	Judge of the United States District Court for the Middle District of Georgia; 1926–1927	Succeeded by himself
Preceded by himself	Judge of the United States District Court for the Middle District of Georgia; 1927–1928	Succeeded by Bascom Sine Deaver
Preceded by William Barberie Howell	Judge of the United States Customs Court; 1928–1949	Succeeded by Morgan Ford
Preceded by George M. Young	Presiding Judge of the United States Customs Court; 1932–1934	Succeeded by Charles P. McClelland
