= James Lopez Watson =

American politician and judge (1922-2001)

Senior Judge of the United States Court of International Trade
- In office February 28, 1991 – September 1, 2001

Judge of the United States Court of International Trade
- In office November 1, 1980 – February 28, 1991
- Appointed by: operation of law
- Preceded by: Seat established by 94 Stat. 1727
- Succeeded by: Donald C. Pogue

Judge of the United States Customs Court
- In office March 7, 1966 – November 1, 1980
- Appointed by: Lyndon B. Johnson
- Preceded by: Jed Johnson
- Succeeded by: Seat abolished

Member of the New York Senate from the 21st district
- In office 1954–1963
- Preceded by: Julius A. Archibald
- Succeeded by: Constance Baker Motley

Personal details
- Born: James Lopez Watson; May 21, 1922 New York City, U.S.
- Died: September 1, 2001 (aged 79) New York City, U.S.
- Education: New York University (BA); Brooklyn Law School (LLB)

James Lopez Watson (May 21, 1922 – September 1, 2001) was an American lawyer who served as a federal judge of the United States Court of International Trade. While serving as a judge around the country, Watson became the first African-American to head a federal court in the American Deep South.

== Education and career ==
Born on May 21, 1922, in Harlem in New York City, the son of James S. Watson and Violet Watson, James L. Watson served in the United States Army from 1943 to 1945, where he fought in Italy and received the Purple Heart. He received a Bachelor of Arts degree in 1947 from New York University and a Bachelor of Laws in 1951 from Brooklyn Law School. He was engaged in private practice from 1951 to 1953. He was a member of the New York State Senate from 1954 to 1963. He was a Judge of the New York City Civil Court from 1963 to 1966.

=== New York State Senate service ===
Watson was a member of the New York State Senate (21st D.) from 1955 to 1963, sitting in the 170th, 171st, 172nd, 173rd, and 174th New York State Legislatures.

== Federal judicial service ==
Watson was nominated by President Lyndon B. Johnson on January 19, 1966, to a seat on the United States Customs Court vacated by Judge Jed Johnson. He was confirmed by the United States Senate on March 4, 1966, and received his commission on March 7, 1966. He was reassigned by operation of law to the United States Court of International Trade on November 1, 1980, to a new seat authorized by 94 Stat. 1727. Because judges of that court are periodically assigned to federal courts around the country, Watson became the first African-American judge to head a federal court in the Deep South. He assumed senior status on February 28, 1991. His service terminated due to his death from cancer in Harlem on September 1, 2001.

== Honor ==
In 2003, the courthouse at 1 Federal Plaza in Manhattan was renamed the James L. Watson United States Court of International Trade Building in Watson's honor.

== See also ==
- List of African-American federal judges
- List of African-American jurists
- List of first minority male lawyers and judges in the United States

== Sources ==
New York State Senate
Preceded by Julius A. Archibald	New York State Senate 21st District; 1955–1963	Succeeded by Constance Baker Motley
Legal offices
Preceded by Jed Johnson	Judge of the United States Customs Court; 1966–1980	Succeeded by Seat abolished
Preceded by Seat established by 94 Stat. 1727	Judge of the United States Court of International Trade; 1980–1991	Succeeded by Donald C. Pogue
