= William C. Adamson =

American politician (1854–1929)

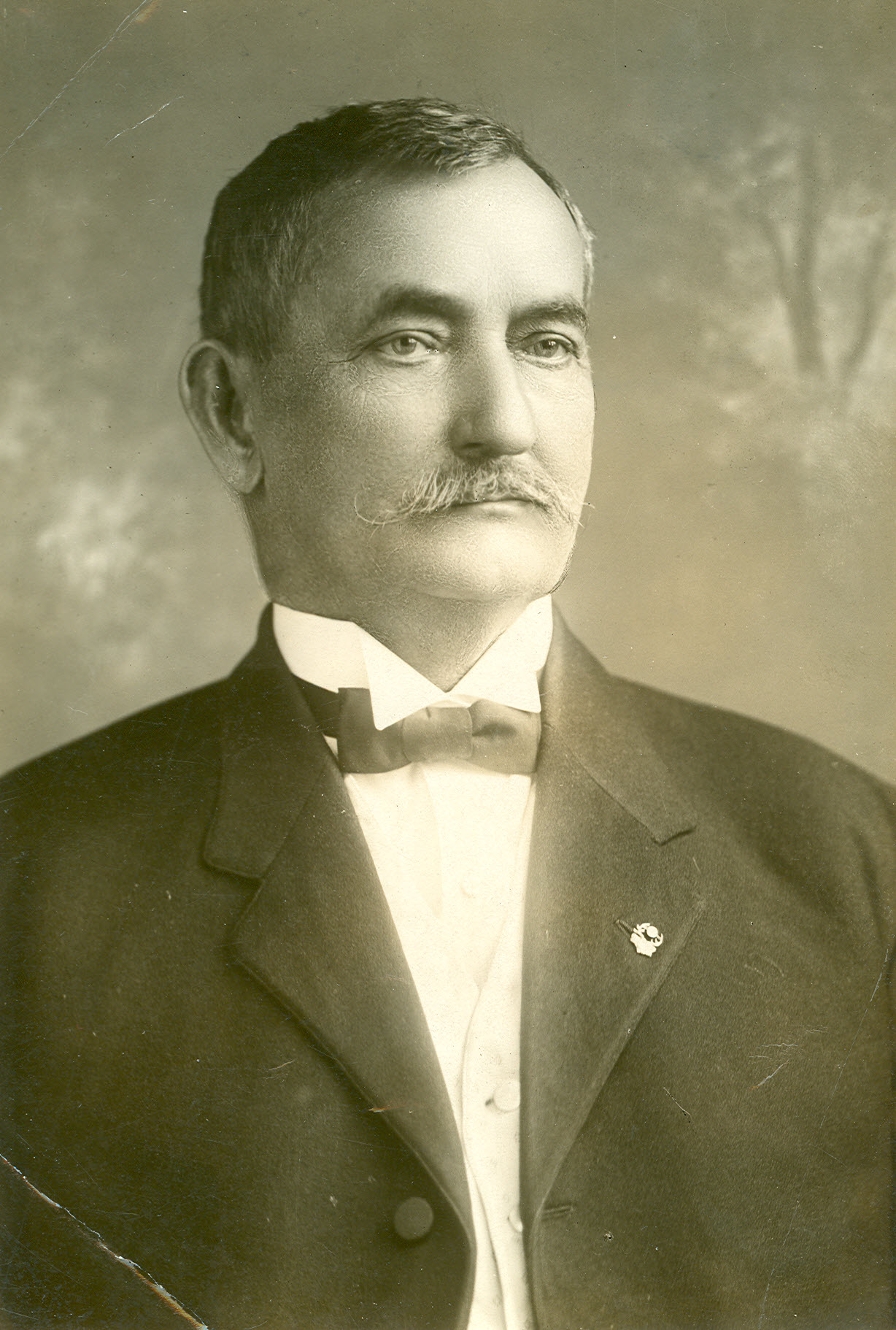

Associate Justice of the United States Customs Court
- In office May 28, 1926 – January 20, 1928
- Appointed by: operation of law
- Preceded by: Seat established by 44 Stat. 669
- Succeeded by: Genevieve R. Cline

Member of the Board of General Appraisers
- In office September 24, 1917 – May 28, 1926
- Appointed by: Woodrow Wilson
- Preceded by: Henderson M. Somerville
- Succeeded by: Seat abolished

Member of the U.S. House of Representatives from Georgia's 4th district
- In office March 4, 1897 – December 18, 1917
- Preceded by: Charles L. Moses
- Succeeded by: William C. Wright

Personal details
- Born: William Charles Adamson; August 13, 1854 Bowdon, Georgia, US
- Died: January 3, 1929 (aged 74) New York City, US
- Resting place: City Cemetery; Carrollton, Georgia
- Party: Democratic
- Education: Bowdon College (A.B.) read law

William Charles Adamson (August 13, 1854 – January 3, 1929) was a United States representative from Georgia, an Associate Justice of the United States Customs Court and a member of the Board of General Appraisers.

== Early years and family ==
Adamson was born on August 13, 1854, in Bowdon, Georgia, son of John W. Adamson and Mary A. McDaniel, and grandson of William C. Adamson, and of John McDaniel.

He attended the common schools. His youth was spent on a farm and in hauling cotton and goods between Atlanta and Bowdon, Georgia.

He was married on January 29, 1885, to Minna Reese of Carrollton, Georgia.

== Education and career ==
Adamson received an Artium Baccalaureus degree from Bowdon College in 1874. He read law in the office of the Hon. S. W. Harris and was admitted to the bar in October, 1876 and commenced practice in Carrollton, Georgia. He served as judge of the city court of Carrollton from 1885 to 1889. He served as an attorney for the city of Carrollton for a number of years. He served as delegate to the Democratic National Convention in 1892 and as a presidential elector in the 1892 Presidential election.

== Congressional service ==
Adamson was elected as a Democrat to the United States House of Representatives of the 55th United States Congress and to the ten succeeding Congresses and served from March 4, 1897, until December 18, 1917, when he resigned. He served as Chairman of the Committee on Interstate and Foreign Commerce for the 62nd through 65th United States Congresses.

=== Notable legislation ===
The Adamson Act, which regulated the hours of railroad workers, was named for Adamson.

== Federal Judicial Service ==
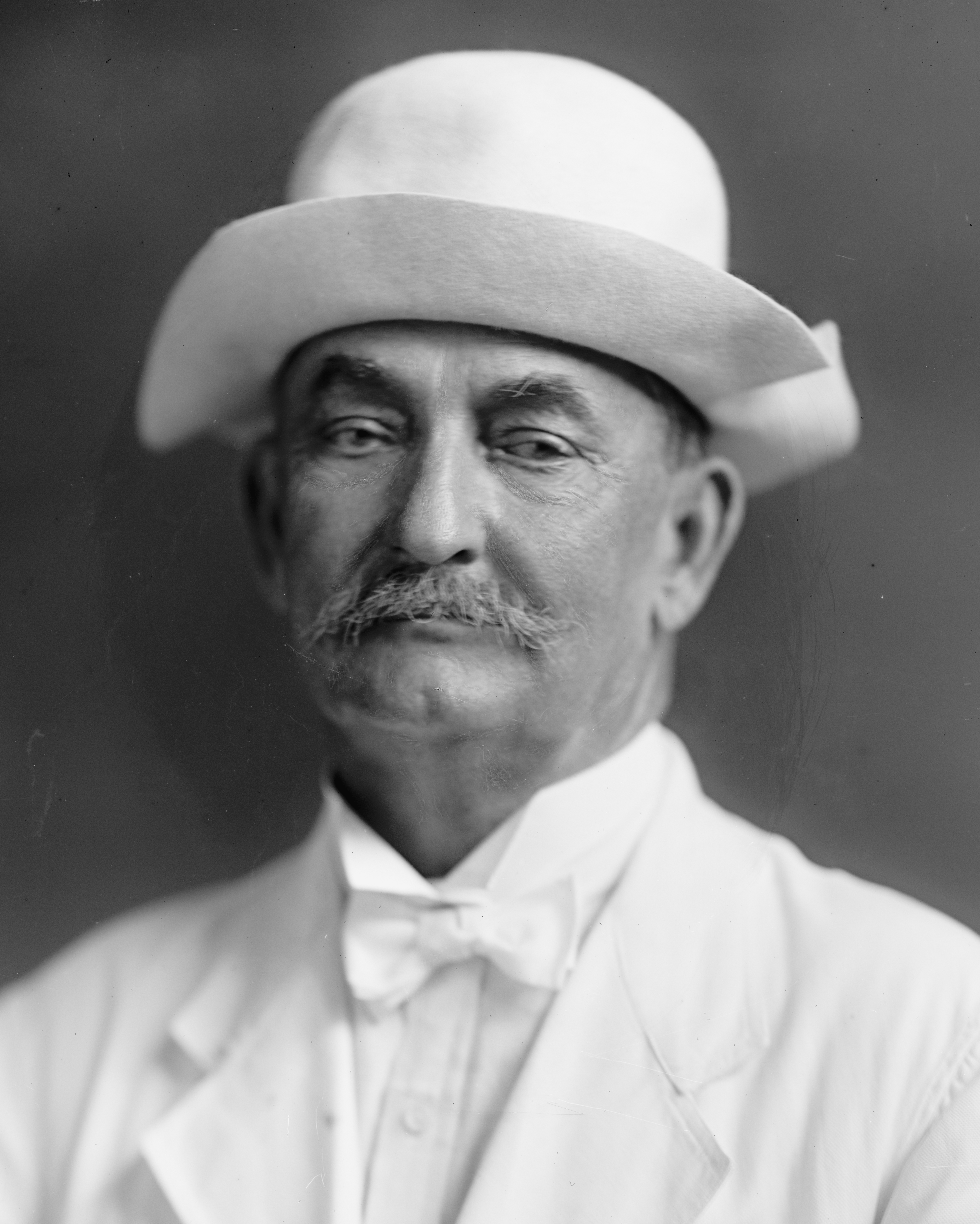
W. C. Adamson on unknown date

Adamson was nominated by President Woodrow Wilson on September 20, 1917, to a seat on the Board of General Appraisers vacated by Henderson M. Somerville. He was confirmed by the United States Senate on September 20, 1917, and received his commission on September 24, 1917.

Adamson was reassigned by operation of law to the United States Customs Court on May 28, 1926, to a new Associate Justice seat authorized by 44 Stat. 669. His service terminated on January 20, 1928, due to his retirement. He was succeeded by Associate Justice Genevieve R. Cline.

== Retirement and death ==
Adamson resumed the practice of law in Carrollton. He died while on a visit in New York City, New York, on January 3, 1929. He was interred in City Cemetery in Carrollton.

Adamson Square in downtown Carrollton was named in his honor.

U.S. House of Representatives
Preceded by Charles L. Moses	Member of the U.S. House of Representatives from Georgia's 4th congressional district 1897–1917	Succeeded by William C. Wright
Legal offices
Preceded by Henderson M. Somerville	Member of the Board of General Appraisers; 1917–1926	Succeeded by Seat abolished
Preceded by Seat established by 44 Stat. 669	Associate Justice of the United States Customs Court; 1926–1928	Succeeded by Genevieve R. Cline
