= Mary H. Donlon =

American judge

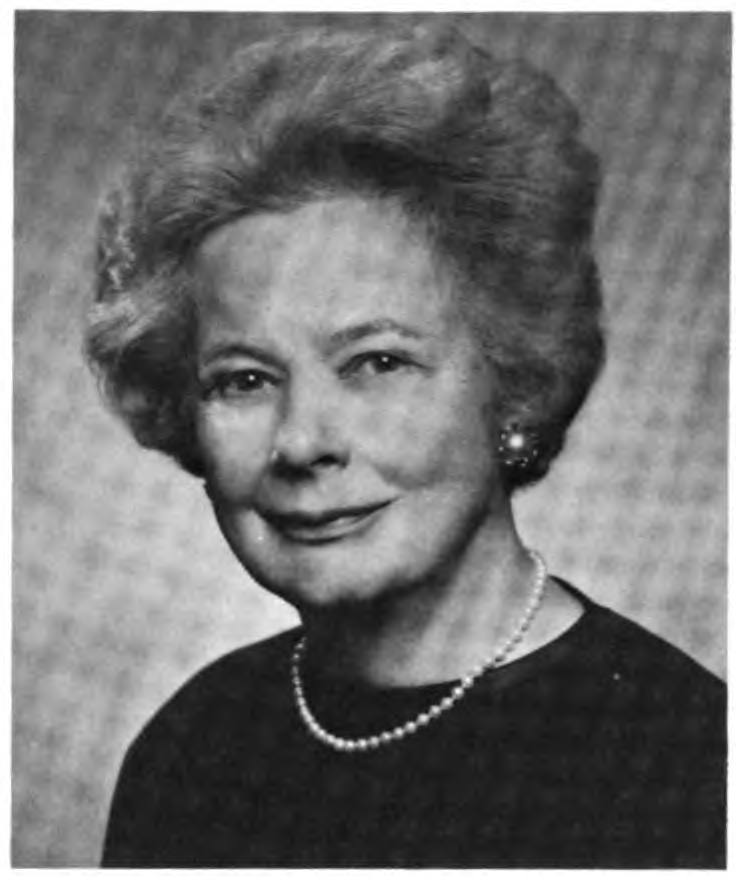

Senior Judge of the United States Customs Court
- In office October 1, 1966 – March 5, 1977

Judge of the United States Customs Court
- In office August 1, 1955 – October 1, 1966
- Appointed by: Dwight D. Eisenhower
- Preceded by: Genevieve R. Cline
- Succeeded by: Bernard Newman

Personal details
- Born: Mary Honor Donlon; August 25, 1893 Utica, New York
- Died: March 5, 1977 (aged 83) Tucson, Arizona
- Spouse: Martin J. Alger
- Education: Cornell University (LLB)
- Profession: Lawyer, Judge

Mary Honor Donlon, later Mary Donlon Alger, (August 25, 1893 – March 5, 1977) was a judge of the United States Customs Court.

== Education and career ==
Donlon was born on August 25, 1893, in Utica, New York, the daughter of Joseph M. Donlon and Mary (Coughlin) Donlon. She graduated from Cornell Law School, receiving a Bachelor of Laws in 1920. While a law student, she was the first female editor-in-chief of the Cornell Law Quarterly, and the first female editor-in-chief of any US law review. She served on Cornell's Board of Trustees from 1937 to 1966 when she became a Trustee Emeritus and Presidential Councillor. She worked in private practice in New York City from 1921 to 1944, being named a partner at Burke & Burke in 1928. She was Chairman of the New York State Industrial Board from 1945 to 1946. She was Chairman of the New York State Workers Compensation Board from 1945 to 1954. In 1947, she served on the Federal Social Security Advisory Council.

== Political career ==
In 1940, she ran on the Republican ticket for an at-large seat in the United States House of Representatives but lost to the Democratic incumbent Caroline Love Goodwin O'Day. She was a delegate to the 1948 Republican National Convention.

== Federal judicial service ==
Donlon was nominated by President Dwight D. Eisenhower on June 22, 1955, to a seat on the United States Customs Court vacated by Judge Genevieve R. Cline. She was confirmed by the United States Senate on July 29, 1955, and received her commission on August 1, 1955. Donlon was initially appointed as a Judge under Article I, but the court was raised to Article III status by operation of law on July 14, 1956, and Donlon thereafter served as an Article III Judge. She assumed senior status on October 1, 1966. Her service terminated on March 5, 1977, due to her death. She was succeeded by Judge Bernard Newman.

== Honors ==
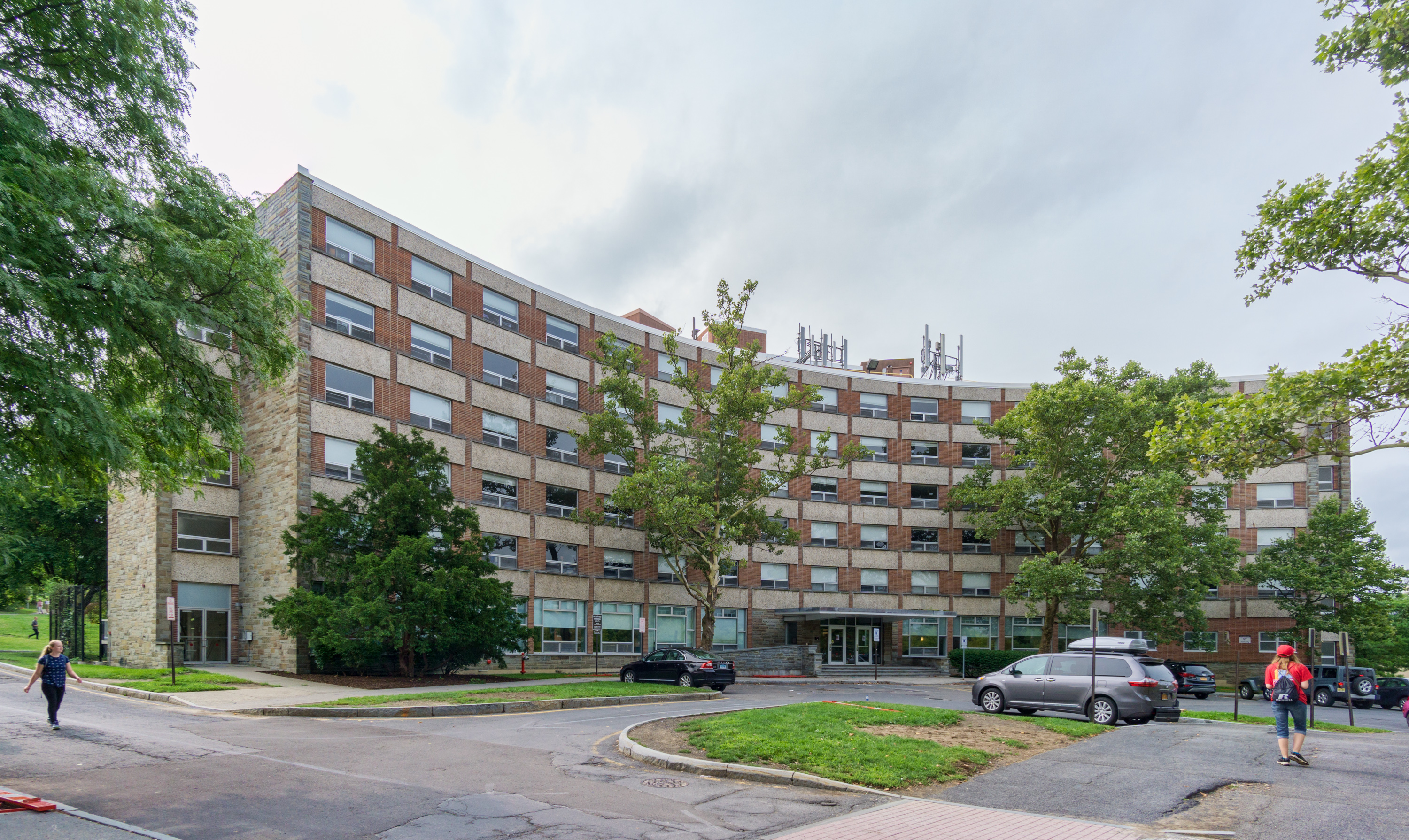
Mary Donlon Hall at Cornell University

In 1956, following the Hungarian uprising, Donlon established a scholarship to provide aid to any young Hungarian woman accepted to Cornell. She also endowed the annual Mary H. Donlon lectures in the ILR School. She also endowed a professorship in the College of Arts and Sciences, to be held only by women, which was held by Eleanor Harz Jorden and then Mary Beth Norton. In recognition for her generosity to Cornell and her service as trustee, a women's dormitory was named in her honor in 1961. A Conference for college trustees and administrators regarding affirmative action for women in education was also named in her honor.

== Later life and death ==
In 1971, Donlon married Martin J. Alger. She died at the Tucson Medical Center in Tucson, Arizona on March 5, 1977, after a brief illness.

== Sources ==
- Famous First Facts (5th Ed.), page 189, no. 3127
- Cornell Chronicle, 1977-03-10 p. 2
- Social Security history
- Women at Cornell: The Myth of Equal Education by Charlotte Williams Conable p. 14
- Mary Donlon, 1st Woman In New York State Named To Federal Bench, Is Dead in NYT on March 8, 1977 (subscription required)
- "Donlon, Mary Honor - Federal Judicial Center". www.fjc.gov.
- Mary H. Donlon Interview at the Kheel Center for Labor-Management Documentation and Archives, Cornell University Library

Legal offices
Preceded by Genevieve R. Cline	Judge of the United States Customs Court; 1955–1966	Succeeded by Bernard Newman
