= Bascom Sine Deaver =

American judge (1882–1944)

Judge of the United States District Court for the Middle District of Georgia
- In office March 19, 1928 – October 13, 1944
- Appointed by: Calvin Coolidge
- Preceded by: William Josiah Tilson
- Succeeded by: Thomas Hoyt Davis

Personal details
- Born: Bascom Sine Deaver; November 26, 1882 Union County, Georgia, U.S.
- Died: October 13, 1944 (aged 61)
- Education: Mercer University (A.B.); Mercer University School of Law (LL.B.)

Bascom Sine Deaver (November 26, 1882 – October 13, 1944) was a United States district judge of the United States District Court for the Middle District of Georgia.

== Education and career ==
Born in Union County, Georgia, Deaver received an Artium Baccalaureus from Mercer University in 1907 and a Bachelor of Laws from Mercer University School of Law in 1910. He was in private practice in Macon, Georgia from 1910 to 1922. He was an Assistant United States Attorney of the Southern District of Georgia from 1922 to 1926, and then was the United States Attorney for the Middle District of Georgia from 1926 to 1928.

== Federal judicial service ==
Deaver was nominated by President Calvin Coolidge on March 5, 1928, to a seat on the United States District Court for the Middle District of Georgia vacated by Judge William Josiah Tilson. He was confirmed by the United States Senate on March 19, 1928, and received his commission the same day. His service terminated on October 13, 1944, due to his death.

== Sources ==
Legal offices
| Preceded by William Josiah Tilson | Judge of the United States District Court for the Middle District of Georgia; 1928–1944 | Succeeded by Thomas Hoyt Davis |
