= Morgan Ford =

American judge

Morgan Dennis Ford

Senior Judge of the United States Court of International Trade
- In office December 31, 1985 – January 2, 1992

Judge of the United States Court of International Trade
- In office November 1, 1980 – December 31, 1985
- Appointed by: operation of law
- Preceded by: Seat established by 94 Stat. 1727
- Succeeded by: R. Kenton Musgrave

Judge of the United States Customs Court
- In office July 15, 1949 – November 1, 1980
- Appointed by: Harry S. Truman
- Preceded by: William Josiah Tilson
- Succeeded by: Seat abolished

Personal details
- Born: Morgan Dennis Ford; September 8, 1911 Wheatland, North Dakota
- Died: January 2, 1992 (aged 80) San Diego, California
- Education: University of North Dakota (BA); Georgetown Law (LLB)

Morgan Dennis Ford (September 8, 1911 – January 2, 1992) was a judge of the United States Court of International Trade.

== Education and career ==
Born on September 8, 1911, in Wheatland, North Dakota, Ford was the nephew of senator William "Wild Bill" Langer. He received a Bachelor of Arts degree in 1935 from the University of North Dakota. He received a Bachelor of Laws in 1938 from Georgetown Law. He worked in private practice in Fargo, North Dakota, from 1939 to 1949. He served as the city attorney of Casselton, North Dakota, from 1942 to 1948. He served as a member of the Selective Service Advisory Board from 1942 to 1945.

== Federal judicial service ==
Ford was nominated by President Harry S. Truman on June 22, 1949, to a seat on the United States Customs Court vacated by Judge William Josiah Tilson. He was confirmed by the United States Senate on July 12, 1949, and received his commission on July 15, 1949. Ford was initially appointed as a Judge under Article I, but the court was raised to Article III status by operation of law on July 14, 1956, and Ford thereafter served as an Article III Judge. Ford was reassigned by operation of law to the United States Court of International Trade on November 1, 1980, to a new seat authorized by 94 Stat. 1727. He assumed senior status on December 31, 1985. His service terminated on January 2, 1992, due to his death in San Diego, California. He was succeeded by Judge R. Kenton Musgrave.

== Sources ==
Legal offices
Preceded by William Josiah Tilson	Judge of the United States Customs Court; 1949–1980	Succeeded by Seat abolished
Preceded by Seat established by 94 Stat. 1727	Judge of the United States Court of International Trade; 1980–1985	Succeeded by R. Kenton Musgrave
