= George M. Young =

American politician and jurist (1870-1932)

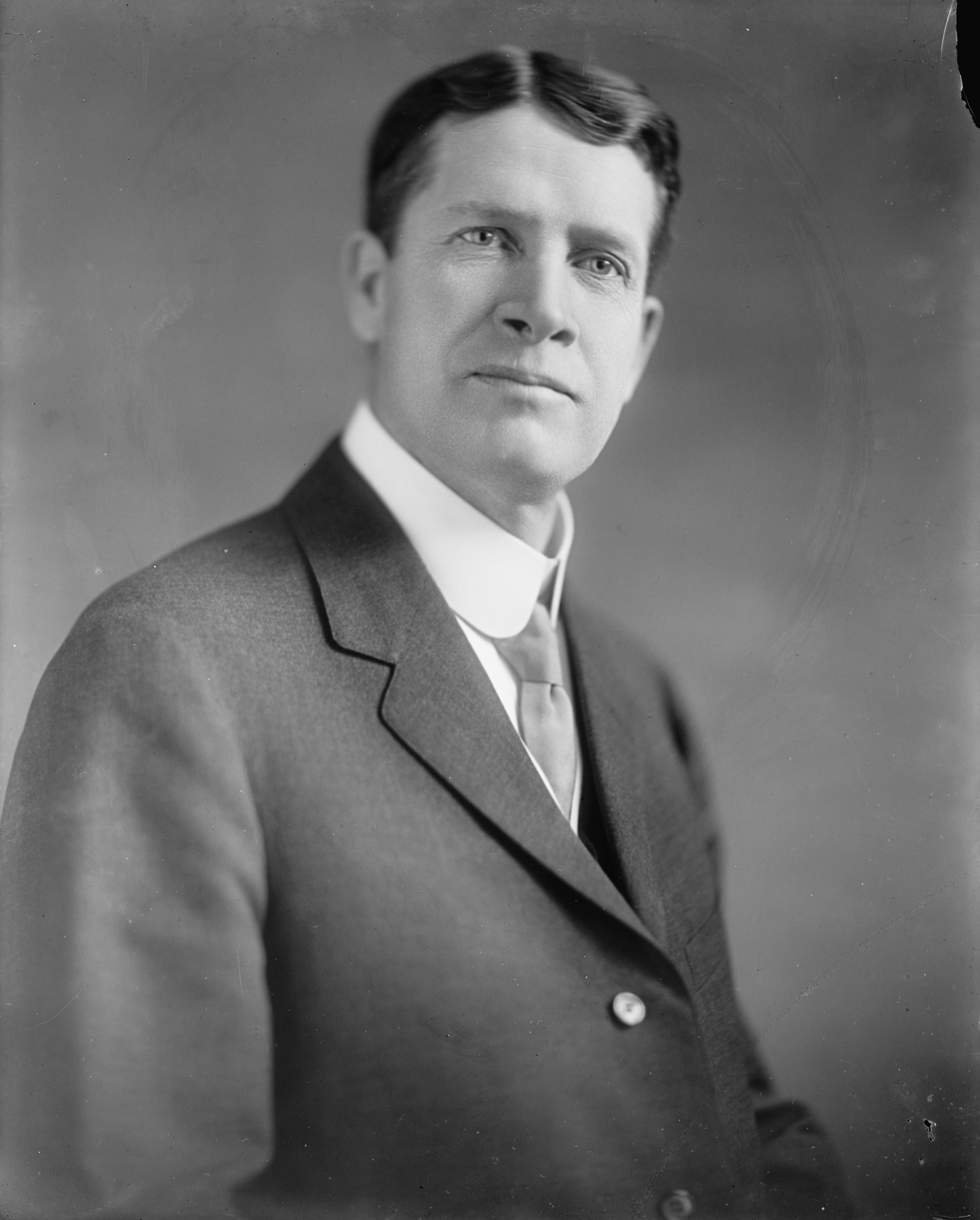
- Portrait by Harris & Ewing c. 1913–1924

Presiding Judge of the United States Customs Court
- In office March 31, 1932 – May 27, 1932
- Preceded by: Israel F. Fischer
- Succeeded by: William Josiah Tilson

Judge of the United States Customs Court
- In office May 28, 1926 – May 27, 1932
- Appointed by: operation of law
- Preceded by: Seat established by 44 Stat. 669
- Succeeded by: William John Keefe

Member of the Board of General Appraisers
- In office May 24, 1924 – May 28, 1926
- Appointed by: Calvin Coolidge
- Preceded by: Eugene Gano Hay
- Succeeded by: Seat abolished

Member of the U.S. House of Representatives from North Dakota's 2nd district
- In office March 4, 1913 – September 2, 1924
- Preceded by: Seat established
- Succeeded by: Thomas Hall

Personal details
- Born: George Morley Young; December 11, 1870 Lakelet, Ontario, Canada
- Died: May 27, 1932 (aged 61) New York City, New York, U.S.
- Resting place: Woodbine Cemetery; Valley City, North Dakota
- Party: Republican
- Education: University of Minnesota Law School (LL.B.)

George Morley Young (December 11, 1870 – May 27, 1932) was a United States representative from North Dakota and a judge of the United States Customs Court.

== Early life and education ==
Young was born on December 11, 1870, in Lakelet, Ontario, Canada. While he was a boy, his family moved to the United States and settled in St. Charles, Michigan. He attended the public schools and received a Bachelor of Laws degree from the University of Minnesota Law School in 1894. He was admitted to the bar the same year and commenced practice in Valley City, North Dakota. He served as member of the board of aldermen for Valley City from 1898 to 1899. He served as member of the North Dakota House of Representatives from 1900 to 1902. He served in the North Dakota Senate from 1904 to 1908 and was President pro Tempore during the entire term.

== Congressional service ==
Young was elected as a Republican to the United States House of Representatives of the 63rd United States Congress and to the five succeeding Congresses and served from March 4, 1913, to September 2, 1924, when he resigned to accept a judicial position. He was endorsed by the Nonpartisan League in 1918, although he was not a member himself. In 1920 and 1922, he was endorsed by the Nonpartisan League's opposition, the Independent Voters Association.

== Federal Judicial Service ==
Young was nominated by President Calvin Coolidge on May 19, 1924, to serve as a Member of the Board of General Appraisers, to the seat vacated by Member Eugene Gano Hay. He was confirmed by the United States Senate on May 23, 1924, and received his commission on May 24, 1924. Young was reassigned by operation of law to serve as an Associate Justice (Judge from June 17, 1930) of the United States Customs Court on May 28, 1926, to a new seat authorized by 44 Stat. 669. He served as Presiding Judge in 1932. His service terminated on May 27, 1932, due to his death in New York City, New York. He was succeeded by Judge William John Keefe. He was interred in Woodbine Cemetery in Valley City.

== Sources ==
- "George M. Young". Biographical Directory of the United States Congress.

U.S. House of Representatives
Preceded by Henry Thomas Helgesen	Member of the U.S. House of Representatives from North Dakota's 2nd congressional district 1913–1924	Succeeded by Thomas Hall
Preceded by Eugene Gano Hay	Member of the Board of General Appraisers; 1924–1926	Succeeded by Seat abolished
Preceded by Seat established by 44 Stat. 669	Judge of the United States Customs Court; 1926–1932	Succeeded by William John Keefe
Preceded by Israel F. Fischer	Presiding Judge of the United States Customs Court; 1932	Succeeded by William Josiah Tilson
