= M. Miller Baker =

American judge (born 1962)

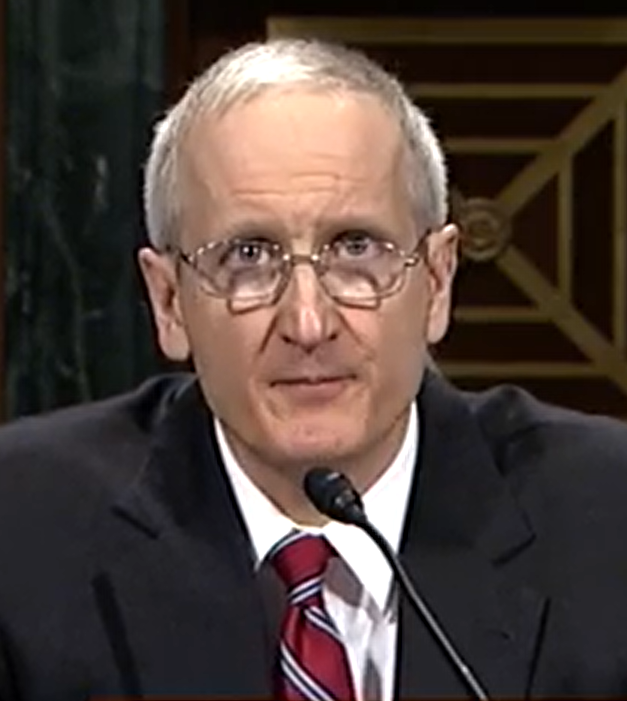

Judge of the United States Court of International Trade
- Incumbent
- Assumed office December 18, 2019
- Appointed by: Donald Trump
- Preceded by: Donald C. Pogue

Personal details
- Born: 1962 (age 63–64) Houma, Louisiana, U.S.
- Party: Republican
- Education: Louisiana State University; Tulane University (JD)

Military service
- Allegiance: United States
- Branch/service: United States Navy
- Years of service: 1986–1994
- Unit: United States Naval Reserve

Maurice Miller Baker (born 1962) is a United States judge of the United States Court of International Trade.

== Education and military service ==
Baker attended Louisiana State University and earned his Juris Doctor from Tulane University Law School. From 1986 to 1994, Baker served as a Naval Reserve intelligence officer in the Selected Reserve and earned an Honorable Discharge.

== Legal career ==
After graduating from law school, Baker served as a law clerk to Judge John M. Duhé Jr. of the United States District Court for the Western District of Louisiana and Judge Thomas Gibbs Gee of the United States Court of Appeals for the Fifth Circuit.

Baker then worked at the United States Department of Justice as an attorney-advisor in the Office of Legal Policy and as a special assistant to the United States Assistant Attorney General for Civil Rights. From 1989 to 1991, he practiced as an associate at Myerson & Kuhn, Dilworth Paxson, and Carr Goodson & Lee in successive periods. From 1991 to 1993, Baker served as counsel to Senator Orrin Hatch on the United States Senate Committee on the Judiciary. He then returned to Carr Maloney, where he became a partner in 1996. From 2000 to 2019 he served as a litigation partner and co-chair of the appellate practice group in the Washington, D.C., office of McDermott Will & Emery. As an appellate attorney, he argued appeals in the Supreme Court of the United States and nine of the thirteen federal courts of appeals. As a trial attorney, he appeared in state and federal trial courts in seventeen states and the District of Columbia.

== Trade Court service ==
On June 7, 2018, President Trump announced his intent to nominate Baker to serve as a United States judge of the United States Court of International Trade. On June 18, 2018, his nomination was sent to the Senate. President Trump nominated Baker to the seat vacated by Judge Donald C. Pogue, who assumed senior status on July 1, 2014. On November 28, 2018, a hearing on his nomination was held before the Senate Judiciary Committee. On January 3, 2019, his nomination was returned to the President under Rule XXXI, Paragraph 6 of the United States Senate. On January 23, 2019, President Trump announced his intent to renominate Baker for a federal judgeship. His nomination was sent to the Senate later that day. On February 7, 2019, his nomination was reported out of committee by a 13–9 vote. On August 1, 2019, his nomination was confirmed by a voice vote. He received his judicial commission on December 18, 2019.

== Affiliations and memberships ==
Baker has been a member of the Federalist Society since 1985.

Legal offices
Preceded by Donald C. Pogue	Judge of the United States Court of International Trade; 2019–present	Incumbent
