= James L. Watson United States Court of International Trade Building =

Federal courthouse in Manhattan, New York

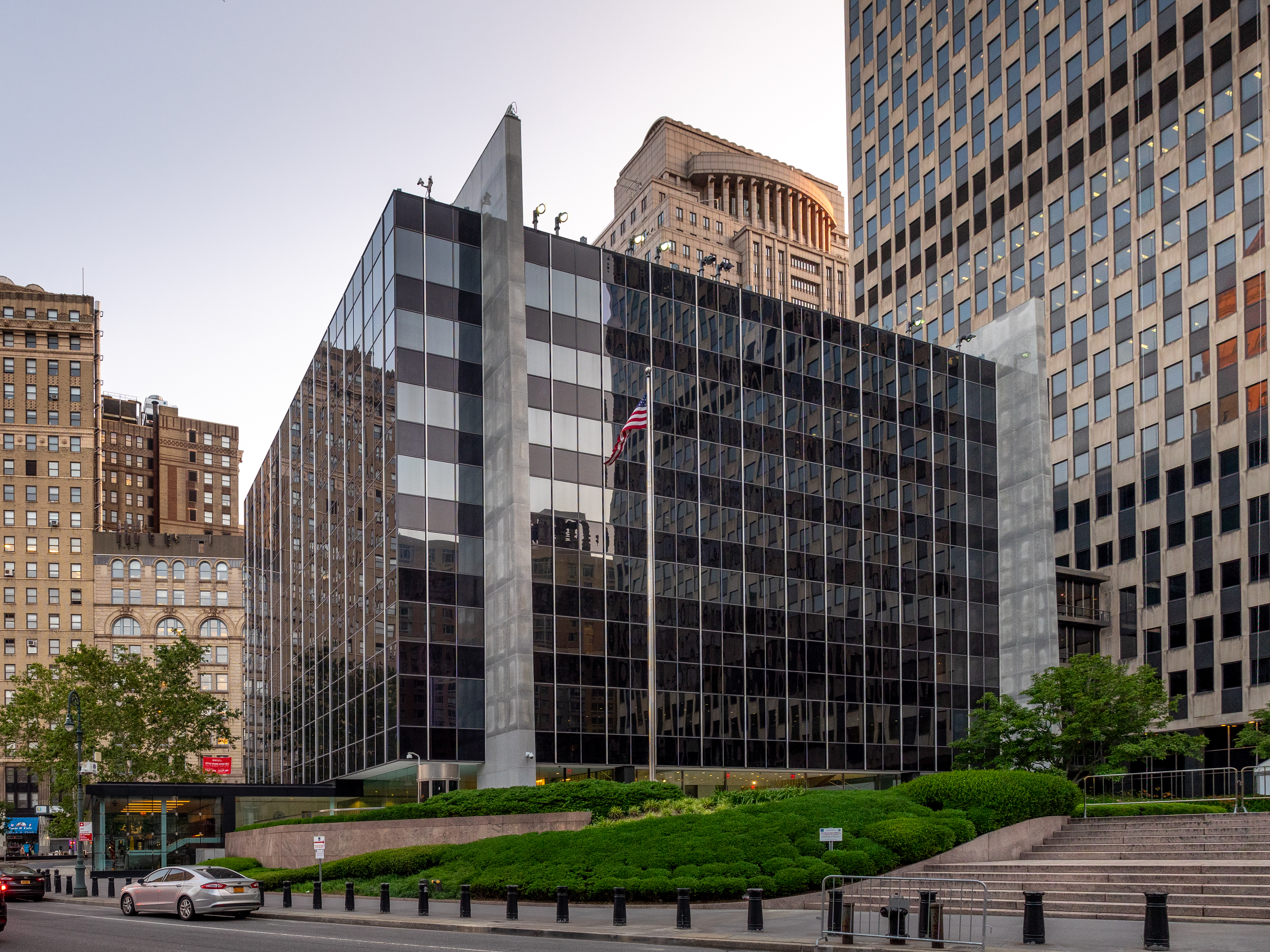
- The building in 2019

General information
- Architectural style: Modern
- Location: One Federal Plaza; New York, NY, United States
- Coordinates: 40°42′54″N 74°0′13″W
- Current tenants: United States Court of International Trade
- Named for: James Lopez Watson
- Year built: 1963-1967, 1973-1974
- Owner: United States Federal Government

Technical details
- Material: Steel, glass, limestone, and granite
- Floor count: 8

Design and construction
- Architecture firm: Alfred Easton Poor; Kahn & Jacobs; Eggers & Higgins

The James L. Watson U.S. Court of International Trade Building is the courthouse of the United States Court of International Trade. Located on Foley Square in lower Manhattan in New York City, it is also known as 1 Federal Plaza, and was built in 1968 adjacent to the Jacob K. Javits Federal Building. In 2003, the building was renamed in honor of James Lopez Watson, a judge of the United States Customs Court from 1964 to 1980, and of the Court of International Trade from 1980 to 2001.

== Building history ==
In November 1958, the U.S. General Services Administration (GSA) announced that it had selected a site west of Foley Square in lower Manhattan for the largest federal building outside of the District of Columbia area. The proposed complex, which required the demolition of about 25 smaller buildings, was part of a larger redevelopment program that reshaped lower Manhattan during the 1950s and 1960s. As chairman of the Downtown-Lower Manhattan Association, David Rockefeller led the effort to reinforce the area as New York's financial and government center. This skyward advance culminated in the completion of the World Trade Center in the 1970s.

Three architectural firms, Alfred Easton Poor, Kahn & Jacobs, and Eggers & Higgins, joined forces to design the complex. The government approved the design, which consisted of a 41-story office tower next to an 8-story court building, in 1960. Construction began in 1963 amid protests from the local architectural community that the complex would crowd Foley Square and negatively impact plans for the Civic Center area. The project proceeded, however, and construction was completed in 1967.

While critics did not consider the large complex a positive addition to New York City from an architectural design perspective, the GSA asserts that it "very efficiently serves the needs of local citizens and federal employees, many of whom previously worked in leased office space throughout the city".

The complex was named for James Lopez Watson (1922–2001), a senior federal judge who was the first African American to serve on the U.S. Customs Court, now known as the U.S. Court of International Trade.

== Architecture ==
The building is located in downtown Manhattan within the New York Civic Center; the complete federal site is bounded by Broadway and Duane, Lafayette, and Worth streets and is adjacent to the African Burial Ground National Monument. Other government buildings in the vicinity include the Daniel Patrick Moynihan U.S. Courthouse, Thurgood Marshall U.S. Courthouse, Ted Weiss Federal Building, New York County Courthouse, New York Supreme Court, and New York City Hall. The neighboring Javits building is a tall office tower, and the eight-story Watson U.S. Court of International Trade Building, commonly referred to as CIT, is linked to the Javits building by a four-story pedestrian bridge. Foley Square Plaza unites the complex of interconnected buildings.

The building is a sleek cube sheathed in black glass. The building is traversed at two points by nonstructural granite buttresses that extend beyond the profile of the black glass walls and flat roof. The upper stories are supported on piers with the street-level entrance recessed behind the arcade. Interior public spaces have terrazzo flooring. Other high-quality finishes include marble and wood-panel walls in the courtrooms and mosaic-tile walls in the elevator lobbies.

When the complex was constructed, the GSA did not fund any public art for the plaza because of changing agency policies and prohibitive inflation. However, in 1979, GSA allocated funds for renowned artist Richard Serra to create a sculpture for the corner site adjacent to the complex. Serra unveiled Tilted Arc, a 120-by-12-foot (36.6 by 3.7 m) curving, raw-steel wall, in 1981. Criticized for aesthetic reasons, potential security hazards, and for bisecting the plaza, the sculpture was removed in 1989 amid much controversy. The situation led to the creation of the Visual Artists Rights Act of 1990 (VARA), which protects works of art and the rights of artists who create them.

After Tilted Arc was removed, GSA retained award-winning landscape architect Martha Schwartz to redesign Foley Square Plaza. Completed in 1997, the plaza is an open space with distinctive features such as the six-foot (1.8 m) tall, grassy hemispherical topiaries. Hand rails with spiral designs run along the stairs leading from the street level to the plaza. Schwartz used bright colors in components of her design, such as green curvilinear benches placed in a serpentine pattern around the topiaries and orange mesh trashcans.

Prominent works of modern art are located throughout the complex, with two significant pieces located in the CIT itself; Seymour Fogel's colorful geometric mosaic Metropolis (1967) is in the lobby and Eagle/Justice Above All Else (1970) by Theodore Roszak is in one of the courtrooms.

== Significant events ==
- 1963-1967: Complex constructed
- 1973-1974: Federal Building West Annex constructed
- 1981: Tilted Arc installed
- 1989: Tilted Arc removed
- 1997: Foley Square Plaza redesigned
- 2003: U.S. Court of International Trade Building renamed in honor of James L. Watson
