= George C. Tichenor =

American judge (1838–1902)

President of the Board of General Appraisers
- In office 1890–1897
- Preceded by: Office established
- Succeeded by: Charles H. Ham

Member of the Board of General Appraisers
- In office July 16, 1890 – July 11, 1902
- Appointed by: Benjamin Harrison
- Preceded by: Seat established by 26 Stat. 131
- Succeeded by: Eugene Gano Hay

Personal details
- Born: George Carter Tichenor; October 8, 1838 Shelbyville, Kentucky, U.S.
- Died: July 11, 1902 (aged 63) East Orange, New Jersey, U.S.
- Resting place: Rosedale Cemetery

George Carter Tichenor (October 8, 1838 – July 11, 1902) was a member and president of the Board of General Appraisers.

== Education and career ==
George Carter Tichenor was born on October 8, 1838, in Shelbyville, Kentucky. He served as a clerk for the United States District Court for the District of Iowa from 1859 to 1861. He served as a colonel in the United States Army from 1862 to 1866. He served as postmaster of Des Moines, Iowa from 1867 to 1872. He served as a special agent of the United States Department of the Treasury from 1871 to 1889. He served as a special agent for the Port of Philadelphia for the Treasury Department from 1878 to 1879. He served as assistant secretary of the Treasury in Washington, D.C. from 1889 to 1890.

== Federal judicial service ==
Tichenor was nominated by President Benjamin Harrison on July 2, 1890, to the Board of General Appraisers, to a new seat created by 26 Stat. 131. He was confirmed by the United States Senate on July 16, 1890, and received his commission the same day. He served as president from 1890 to 1897. His service terminated on July 11, 1902, due to his death in East Orange, New Jersey. He was succeeded by Eugene Gano Hay.

Legal offices
Preceded by Seat established by 26 Stat. 131	Member of the Board of General Appraisers; 1890–1902	Succeeded by Eugene Gano Hay
Preceded by Office established	President of the Board of General Appraisers; 1890–1897	Succeeded by Charles H. Ham
