= Eugene Gano Hay =

American politician (1853–1933)

Member of the Board of General Appraisers
- In office September 21, 1903 – November 30, 1923
- Appointed by: Theodore Roosevelt
- Preceded by: George C. Tichenor
- Succeeded by: George M. Young

Personal details
- Born: Eugene Gano Hay; March 26, 1853 Charlestown, Indiana
- Died: February 21, 1933 (aged 79) Summit, New Jersey
- Education: read law

Eugene Gano Hay (March 26, 1853 – February 21, 1933) was a member of the Board of General Appraisers.

== Education and career ==
Born on March 26, 1853, in Charlestown, Indiana, Hay read law and entered private practice in Madison, Indiana from 1877 to 1880. He was prosecuting attorney for Jefferson County and Switzerland County, Indiana from 1881 to 1885. Hay resumed private practice in Minneapolis, Minnesota from 1886 to 1889. He was a member of the Minnesota House of Representatives in 1889, and was United States Attorney for the District of Minnesota from 1890 to 1894. In 1894 he resumed private practice in Minneapolis, which he continued until 1903.

== Federal judicial service ==
Hay received a recess appointment from President Theodore Roosevelt on September 21, 1903, to a seat on the Board of General Appraisers vacated by Member George C. Tichenor. He was nominated to the same position by President Roosevelt on November 10, 1903. He was confirmed by the United States Senate on November 24, 1903, and received his commission on November 25, 1903. His service terminated on November 30, 1923, due to his retirement. He was succeeded by George M. Young.

== Death ==
Hay died on February 21, 1933, in Summit, New Jersey.

Legal offices
Preceded by George C. Tichenor	Member of the Board of General Appraisers; 1903–1923	Succeeded by George M. Young
