= Israel F. Fischer =

American politician (1858-1940)

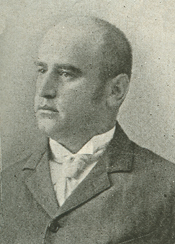

Presiding Judge of the United States Customs Court
- In office 1927–1932
- Preceded by: William Barberie Howell
- Succeeded by: George M. Young

Judge of the United States Customs Court
- In office May 28, 1926 – March 31, 1932
- Appointed by: operation of law
- Preceded by: Seat established by 44 Stat. 669
- Succeeded by: Frederick W. Dallinger

President of the Board of General Appraisers
- In office 1902–1905
- Preceded by: Charles H. Ham
- Succeeded by: Marion De Vries

Member of the Board of General Appraisers
- In office May 9, 1899 – May 28, 1926
- Appointed by: William McKinley
- Preceded by: Ferdinand N. Shurtleff
- Succeeded by: Seat abolished

Member of the U.S. House of Representatives from New York's 4th district
- In office March 4, 1895 – March 3, 1899
- Preceded by: William J. Coombs
- Succeeded by: Bertram Tracy Clayton

Personal details
- Born: Israel Frederick Fischer; August 17, 1858 New York City, New York, U.S.
- Died: March 16, 1940 (aged 81) New York City, New York, U.S.
- Resting place: Maimonides Cemetery; Brooklyn, New York
- Party: Republican
- Education: Attended Cooper Union; read law

Israel Frederick Fischer (August 17, 1858 – March 16, 1940) was a United States representative from New York, a judge and Presiding Judge of the United States Customs Court and a member and President of the Board of General Appraisers.

== Education and career ==
Born on August 17, 1858, in New York City, New York, Fischer attended the public schools and Cooper Institute (now Cooper Union) in New York City and moved to Brooklyn, New York in September 1887. He was employed as a clerk in a law office, where he read law and was admitted to the bar in 1879. He entered private practice in New York City from 1880 to 1895. He was a member of the executive committee of the Republican state committee from 1888 to 1890.

== Congressional service ==
Fischer was elected as a Republican from New York's 4th congressional district to the United States House of Representatives of the 54th and 55th United States Congresses, serving from March 4, 1895, to March 3, 1899. He was an unsuccessful candidate for reelection in 1898 to the 56th United States Congress.

== Federal judicial service ==
Fischer received a recess appointment from President William McKinley on May 2, 1899, to a seat on the Board of General Appraisers vacated by member Ferdinand N. Shurtleff. He was nominated to the same position by President McKinley on December 15, 1899. He was confirmed by the United States Senate on January 17, 1900, and received his commission on January 22, 1900. He served as President from 1902 to 1905. Fischer was reassigned by operation of law to the United States Customs Court on May 28, 1926, to a new Associate Justice seat (Judge from June 17, 1930) authorized by 44 Stat. 669. He served as Chief Justice (Presiding Judge from June 17, 1930) from 1927 to 1932. His service terminated on March 31, 1932, due to his retirement. He was succeeded by Judge Frederick W. Dallinger.

== Other service and death ==
Fischer was a delegate to the International Customs Congress held in New York City in 1903. He died on March 16, 1940, in New York City. He was interred in Maimonides Cemetery in Brooklyn.

== See also ==
- List of Jewish members of the United States Congress

== Sources ==
- "Israel F. Fischer". Biographical Directory of the United States Congress.

U.S. House of Representatives
Preceded by William J. Coombs	Member of the U.S. House of Representatives from New York's 4th congressional district 1895–1899	Succeeded by Bertram Tracy Clayton
Legal offices
Preceded by Ferdinand N. Shurtleff	Member of the Board of General Appraisers; 1899–1926	Succeeded by Seat abolished
Preceded by Charles H. Ham	President of the Board of General Appraisers; 1902–1905	Succeeded by Marion De Vries
Preceded by Seat established by 44 Stat. 669	Judge of the United States Customs Court; 1926–1932	Succeeded by Frederick W. Dallinger
Preceded by William Barberie Howell	Presiding Judge of the United States Customs Court; 1927–1932	Succeeded by George M. Young
