= Clearbranch, Tennessee =

- Unincorporated community
- Location within Tennessee Location within the United States
- Coordinates: 36°03′15″N 82°30′59″W
- Country: United States
- State: Tennessee
- County: Unicoi
- Elevation: 2,224 ft (678 m)
- Time zone: UTC-5 (Eastern (EST))
  - Summer (DST): UTC-4 (EDT)
- Area code: 423
- GNIS feature ID: 1327930

Clearbranch (also Clear Branch) is an unincorporated community in Unicoi County, Tennessee, United States.

== Notable people ==
- John Q. Tilson (1866–1958), major in the Spanish–American War, represented Connecticut in the United States House of Representatives for almost 22 years, and was House Majority leader for six years.
- William Josiah Tilson (1871–1949), United States Federal Court judge, was born in Clear Branch.
