= R. Kenton Musgrave =

American judge (1927–2023)

Senior Judge of the United States Court of International Trade
- In office November 14, 1997 – March 14, 2023

Judge of the United States Court of International Trade
- In office November 9, 1987 – November 14, 1997
- Appointed by: Ronald Reagan
- Preceded by: Morgan Ford
- Succeeded by: Richard K. Eaton

Personal details
- Born: Raymond Kenton Musgrove; September 7, 1927 Clearwater, Florida, U.S.
- Died: March 14, 2023 (aged 95)
- Spouse: Ruth Shippen Hoppe
- Education: University of Washington (BA); Emory University (JD)

Raymond Kenton Musgrave (September 7, 1927 – March 14, 2023) was a United States judge of the United States Court of International Trade.

== Education and career ==
Musgrave was born in 1927 in Clearwater, Florida. From 1945 to 1946, he attended the Georgia Institute of Technology and from 1946 to 1947, he attended the University of Florida. He received a Bachelor of Arts degree in 1948 from the University of Washington. He received a Juris Doctor in 1953 from Emory University School of Law. He served as assistant general counsel for Lockheed Aircraft and Lockheed International from 1953 to 1962. He served as vice president and general counsel of Mattel Inc. from 1963 to 1971. He was director of Ringling Brothers and Barnum & Bailey Combined Shows, Inc. from 1968 to 1972. He worked in private practice from 1972 to 1975. He served as assistant general counsel for Pacific Enterprises from 1975 to 1981. He served as vice president, general counsel and secretary of Vivitar Corporation from 1981 to 1985. He served as vice president and director of Santa Barbara Applied Research Corp. from 1982 to 1987.

While in college, he served two years in the Reserve Officers Training Corps but saw no military service.

== Trade Court service ==
On July 1, 1987, President Ronald Reagan nominated Musgrave to serve as a judge of the United States Court of International Trade, to the seat vacated by Judge Morgan Ford. He was confirmed by the United States Senate on November 6, 1987, and received his commission on November 9, 1987. He took senior status on November 14, 1997. His service ended on March 14, 2023, when he died, aged 95.

Legal offices
Preceded by Morgan Ford	Judge of the United States Court of International Trade; 1987–1997	Succeeded by Richard K. Eaton
