= Richard K. Eaton =

American judge (born 1948)

Senior Judge of the United States Court of International Trade
- Incumbent
- Assumed office August 22, 2014

Judge of the United States Court of International Trade
- In office October 26, 1999 – August 22, 2014
- Appointed by: Bill Clinton
- Preceded by: R. Kenton Musgrave
- Succeeded by: Timothy M. Reif

Personal details
- Born: 1948 (age 77–78) Walton, New York, U.S.
- Education: Ithaca College (BA); Albany Law School (JD)

Richard Kenyon Eaton (born 1948) is a Senior United States Judge of the United States Court of International Trade.

== Biography ==
Eaton was born in 1948, in Walton, New York. He received a Bachelor of Arts degree in 1970, from Ithaca College. He received a Juris Doctor in 1974, from Albany Law School. He worked in private practice in Cooperstown, New York from 1974 to 1975 and then in Walton from 1975 to 1977. He served in turn as regional director, legislative director and Chief of Staff for Senator Daniel Patrick Moynihan, from 1977 to 1983, serving in both New York City and Washington, D.C. He served in private practice in New York City from 1983 to 1991. He again served as Chief of Staff to Senator Moynihan from 1991 to 1993. He returned to private practice in Washington, D.C. from 1993 to 1999.

== Trade Court service ==
On August 3, 1999, President Bill Clinton nominated Eaton to be a United States Judge of the United States Court of International Trade, to the seat vacated by Judge R. Kenton Musgrave. He was confirmed by the Senate on October 22, 1999 and received his commission on October 26, 1999. He took senior status on August 22, 2014.

== Personal life ==
Eaton is married to museum director Susan Henshaw Jones.

Legal offices
Preceded by R. Kenton Musgrave	Judge of the United States Court of International Trade; 1999–2014	Succeeded by Timothy M. Reif
