= United States Court of International Trade =

US court dealing with international trade and customs law

Coordinates: 40°42′54″N 74°0′13″W

- (Ct. Int'l Trade or CIT)
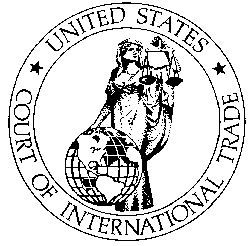
- Location: James L. Watson United States Court of International Trade Building; 1 Federal Plaza; New York, NY 10278; United States
- Appeals to: Federal Circuit
- Established: December 18, 1980; 45 years ago
- Authority: Article III court
- Created by: 28 U.S.C. §§ 251–258
- Composition method: Presidential nomination with Senate advice and consent
- Judges: 9
- Judge term length: Life tenure
- Chief Judge: Mark A. Barnett
- cit.uscourts.gov

The United States Court of International Trade (case citations: Ct. Int'l Trade; also abbreviated as CIT) is a United States federal court that adjudicates civil actions arising out of United States customs and international trade laws. Seated in Lower Manhattan, New York City, the court exercises broad jurisdiction over most trade-related matters and is permitted to hear and adjudicate cases originating anywhere in the United States as well as internationally.

The court originated with the Customs Administrative Act of 1890, which established the Board of General Appraisers as a quasi-judicial entity of the United States Department of the Treasury to hear disputes primarily concerning tariffs and import duties. In 1926, Congress replaced the Board with the United States Customs Court, an administrative tribunal with greater judicial functions, which in 1930 was made independent of the Treasury Department. In 1956, the United States Customs Court was reconstituted by Congress as an Article III tribunal, giving it the status and privileges of a federal court. The Customs Courts Act of 1980 established the United States Court of International Trade in its current form, granting it jurisdiction over all trade matters and conferring its judges with life tenure.

The court's subject matter jurisdiction is limited to particular questions in international trade and customs law, though it may also decide any civil action against the United States government, its officers, or its agencies arising out of any law connected to international trade. As an Article III tribunal, the United States Court of International Trade can decide controversies in both law and equity, and is thus allowed to grant relief in virtually all means available, including money judgments, writs of mandamus, and preliminary or permanent injunctions.

Led by a chief judge, the CIT is composed of nine judges appointed by the United States president and confirmed by the United States Senate. No more than five judges can be of the same political party. Cases are typically heard by just one judge, although trials involving potential constitutional issues or broad legal implications for customs laws may be decided by a three-judge panel. The court operates on procedures and protocols drawn heavily from the Federal Rules of Civil Procedure.

== History ==
In 1890, the United States Congress passed legislation creating the Board of General Appraisers, a quasi-judicial administrative unit within the United States Department of the Treasury. The Board had nine members appointed by the President of the United States and empowered to review decisions of United States Customs officials concerning the amount of duties to be paid on importations.

In 1926, Congress responded to the increasing number and complexity of customs cases by replacing the Board of General Appraisers with the United States Customs Court, an independent Article I tribunal, retaining the jurisdiction and powers of the Board of General Appraisers. In 1928, the United States Customs Court became the first federal tribunal in the United States to have a woman judge, when President Calvin Coolidge nominated Genevieve R. Cline to the court. Although many members of the United States Senate objected to Cline's appointment, both because of her sex, and because they believed she was self-taught and had no judicial experience, her supporters advocated strongly for her, including Katherine Pike, president of the National Association of Women Lawyers and a number of club-women. Cline won U.S. Senate confirmation on May 25, 1928, received her commission on May 26, 1928, and took her oath of office in the Cleveland Federal Building on June 5, 1928.

On July 14, 1956, Congress made the United States Customs Court an Article III tribunal, again without changing its jurisdiction, powers, or procedures. After making some procedural changes in the Customs Courts Act of 1970, Congress addressed substantive issues concerning the court's jurisdiction and remedial powers in the Customs Courts Act of 1980, which broadened the power of the court and renamed it the United States Court of International Trade.

On May 28, 2025, a three-judge panel of the court ruled in V.O.S. Selections, Inc. v. United States that President Donald Trump overstepped his authority by using the 1977 International Emergency Economic Powers Act (IEEPA) to justify sweeping tariff hikes under his Liberation Day trade policy. The court held that the IEEPA does not grant presidents the power to impose such broad import taxes. The judges also struck down a separate set of tariffs the Trump administration had levied on China, Mexico, and Canada, which had been justified as a response to drug trafficking and illegal immigration. The court found that these measures exceeded executive authority.

== Courthouse ==
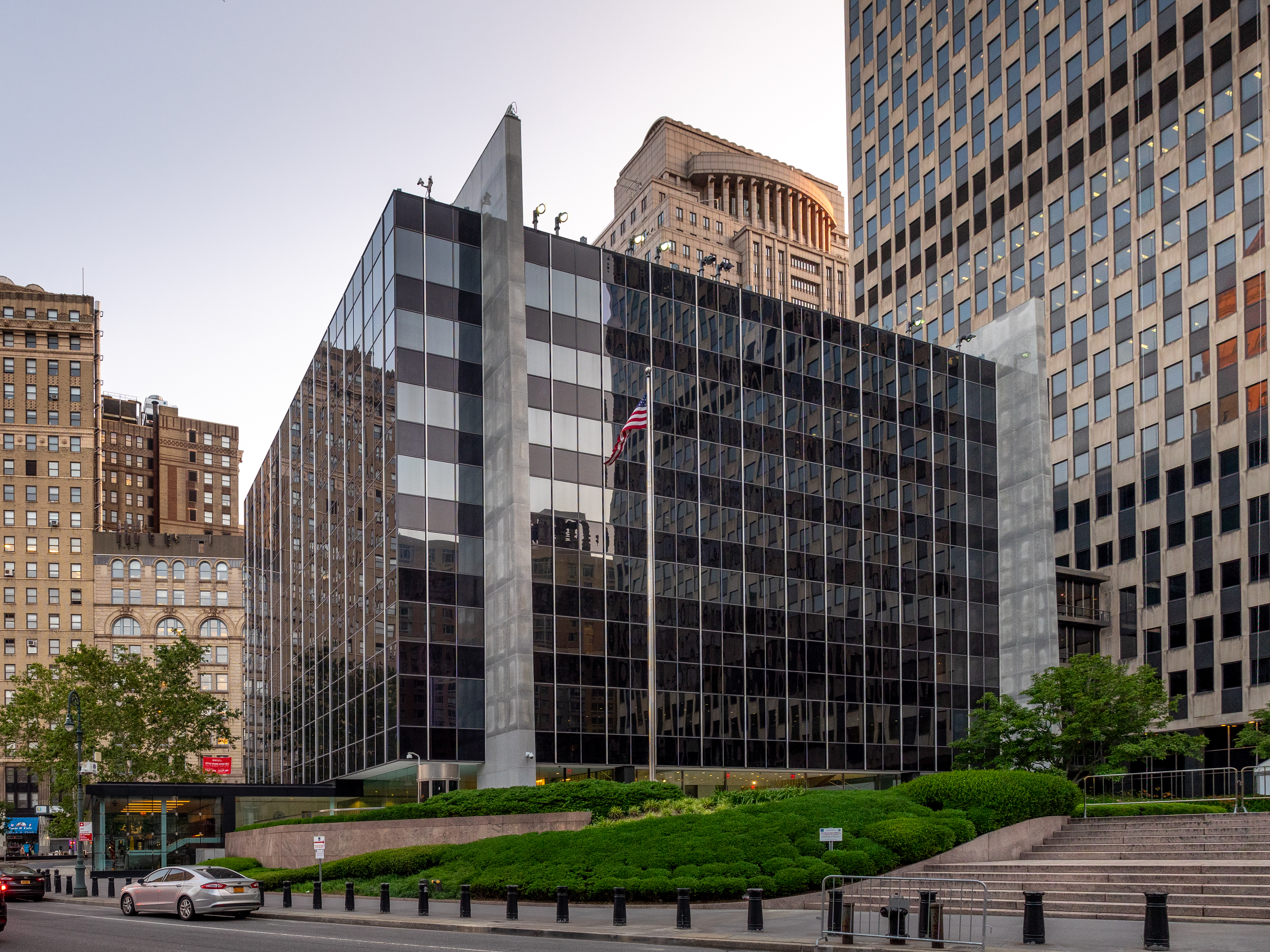
The James L. Watson Court of International Trade Building on Foley Square

The James L. Watson Court of International Trade Building, located on Foley Square in lower Manhattan in New York City, houses the court. Also known as 1 Federal Plaza, it was built in 1968 adjacent to the Jacob K. Javits Federal Building. In 2003, the building was named in honor of James L. Watson, a judge of the United States Customs Court from 1964 to 1980, and of the Court of International Trade from 1980 to 2001.

== Jurisdiction ==
The court possesses limited subject matter jurisdiction, meaning that it may hear only cases involving particular international trade and customs law questions. For example, the court hears disputes such as those involving protests filed with U.S. Customs and Border Protection, decisions regarding Trade Adjustment Assistance by the United States Department of Labor or United States Department of Agriculture, customs broker licensing, and disputes relating to determinations made by the United States International Trade Commission and the Department of Commerce's International Trade Administration regarding anti-dumping and countervailing duties.

There is one notable exception to the court's jurisdiction. In cases involving antidumping and countervailing duties imposed on Canadian or Mexican merchandise, an interested party can request that the case be heard before a special ad hoc binational panel organized under Chapter 19 of the 1994 North American Free Trade Agreement.

== Procedure ==
Most cases are heard by a single judge. If a case challenges the constitutionality of a U.S. law or has important implications regarding the administration or interpretation of the customs laws, then it may be heard by a three-judge panel. Many Judges of the Court of International Trade also regularly sit by designation on three-judge panels of the United States courts of appeals.

Although the Court maintains its own rules of procedure, they are patterned for the most part on the Federal Rules of Civil Procedure. The court has held that decisions interpreting the Federal Rules of Civil Procedure are "instructive" in interpreting its own rules.

== Current composition of the court ==
As of August 10, 2026:

#	Title	Judge	Duty station	Born	Term of service			Appointed by
#	Title	Judge	Duty station	Born	Active	Chief	Senior	Appointed by
24	Chief Judge	Mark A. Barnett	New York City	1963	2013–present (Note: By virtue of his seniority of age, Judge Barnett holds seniority over Judge Kelly despite their identical commission dates.)	2021–present	—	Obama
25	Judge	Claire R. Kelly	New York City	1965	2013–present	—	—	Obama
26	Judge	Jennifer Choe-Groves	New York City	1969	2016–present	—	—	Obama
27	Judge	Gary Katzmann	New York City	1953	2016–present	—	—	Obama
28	Judge	Timothy M. Reif	New York City	1959	2019–present	—	—	Trump
29	Judge	M. Miller Baker	New York City	1962	2019–present	—	—	Trump
31	Judge	Lisa Wen-Jia Wang	New York City	1980	2024–present	—	—	Biden
32	Judge	Joseph A. Laroski	New York City	1971	2024–present	—	—	Biden
33	Judge	Kara Westercamp	New York City	1982	2026–present	—	—	Trump
11	Senior Judge	Jane A. Restani	New York City	1948	1983–2015	2003–2010	2015–present	Reagan
13	Senior Judge	Thomas J. Aquilino	inactive	1939	1985–2004	—	2004–present	Reagan
19	Senior Judge	Judith Barzilay	inactive	1944	1998–2011	—	2011–present	Clinton
20	Senior Judge	Delissa A. Ridgway	inactive	1955	1998–2019	—	2019–present	Clinton
21	Senior Judge	Richard K. Eaton	New York City	1948	1999–2014	—	2014–present	Clinton
22	Senior Judge	Timothy C. Stanceu	New York City	1951	2003–2021	2014–2021	2021–present	G.W. Bush
23	Senior Judge	Leo M. Gordon	New York City	1952	2006–2019	—	2019–present	G.W. Bush

== Former judges of the United States Court of International Trade ==
#	Judge	State	Born–died	Active service	Chief Judge	Senior status	Appointed by	Reason for termination
—	Samuel Rosenstein	—	1909–1995	—	—	1980–1995 (Note: Reassigned from the United States Customs Court.)	L. Johnson / Operation of law	death
1	Paul Peter Rao	—	1899–1988	1980–1988	—	—	Truman / Operation of law	death
2	Morgan Ford	—	1911–1992	1980–1985	—	1985–1992	Truman / Operation of law	death
3	Scovel Richardson	—	1912–1982	1980–1982	—	—	Eisenhower / Operation of law	death
4	Frederick Landis Jr.	—	1912–1990	1980–1983	—	1983–1990	L. Johnson / Operation of law	death
5	James Lopez Watson	—	1922–2001	1980–1991	—	1991–2001	L. Johnson / Operation of law	death
6	Herbert N. Maletz	—	1913–2002	1980–1982	—	1982–2002	L. Johnson / Operation of law	death
7	Bernard Newman	—	1907–1999	1980–1983	—	1983–1999	L. Johnson / Operation of law	death
8	Edward D. Re	—	1920–2006	1980–1991	1980–1991	—	L. Johnson / Operation of law	retirement
9	Nils Boe	—	1913–1992	1980–1984	—	1984–1992	Nixon / Operation of law	death
10	Gregory W. Carman	—	1937–2020	1983–2014	1996–2003	2014–2020	Reagan	death
12	Dominick L. DiCarlo	—	1928–1999	1984–1996	1991–1996	1996–1999	Reagan	death
14	Nicholas Tsoucalas	—	1926–2018	1986–1996	—	1996–2018	Reagan	death
15	R. Kenton Musgrave	CA	1927–2023	1987–1997	—	1997–2023	Reagan	death
16	Richard W. Goldberg	ND	1927–2023	1991–2001	—	2001–2023	G.H.W. Bush	death
17	Donald C. Pogue	CT	1947–2016	1995–2014	2010–2014	2014–2016	Clinton	death
18	Evan Wallach	NV	1949–present	1995–2011	—	—	Clinton	elevation
30	Stephen Vaden	TN	1982–present	2020–2025	—	—	Trump	resignation

== Former judges of the United States Customs Court ==
#	Judge	Born–died	Active service	Chief Judge	Senior status	Appointed by	Reason for termination
1	William Barberie Howell	1865–1927	1926–1927 (Note: Reassigned from the Board of General Appraisers.)	1926–1927	—	McKinley / Operation of law	death
2	Israel F. Fischer	1858–1940	1926–1932	1927–1932	—	McKinley / Operation of law	retirement
3	Byron Sylvester Waite	1852–1930	1926–1930	—	—	T. Roosevelt / Operation of law	retirement
4	Charles Paul McClelland	1854–1944	1926–1939	1934–1939	—	T. Roosevelt / Operation of law	retirement
5	Jerry Sullivan	1859–1948	1926–1939	—	—	Wilson / Operation of law	retirement
6	George Stewart Brown	1871–1941	1926–1941	1939–1940	—	Wilson / Operation of law	retirement
7	William C. Adamson	1854–1929	1926–1928	—	—	Wilson / Operation of law	retirement
8	George Emery Weller	1857–1932	1926–1930	—	—	Wilson / Operation of law	retirement
9	George M. Young	1870–1932	1926–1932	1932	—	Coolidge / Operation of law	death
10	William Josiah Tilson	1871–1949	1928–1949	1932–1934	—	Coolidge	death
11	Genevieve R. Cline	1877–1959	1928–1953	—	—	Coolidge	retirement
12	David Hayes Kincheloe	1877–1950	1930–1948 (Note: Recess appointment; formally nominated on December 4, 1930, confirmed by the United States Senate on January 22, 1931, and received commission on January 29, 1931.)	—	—	Hoover	retirement
13	Walter Howard Evans	1870–1959	1931–1941	—	—	Hoover	retirement
14	Frederick W. Dallinger	1871–1955	1932–1942	—	—	Hoover	retirement
15	William John Keefe	1873–1955	1933–1947	—	—	F. Roosevelt	retirement
16	Thomas Joseph Walker	1877–1945	1940–1945	—	—	F. Roosevelt	death
17	Webster Oliver	1888–1969	1940–1967	1940–1965	1967–1969	F. Roosevelt	death
18	William A. Ekwall	1887–1956	1942–1956	—	—	F. Roosevelt	death
19	William Purington Cole Jr.	1889–1957	1942–1952	—	—	F. Roosevelt	elevation
20	Charles Lawrence	1878–1975	1943–1965	—	1965–1975	F. Roosevelt	death
21	Irvin Charles Mollison	1898–1962	1945–1962	—	—	Truman	death
22	Jed Johnson	1888–1963	1947–1963	—	—	Truman	death
23	Paul Peter Rao	1899–1988	1948–1980 (Note: Recess appointment; formally nominated on June 22, 1948, confirmed by the Senate on January 31, 1949, and received commission on February 2, 1948.)	1965–1971	—	Truman	reassignment
24	Morgan Ford	1911–1992	1949–1980	—	—	Truman	reassignment
25	David John Wilson	1887–1976	1954–1966	—	1966–1976	Eisenhower	death
26	Mary Donlon Alger	1893–1977	1955–1966	—	1966–1977	Eisenhower	death
27	Scovel Richardson	1912–1982	1957–1980	—	—	Eisenhower	reassignment
28	Philip Nichols Jr.	1907–1990	1964–1966	—	—	L. Johnson	elevation
29	Frederick Landis Jr.	1912–1990	1965–1980	—	—	L. Johnson	reassignment
30	James Lopez Watson	1922–2001	1966–1980	—	—	L. Johnson	reassignment
31	Lindley Beckworth	1913–1984	1967–1968	—	—	L. Johnson	resignation
32	Herbert N. Maletz	1913–2002	1967–1980	—	—	L. Johnson	reassignment
33	Bernard Newman	1907–1999	1968–1980	—	—	L. Johnson	reassignment
34	Samuel Rosenstein	1909–1995	1968–1970	—	1970–1980	L. Johnson	reassignment
35	Edward D. Re	1920–2006	1968–1980	1977–1980	—	L. Johnson	reassignment
36	Nils Boe	1913–1992	1971–1980	1971–1977	—	Nixon	reassignment

== Former members of the Board of General Appraisers ==
#	Member	Born/Died	Active service	President	Senior status	Appointed by	Reason for termination
1	Charles H. Ham	1831–1902	1890–1902	1897–1902	—	B. Harrison	resignation
2	George C. Tichenor	1838–1902	1890–1902	1890–1897	—	B. Harrison	death
3	Joseph Biddle Wilkinson Jr.	1845–1915	1890–1899	—	—	B. Harrison	resignation
4	James A. Jewell	c. 1840–1912	1890–1903	—	—	B. Harrison	resignation
5	Henderson M. Somerville	1837–1915	1890–1915	1910–1914	—	B. Harrison	death
6	Ferdinand N. Shurtleff	1837–1903	1890–1899	—	—	B. Harrison	removal (Note: Removed from office by William McKinley.)
7	Joseph Lewis Stackpole	1838–1904	1890–1890	—	—	B. Harrison	resignation
8	Thaddeus S. Sharretts	1850–1926	1890–1913	—	—	B. Harrison	removal (Note: Removed from office by William Howard Taft.)
9	George H. Sharpe	1828–1900	1890–1899	—	—	B. Harrison	resignation
10	Wilbur Fisk Lunt	1848–1908	1891–1908	—	—	B. Harrison	death
11	William Barberie Howell	1865–1927	1899–1926	1925–1926	—	McKinley	reassignment
12	Israel F. Fischer	1858–1940	1899–1926 (Note: Recess appointment; formally nominated on December 15, 1899, confirmed by the United States Senate on January 17, 1900, and received commission on January 22, 1900.)	1902–1905	—	McKinley	reassignment
13	Marion De Vries	1865–1939	1900–1910 (Note: Recess appointment; formally nominated on December 5, 1900, confirmed by the Senate on December 10, 1900, date of commission is unknown.)	1906–1910	—	McKinley	elevation
14	Byron Sylvester Waite	1852–1930	1902–1926	—	—	T. Roosevelt	reassignment
15	Charles P. McClelland	1854–1944	1903–1926 (Note: Recess appointment; formally nominated on November 10, 1903, confirmed by the Senate on December 7, 1903, and received commission on December 8, 1903.)	—	—	T. Roosevelt	reassignment
16	Eugene Gano Hay	1853–1933	1903–1923 (Note: Recess appointment; formally nominated on November 10, 1903, confirmed by the Senate on November 24, 1903, and received commission on November 25, 1903.)	—	—	T. Roosevelt	retirement
17	Roy Chamberlain	1861–1953	1908–1913 (Note: Recess appointment; formally nominated on December 8, 1908, confirmed by the Senate on January 11, 1909, and received commission on January 15, 1909.)	—	—	T. Roosevelt	removal
18	Samuel B. Cooper	1850–1918	1910–1918	—	—	Taft	death
19	Jerry Bartholomew Sullivan	1859–1948	1913–1926	1914–1925	—	Wilson	reassignment
20	George Stewart Brown	1871–1941	1913–1926	—	—	Wilson	reassignment
21	William C. Adamson	1854–1929	1917–1926	—	—	Wilson	reassignment
22	George Emery Weller	1857–1932	1919–1926	—	—	Wilson	reassignment
23	George M. Young	1870–1932	1924–1926	—	—	Coolidge	reassignment

== Chief judges ==
President (Board of General Appraisers)
Tichenor	1890–1897
Ham	1897–1902
Fischer	1902–1905
De Vries	1906–1910
Somerville	1910–1914
Sullivan	1914–1925
Howell	1925–1926

Chief Judge (Customs Court)
Howell	1926–1927
Fischer	1927–1932
Young	1932–1932
Tilson	1932–1934
McClelland	1934–1939
Brown	1939–1940
Oliver	1940–1965
Rao	1965–1971
Boe	1971–1977
Re	1977–1980

Chief Judge (Court of International Trade)
Re	1980–1991
DiCarlo	1991–1996
Carman	1996–2003
Restani	2003–2010
Pogue	2010–2014
Stanceu	2014–2021
Barnett	2021–present

Chief judges have administrative responsibilities with respect to the Court of International Trade, and preside over any panel on which they serve unless circuit judges are also on the panel. Unlike the Supreme Court, where one justice is specifically nominated to be chief, the office of chief judge rotates among the court judges. To be chief, a judge must have been in active service on the court for at least one year, be under the age of 65, and have not previously served as chief judge. A vacancy is filled by the judge highest in seniority among the group of qualified judges. The chief judge serves for a term of seven years or until age 70, whichever occurs first. The age restrictions are waived if no members of the court would otherwise be qualified for the position.

Under the Board of General Appraisers, the position of Chief Judge was entitled "President". When the office was created in 1948, the chief judge was the longest-serving judge who had not elected to retire on what has since 1958 been known as senior status or declined to serve as chief judge. After August 6, 1959, judges could not become or remain chief after turning 70 years old. The current rules have been in operation since October 1, 1982.

== Succession of seats ==
Seat 1
Seat established on June 10, 1890 by 26 Stat. 131, 136
Wilkinson, Jr.	—	1890–1899
De Vries	—	1900–1910
Cooper	—	1910–1918
Weller	—	1919–1930
Kincheloe	—	1930–1948
Rao	—	1948–1988
Goldberg	ND	1991–2001
Stanceu	VA	2003–2021
Laroski	MD	2024–present

Seat 2
Seat established on June 10, 1890 by 26 Stat. 131, 136
Sharpe	—	1890–1899
Howell	—	1899–1927
Tilson	—	1928–1949
Ford	—	1949–1985
Musgrave	CA	1987–1997
Eaton	DC	1999–2014
Reif	DC	2019–present

Seat 3
Seat established on June 10, 1890 by 26 Stat. 131, 136
Ham	—	1890–1902
Waite	—	1902–1930
Evans	—	1931–1941
Ekwall	—	1942–1956
Richardson	—	1957–1982
Carman	—	1983–2014
Choe-Groves	VA	2016–present

Seat 4
Seat established on June 10, 1890 by 26 Stat. 131, 136
Shurtleff	—	1890–1899
Fischer	—	1899–1932
Dallinger	—	1932–1942
Lawrence	—	1943–1965
Landis, Jr.	—	1965–1983
Aquilino, Jr.	—	1985–2004
Gordon	NJ	2006–2019
Wang	DC	2024–present

Seat 5
Seat established on June 10, 1890 by 26 Stat. 131, 136
Tichenor	—	1890–1902
Hay	—	1903–1923
Young	—	1924–1932
Keefe	—	1933–1947
Johnson	—	1947–1963
Watson	—	1966–1991
Pogue	CT	1995–2014
Baker	LA	2019–present

Seat 6
Seat established on June 10, 1890 by 26 Stat. 131, 136
Sharretts	—	1890–1913
Sullivan	—	1913–1939
Walker	—	1940–1945
Mollison	—	1945–1962
Nichols, Jr.	—	1964–1966
Maletz	—	1967–1982
Restani	—	1983–2015
Katzmann	MA	2016–present

Seat 7
Seat established on June 10, 1890 by 26 Stat. 131, 136
Somerville	—	1890–1915
Adamson	—	1917–1928
Cline	—	1928–1953
Alger	—	1955–1966
Newman	—	1968–1983
DiCarlo	—	1984–1996
Barzilay	NJ	1998–2011
Barnett	VA	2013–present

Seat 8
Seat established on June 10, 1890 by 26 Stat. 131, 136
Stackpole	—	1890
Lunt	—	1891–1908
Chamberlain	—	1908–1913
Brown	—	1913–1941
Cole, Jr.	—	1942–1952
Wilson	—	1954–1966
Beckworth	—	1967–1968
Re	—	1968–1991
Wallach	NV	1995–2011
Kelly	NY	2013–present

Seat 9
Seat established on June 10, 1890 by 26 Stat. 131, 136
Jewell	—	1890–1903
McClelland	—	1903–1939
Oliver	—	1940–1967
Rosenstein	—	1968–1970
Boe	—	1971–1984
Tsoucalas	—	1986–1996
Ridgway	DC	1998–2019
Vaden	TN	2020–2025
Westercamp	VA	2026–present

== See also ==
- V.O.S. Selections, Inc. v. United States
