= Spencerian Business College =

Spencerian Business College is the name of various business schools established in the 19th century by Platt R. Spencer, his son Robert C. Spencer, or by Enos Spencer (whose relation to the other two Spencers is unclear), sometimes in association with the Bryant & Stratton chain, sometimes in rivalry, sometimes both. These included:

- Spencerian Commercial School, later Spencerian College in Louisville, Kentucky, founded by Enos Spencer. In 2018, its programs were merged into the College of Allied Health and the College of Nursing of Sullivan University.
- Spencerian Business College (Milwaukee), originally a Bryant & Stratton affiliate, first managed by Robert Spencer, then taken over by him; also known as National Spencerian Business College; eventually merged into the School of Business of Concordia University Wisconsin in 1974
- Spencerian Business College (Cleveland, Ohio), originally Folsom's Mercantile College in 1848, it became Spencerian Business College in 1876. In 1942 it merged with Dyke School of Commerce, eventually becoming Chancellor University before closing in 2013.
- Spencerian Business College (Washington, D.C.), founded in 1864 as Washington Business College
- Spencerian Business School in Newburgh, New York
- Spencerian College, one of the former names of Chancellor University in Cleveland, Ohio
