= William R. Brownfield =

American diplomat (born 1952)

William Rivington Brownfield
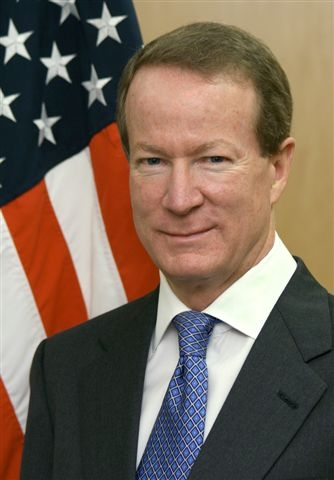

11th Assistant Secretary of State for International Narcotics and Law Enforcement Affairs
- In office January 10, 2011 – September 30, 2017
- President: Barack Obama; Donald Trump
- Deputy: Luis E. Arreaga; Alexander A. Arvizu
- Preceded by: David Johnson
- Succeeded by: Kirsten D. Madison

United States Ambassador to Colombia
- In office September 12, 2007 – August 10, 2010
- President: George W. Bush; Barack Obama
- Preceded by: William Wood
- Succeeded by: Michael McKinley

United States Ambassador to Venezuela
- In office October 15, 2004 – September 5, 2007
- President: George W. Bush
- Preceded by: Charles Shapiro
- Succeeded by: Patrick Duddy

United States Ambassador to Chile
- In office March 25, 2002 – July 19, 2004
- President: George W. Bush
- Preceded by: Philip Goldberg (Acting)
- Succeeded by: Craig Kelly

Personal details
- Born: 1952 (age 73–74)
- Spouse: Kristie Kenney
- Education: Cornell University; University of Texas, Austin; National Defense University
- William R. Brownfield's voice William Brownfield speaks on drug trafficking Recorded November 17, 2015

William Rivington Brownfield (born 1952) is a Career Ambassador in the United States Foreign Service and the former Assistant Secretary of State for the Bureau of International Narcotics and Law Enforcement Affairs as of January 10, 2011. He has previously served as U.S. Ambassador to Chile, Venezuela, and Colombia.

== Biography ==
A career Foreign Service Officer, William Brownfield was United States Ambassador to Colombia. He arrived in Colombia on August 31, 2007, and was accredited by Colombian President Álvaro Uribe on September 12, 2007. On August 3, 2010, the United States confirmed Peter Michael McKinley as the new ambassador to Colombia.

Prior to arriving in Colombia, Brownfield was Ambassador to Venezuela, and before that Chile.

Ambassador Brownfield's first assignment after joining the Foreign Service in 1979 was in Maracaibo, Venezuela. His other overseas postings include service as Counselor for Humanitarian Affairs in Geneva, and assignments in Argentina and El Salvador. He was temporarily assigned as Political Adviser to the Commander-in-Chief, U.S. Southern Command in Panama 1989–1990.

In Washington, Ambassador Brownfield's assignments have included Deputy Assistant Secretary of State for Western Hemisphere (WHA), Director for Policy in the Bureau of International Narcotics and Law Enforcement Affairs, Executive Assistant in the Bureau of Inter-American Affairs, Member of the Secretary's Policy Planning Staff, and Special Assistant to the Under Secretary for Political Affairs.

Ambassador Brownfield is a graduate of St. Andrew's School (1970), Cornell University (1974) and the National War College (1993); he also attended the University of Texas School of Law (1976–1978).

=== Chávez attacks ===
In a nationally televised speech on April 9, 2006, Venezuelan President Hugo Chávez threatened to expel Brownfield for "provoking the Venezuelan people." Chávez said "Start packing your bags, mister - if you keep on provoking us, start packing your bags, because I'll kick you out of here."

On January 25, 2007, Brownfield was again threatened with expulsion by President Chávez. Chávez was responding to Brownfield's comments on the planned nationalization of several Venezuelan companies in which US companies are minority shareholders.

=== Bureau of International Narcotics and Law Enforcement Affairs ===
Starting on January 10, 2011, Brownfield served as Assistant Secretary of State for the Bureau of International Narcotics and Law Enforcement Affairs. In August 2017, he announced his intent to retire by the end of September. During his career, Brownfield received the Secretary's Distinguished Service Award and was a three-time recipient of the Presidential Performance Award.

== Personal life ==
Brownfield is married to Ambassador Kristie Kenney, former Counselor of the State Department. He speaks Spanish with a pronounced Texas accent and French.

Diplomatic posts
| Preceded by Philip Goldberg; Acting | United States Ambassador to Chile; 2002–2004 | Succeeded by Craig Kelly |
| Preceded by Charles Shapiro | United States Ambassador to Venezuela; 2004–2007 | Succeeded by Patrick Duddy |
| Preceded by William Wood | United States Ambassador to Colombia; 2007–2010 | Succeeded by Michael McKinley |
Political offices
| Preceded by David Johnson | Assistant Secretary of State for International Narcotics and Law Enforcement Affairs; 2011–2018 | Succeeded by Kirsten D. Madison |
