= James B. Story =

American diplomat

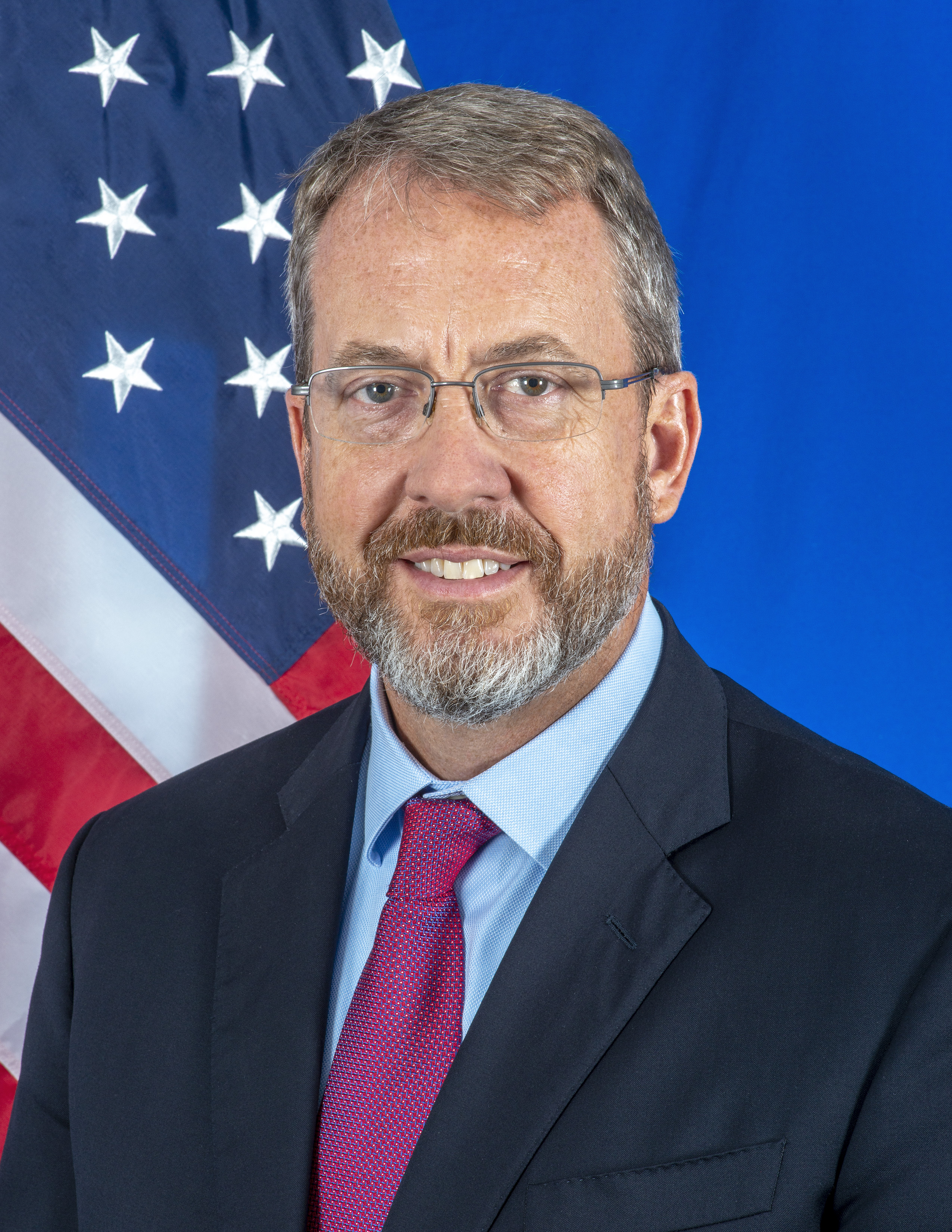
- Official portrait, 2019

United States Ambassador to Venezuela
- In office July 2018 – May 19, 2023
- President: Donald Trump; Joe Biden
- Preceded by: Todd D. Robinson

Personal details
- Born: 1970 (age 55–56) Moncks Corner, South Carolina, U.S.
- Education: University of South Carolina (BA, BSc); Georgetown University (MSFS)

James Broward Story (born 1970) is an American private consultant and former diplomat who served as United States ambassador to Venezuela from 2018 to 2023. During most of his tenure he was based in the Venezuela Affairs Unit of the Department of State, located at the United States Embassy in Bogota, Colombia. Story was serving as the deputy chief of mission in Caracas until his superior, Todd Robinson, was expelled and U.S. diplomatic operations in Venezuela ended due to security and operational concerns. Before arriving in Venezuela, Story was serving as Consul General in Rio de Janeiro.

== Career ==
A career foreign service officer, Story has served in numerous postings throughout the world including Brazil, Mozambique, Mexico and Afghanistan. He also served as head of the Bureau of International Narcotics and Law Enforcement Affairs Office for the Western Hemisphere, and headed the bureau's office in Bogota. While in Afghanistan, Story served as the Senior Civilian for Task Force Rakkasan in Regional Command East Afghanistan.

On May 6, 2020, President Trump announced his intent to nominate Story to be the next United States Ambassador to Venezuela. On November 18, 2020, his nomination was confirmed in the United States Senate by voice vote.

Story grew up in Moncks Corner, South Carolina and graduated with a B.A./B.Sc. in interdisciplinary studies from South Carolina College at the University of South Carolina. He also received a M.Sc. from the School of Foreign Service of Georgetown University.

Story has a program called "Aló Embajador" that he broadcasts on social networks where he chats with different personalities, whether political or not, while answering questions from the audience.

Story is chargé d'affaires ad interim to Angola since October 23, 2024.

== Personal life ==
Story is fluent in Spanish and Portuguese.

Diplomatic posts
| Preceded by Todd D. Robinson | United States Ambassador to Venezuela; 2018–2023 | Succeeded by Francisco Palmieri |
