= Todd D. Robinson =

American diplomat (born 1963)

Todd Robinson
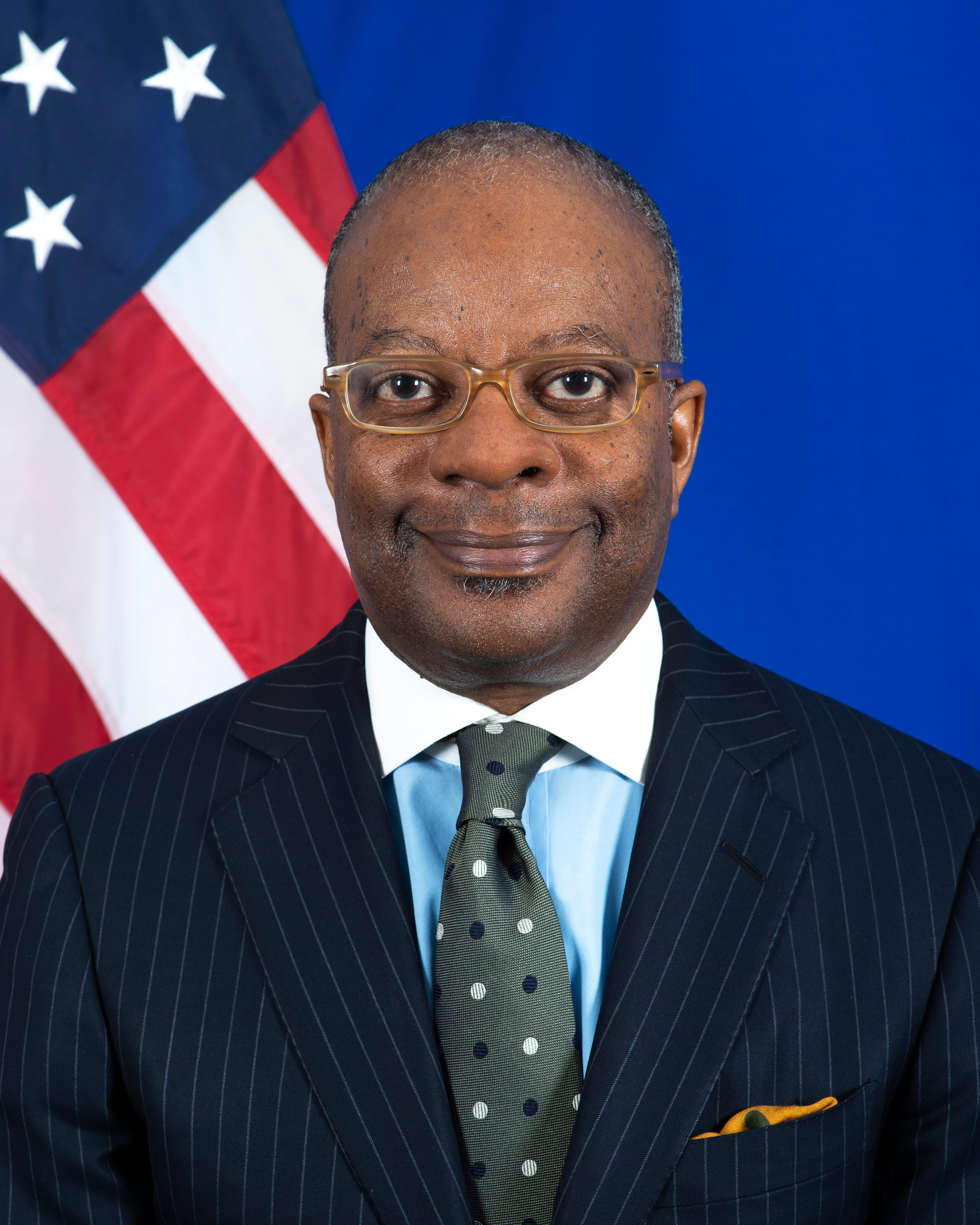
- Official portrait, 2022

13th Assistant Secretary of State for International Narcotics and Law Enforcement Affairs
- In office September 30, 2021 – January 17, 2025
- President: Joe Biden
- Preceded by: Kirsten D. Madison
- Succeeded by: Frank Weiland

United States Ambassador to Venezuela
- Acting; December 18, 2017 – May 22, 2018
- President: Donald Trump
- Preceded by: Larry Leon Palmer
- Succeeded by: James B. Story

United States Ambassador to Guatemala
- In office September 16, 2014 – September 20, 2017
- President: Barack Obama; Donald Trump
- Preceded by: Arnold A. Chacón
- Succeeded by: Luis E. Arreaga

Personal details
- Born: c. 1963 (age 62–63) Fanwood, New Jersey, U.S.
- Education: Georgetown University (BS)

Todd D. Robinson (born c. 1963) is an American diplomat who served as Assistant Secretary of State for International Narcotics and Law Enforcement Affairs between 2021 and 2025. He previously served as the charge d'affaires of the U.S. embassy in Venezuela from December 2017 until being expelled in May 2018, and the U.S. ambassador to Guatemala from 2014 to 2017.

== Early life and education ==
Raised in Fanwood, New Jersey, Robinson graduated from Scotch Plains-Fanwood High School in 1981 and earned a Bachelor of Science in Foreign Service in 1985 from Georgetown University.

Robinson speaks Spanish, Italian and Albanian.

== Consular career ==
Robinson joined the State Department in 1986, with his first postings to Colombia (in 1987) and El Salvador (in 1989). He returned to Washington in 1991, to work as watch officer at the operations center of the State Department. In 1993, Robinson was assigned to Rome, Italy as staff assistant to the ambassador at the time, Reginald Bartholomew and two years later was moved across the city to work as the political officer at the Embassy in Vatican City.

1997 saw Robinson return to Latin America to work as a political officer in the La Paz embassy, Bolivia until he was recalled in 1999 for a post as special assistant to the then Secretary of State, Madeleine Albright. The next year, he was sent to the Dominican Republic as deputy counselor for Political and Economic Affairs.

After four years at the embassy in Santo Domingo, Robinson was again posted to Europe to work as chief of the Political and Economic Section of the Albanian embassy in Tirana. Two years later, Robinson left to work as consul general at the consulate in Barcelona, Spain.

In 2009, he was posted to Guatemala as deputy chief of mission. He stayed until June 2011, when he was recalled to work in the Bureau of International Narcotics and Law Enforcement Affairs in Washington.

=== Ambassador to Guatemala ===
On June 3, 2014, President Barack Obama nominated Robinson for the ambassadorship to Guatemala. Hearings were held before the Senate Foreign Relations Committee on July 10, 2014. The committee favorably reported his nomination to the Senate floor on July 29, 2014. Robinson was confirmed by the entire Senate via voice vote on September 16, 2014.

He arrived in Guatemala City on October 10 the same year.

His service in Guatemala was marked by the political upheaval deriving from La Línea corruption case and the resignation of President Otto Pérez Molina in 2015.

Due to his actions and support of CICIG, a UN-led commission against impunity of which the USA was one of the biggest contributors, Guatemalan President Jimmy Morales, Manuel Baldizón, and other local actors lobbied for his dismissal. Their reach was wide. US Senator Mike Lee called for withdrawing US support for CICIG's mission.

The lobbying efforts failed during his term, and Todd Robinson stayed in his position for the usual three years. CICIG was later removed during ambassador Luis E. Arreaga's term.

=== Venezuela post ===
In December 2017, Robinson was reassigned by President Trump to be charge d'affairs en pied at the embassy in Caracas, Venezuela. In January 2018, Robinson attempted to obtain the release of American citizen, Joshua Holt who had been jailed in the country by meeting with Venezuelan foreign minister, Jorge Arreaza. On 22 May the same year, Robinson and his deputy, Brian Naranjo were expelled from the country as persona non grata by Nicolas Maduro, the newly re-elected president. Days later, Joshua Holt was freed and allowed to return to the United States.

Robinson then served as a senior advisor for Central America in the Bureau of Western Hemisphere Affairs in Washington, D.C., and as the Director of the International Student Management Office at the National Defense University.

=== Biden administration ===
Robinson announces a reward offer of up to $5 million for information leading to the arrest and/or conviction of alleged MS-13 leader Yulan Adonay Archaga Carias.

On April 12, 2021, President Joe Biden nominated Robinson as Assistant Secretary of State for International Narcotics and Law Enforcement Affairs. Hearings on his nomination were held before the Senate Foreign Relations Committee on June 15, 2021. The committee favorably reported his nomination to the Senate floor on June 24, 2021. On September 28, 2021, Robinson was confirmed by a vote of 53–41.

He was sworn in on September 30, 2021, and served until January 17, 2025.

Diplomatic posts
Preceded by Arnold A. Chacón	United States Ambassador to Guatemala; 2014–2017	Succeeded by Luis E. Arreaga
Preceded by Larry Leon Palmer; Acting	United States Ambassador to Venezuela; 2017–2018	Succeeded by James B. Story
