= Wrobleski =

Wrobleski is a surname. Notable people with the surname include:

- Ann B. Wrobleski (born 1952), American lobbyist
- Craig Wrobleski, Canadian cinematographer
- Justin Wrobleski (born 2000), American baseball pitcher
