= Dominick L. DiCarlo =

American politician (1928–1999)

Dominick Leonard DiCarlo

Senior Judge of the United States Court of International Trade
- In office October 31, 1996 – April 27, 1999

Chief Judge of the United States Court of International Trade
- In office 1991–1996
- Preceded by: Edward D. Re
- Succeeded by: Gregory W. Carman

Judge of the United States Court of International Trade
- In office June 11, 1984 – October 31, 1996
- Appointed by: Ronald Reagan
- Preceded by: Bernard Newman
- Succeeded by: Judith Barzilay

2nd Assistant Secretary of State for International Narcotics Matters
- In office September 25, 1981 – July 13, 1984
- Preceded by: Mathea Falco
- Succeeded by: Jon R. Thomas

Member of the New York State Assembly
- In office January 1, 1965 – September 25, 1981
- Preceded by: Luigi R. Marano
- Succeeded by: Louis Freda
- Constituency: Kings County 12th district (1965); 59th district (1966); 49th district (1967-1981)

Personal details
- Born: Dominick Leonard DiCarlo; March 11, 1928 Brooklyn, New York, U.S.
- Died: April 27, 1999 (aged 71) Manhattan, New York, U.S.
- Party: Republican
- Education: St. John's University (BA, LLB); New York University School of Law (LLM)

Dominick Leonard DiCarlo (March 11, 1928 – April 27, 1999) was an American lawyer and politician from New York. He was a member of the New York State Assembly from 1965 to 1981; Ronald Reagan's first Assistant Secretary of State for International Narcotics Matters from 1981 to 1984; and a United States Judge of the United States Court of International Trade from 1984 to 1999.

== Early life and education ==
DiCarlo was born in Brooklyn, New York on March 11, 1928, and raised in the Bay Ridge neighborhood. He was educated at St. John's College, receiving a Bachelor of Arts degree in 1950. He then attended the St. John's University School of Law, graduating with a Bachelor of Laws in 1953. He was admitted to the bar in 1954. He completed his education at the New York University School of Law, receiving a Master of Laws in 1957.

== Career ==
A practicing attorney since 1954, in 1959 he became an Assistant United States Attorney for the Eastern District of New York. In this capacity, in 1960 he became Chief of the Organized Crime and Racketeering Section. He left the United States Department of Justice in 1962. From 1962 to 1965, he was counsel to the minority leader of the New York City Council.

== New York State Legislative service ==
DiCarlo was a member of the New York State Assembly from 1965 to 1981, sitting in the 175th, 176th, 177th, 178th, 179th, 180th, 181st, 182nd, 183rd and 184th New York State Legislatures. He was Vice Chairman of the New York Joint Legislative Committee on Crime from 1969 to 1970; Chairman of the Assembly Committee on Codes and an ex officio member of the New York Law Revision Commission and the Judicial Conference of the State of New York from 1971 to 1974; and Vice Chairman of the Select Committee on Correctional Institutions and Programs (appointed in the wake of the Attica Prison riot) from 1972 to 1973 In 1973, he was the only Republican in the State Assembly who voted against the Rockefeller drug laws. From 1975 to 1978, he was Deputy Minority Leader of the New York State Assembly.

== State Department service ==
In July 1981, President Ronald Reagan announced his intention to nominate DiCarlo as Assistant Secretary of State for International Narcotics Matters. Following Senate confirmation, DiCarlo held this office from September 25, 1981, to July 13, 1984. He spent much of his time in office trying to persuade foreign leaders to supplant fields of opium poppies with other crops.

== Federal judicial service ==
On May 25, 1984, President Ronald Reagan nominated DiCarlo to replace Judge Bernard Newman of the United States Court of International Trade. He was confirmed by the United States Senate on June 8 and received his commission on June 11. President George H. W. Bush designated DiCarlo to serve as Chief Judge in 1991, a position he held until October 31, 1996, at which time he assumed senior status.

== Death and honors ==
DiCarlo died on April 27, 1999, after suffering a heart attack while exercising in the gym at the James L. Watson Court of International Trade Building.

The Annual DiCarlo Lecture in International Law at John Marshall Law School is named in his honor.

== Family ==
DiCarlo was married to Esther DiCarlo, born Esther Hansen, and the father of sons Vincent, Carl, and Robert, and a daughter Barbara. His youngest son Robert DiCarlo was a New York State Senator from 1993 to 1997. After Esther died, he was married to Susan DiCarlo, born Susan Hauck.

New York State Assembly
Preceded by Luigi R. Marano	New York State Assembly; Kings County, 12th District; 1965	Succeeded by district abolished
Preceded by new district	New York State Assembly; 59th District; 1966	Succeeded by Edward J. Amann, Jr.
Preceded by Harold W. Cohn	New York State Assembly; 49th District; 1967–1981	Succeeded by Louis Freda
Government offices
Preceded by Mathea Falco	Assistant Secretary of State for International Narcotics Matters; 1981–1984	Succeeded by Jon R. Thomas
Legal offices
Preceded by Bernard Newman	Judge of the United States Court of International Trade; 1984–1996	Succeeded by Judith Barzilay
Preceded by Edward D. Re	Chief Judge of the United States Court of International Trade; 1991–1996	Succeeded by Gregory W. Carman
