= John Cameron Monjo =

American diplomat (born 1931)

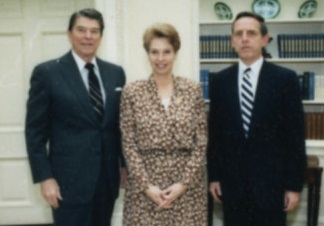
- Monjo (right) and his wife Sirkka in the Oval Office with President Ronald Reagan, 1987

18th United States Ambassador to Pakistan
- In office November 10, 1992 – September 10, 1995
- President: George H. W. Bush; Bill Clinton
- Preceded by: Nicholas Platt
- Succeeded by: Thomas W. Simons Jr.

11th United States Ambassador to Indonesia
- In office May 31, 1989 – July 18, 1992
- President: George H. W. Bush
- Preceded by: Paul Wolfowitz
- Succeeded by: Robert L. Barry

10th United States Ambassador to Malaysia
- In office June 10, 1987 – April 22, 1989
- President: Ronald Reagan; George H. W. Bush
- Preceded by: Thomas P. Shoesmith
- Succeeded by: Paul Matthews Cleveland

Personal details
- Born: July 17, 1931 (age 95) Stamford, Connecticut, U.S.
- Education: University of Pennsylvania (BS)

John Cameron Monjo (born July 17, 1931) is an American diplomat who served as the United States Ambassador to Malaysia from 1987 to 1989, the United States Ambassador to Indonesia from 1989 to 1992, and the United States Ambassador to Pakistan from 1992 to 1995.

== Early life and career ==
John Monjo served in the United States Navy from 1953 to 1956. He began his Foreign Service career as a political officer at Phnom Penh, Cambodia from 1958 to 1961. Monjo filled multiple consular roles before serving as special assistant to the Under Secretary of State for Political Affairs (1969-1971), political officer at Jakarta, Indonesia (1971-1976), principal officer for Casablanca, Morocco (1976-1978), country director in the Office of Philippine Affairs (1978-1979), and Deputy Chief of Mission in Seoul, South Korea (1979-1982).

== Senior diplomatic service ==
Monjo was chargé d'affaires ad interim at the United States embassy in Jakarta from November 1981 to February 1983. He was appointed Deputy (1983-1985), and then Senior Deputy Assistant Secretary (1985-1987) for the Bureau of East Asian and Pacific Affairs. In this capacity, Monjo responded to the decline of Philippine President Ferdinand Marcos's regime, testifying to Congress that he suspected a conspiracy behind the assassination of Ninoy Aquino, organizing the exile of Marcos and his family in Honolulu after the People Power Revolution, and aiding the subsequent accounting of Marcos's embezzlement.

Monjo's portfolio at the East Asian Bureau also involved negotiating stronger copyright laws to protect American works in Singapore.

=== Ambassador to Malaysia ===
Monjo arbitrated a dispute between the Malaysian government, union leader V. David, and the AFL-CIO, the latter two having called for tariff reductions under the Generalized System of Preferences to be stripped from Malaysia over workers' rights. The Malaysian government lifted its 15-year ban on unions in the electronics industry, only to reimpose it one month later. Nonetheless, the Bush administration rejected the AFL-CIO's petition and maintained Malaysia's GSP status.

=== Ambassador to Indonesia ===
Monjo's visit on January 17, 1990 to Dili prompted Timorese independence activist (and future Ambassador to the United States) Constâncio Pinto to organize a student demonstration. While Monjo insisted that authorities refrain from reprisals, the protestors were severely beaten by Indonesian soldiers when he departed. For the rest of the Indonesian occupation of East Timor, violent retaliation was used to deter demonstrations during diplomatic visits.

On September 9, 1990, Monjo became the first official American representative to meet with Cambodian Prime Minister Hun Sen, catalyzing the normalization of relations and adoption of the United Nations plan for new elections in Cambodia.

Following international condemnation of the Santa Cruz massacre, Monjo met with Widjojo Nitisastro, advisor to Indonesian President Suharto, on December 24, 1991, clarifying that the United States government intended to maintain military aid to Indonesia, in contrast with many other countries. However, the United States Congress cut IMET funding to Indonesia in 1992.

=== Ambassador to Pakistan ===
Monjo's tenure coincided with a rift in Pakistan-US relations, as the Pressler Amendment withheld economic and military assistance over Pakistan's development of nuclear weapons. Nonetheless, Monjo found several areas of security cooperation with Chief of the Army Staff Abdul Waheed Kakar, namely when Pakistan managed the transition of UN peacekeeping operations in Somalia, enabling US withdrawal after the Battle of Mogadishu.

Seeking to limit Iranian influence over Afghanistan, Monjo and his Pakistani counterpart met with Taliban leaders at their headquarters in Kandahar in October 1994, eschewing permission from Afghan President Burhanuddin Rabbani.

In response to the March 8, 1995 killing of two consulate employees in Karachi - CIA officer Jacqueline Van Landingham and Gary Durrell - Monjo asserted the United States' prerogative to extradite the perpetrators for trial, prompting outrage from elements of the Pakistani press. When six western tourists, including two Americans, were kidnapped by Kashmiri separatists in July 1995, Monjo pressed for their release in talks with Pakistani National Assembly member Fazal-ur-Rehman, whom the militants asked to negotiate for the freedom of their imprisoned comrades. One of the American hostages later escaped, while one body was found and the rest are presumed dead.

== Later work ==
Monjo created controversy during the 2004 Indonesian presidential election. When an observation team from the Carter Center suggested documenting military intimidation in West Papua, Monjo implied that this was unnecessary because Papuans simply weren't inclined to vote, exclaiming "For god's sake, they're naked!"

Monjo was listed as a senior advisor to Bluemont International, a global business consultancy firm founded in Washington, D.C. in 2004.

== Personal life ==
Monjo's grandfather, Ferdinand N. Monjo Sr., was a wealthy New York City-based fur trader and shipowner as heir to the Monjo Company. Monjo's brother, Ferdinand N. Monjo III (1924-1978), was an author of historical fiction for children, who also worked as the editor-in-chief for Little Golden Books as well as children's literature divisions at American Heritage Press, Harper and Row, and Coward, McCann and Geoghegan. Through Ferdinand III, Monjo is the uncle of screenwriter, television producer and actor Justin Monjo.

Monjo's maternal great-great-grandfather was Louis Joseph Bahin, a French-born painter who focused on the aristocratic class in the Antebellum South.

Diplomatic posts
Preceded by Thomas P. Shoesmith	United States Ambassador to Malaysia; 1987–1989	Succeeded by Paul Matthews Cleveland
Preceded by Paul Wolfowitz	United States Ambassador to Indonesia; 1989–1992	Succeeded by Robert L. Barry
Preceded by Nicholas Platt	United States Ambassador to Pakistan; 1992–1995	Succeeded by Thomas W. Simons Jr.
