= Robert L. Barry =

American diplomat (1934–2024)

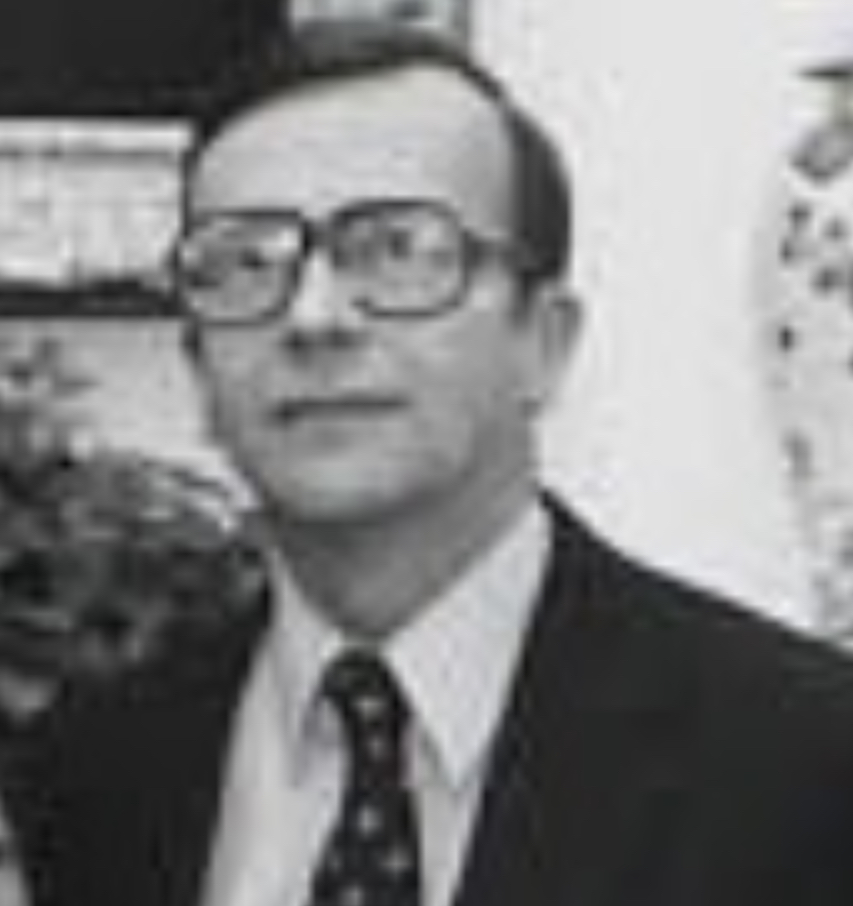
- Barry in Oval Office in 1981

United States Ambassador to Bulgaria
- In office November 25, 1981 – July 12, 1984
- President: Ronald Reagan
- Preceded by: Jack Richard Perry
- Succeeded by: Melvyn Levitsky

United States Ambassador to Indonesia
- In office July 7, 1992 – July 10, 1995
- President: George H. W. Bush; Bill Clinton
- Preceded by: John Cameron Monjo
- Succeeded by: J. Stapleton Roy

Personal details
- Born: August 28, 1934 Pittsburgh, Pennsylvania, U.S.
- Died: March 11, 2024 (aged 89) Newton, Massachusetts, U.S.
- Profession: Diplomat, Career Ambassador

Robert Louis Barry (August 28, 1934 – March 11, 2024) was an American ambassador and diplomat. He was a member of the United States Foreign Service and a United States ambassador to Bulgaria and Indonesia.

== Biography ==
Robert Louis Barry was born in Pittsburgh, Pennsylvania, on August 28, 1934.

A member of Dartmouth College's Class of 1956, he was his class' 50th-year reunion honorary degree recipient, receiving a Doctor of Laws at the college's 236th Commencement Exercises on June 11, 2006. Barry also received a master's degree from Columbia University in 1962.

Barry was the United States ambassador Indonesia from 1992 to 1995. He served as ambassador to Bulgaria from 1981 to 1984. He was the head of the US delegation to the Stockholm Conference on Disarmament in Europe from 1985 to 1987, the deputy director of the Voice of America from 1988 to 1990 and the Coordinator of US Assistance to Eastern Europe from 1990 to 1992. Following retirement he was the Head of Mission for the Organization for Security and Cooperation in Europe in Bosnia and Herzegovina from 1998 to 2001.

Barry lived in Rindge, New Hampshire. Barry died from vascular dementia at his home in Newton, Massachusetts, on March 11, 2024, at the age of 89.

Diplomatic posts
Preceded by Jack Richard Perry	United States Ambassador to Bulgaria; 1981–1984	Succeeded by Melvyn Levitsky
Preceded by John C. Monjo	United States Ambassador to Indonesia; 1992–1995	Succeeded by J. Stapleton Roy
