= Sol Polansky =

American diplomat

Sol Polansky (November 7, 1926 – January 6, 2016) was an American diplomat.

Born in Newark, Polansky received his bachelor's degree from University of California in 1950. He then went to Columbia University and attended the Russian Institute from 1950 to 1952. In 1972 Polansky went to the National War College in Washington, D. C. Polansky joined the United States Foreign Service in 1962; he was stationed in the Soviet Union, Poland and West Berlin. He was also stationed in East Germany from 1976 to 1979 and in Austria from 1979 to 1983. From 1987 until 1990, Polansky was the United States Ambassador to Bulgaria.

== Notes ==
Diplomatic posts
Preceded by Melvyn Levitsky	United States Ambassador to Bulgaria; 1987–1990	Succeeded by Hugh Kenneth Hill
