= National Security Network =

American-based foreign policy organization

- Abbreviation: NSN
- Formation: 2006
- Dissolved: 2016
- Type: National security think tank
- Headquarters: 1300 L Street, NW
- Location: Washington, D.C.
- Chairman of the board: Brian Katulis
- Website: nsnetwork.org

The National Security Network (NSN) was a non-profit foreign policy organization headquartered in Washington, D.C., United States, that focused on international relations, global affairs and national security. Characterizing itself as "progressive," the NSN's mission statement asserts the group aimed to "build a strong progressive national security and counter conservative spin."

NSN "suspended active operations" as of March 2016, according to their website.

Its founder, Rand Beers, was a Bush administration counter-terrorism expert and is the former National Security Adviser to the John Kerry presidential campaign, 2004. Beers resigned from NSN in 2009 to serve as Counselor to Secretary of Homeland Security Janet Napolitano. Among other things, the National Security Network acts as a resource for media outlets, releasing frequent opinion papers on a wide variety of foreign policy issues and engaging in rapid responses to current events. It also hosted the liberal global affairs blog Democracy Arsenal.

== History and Mission ==
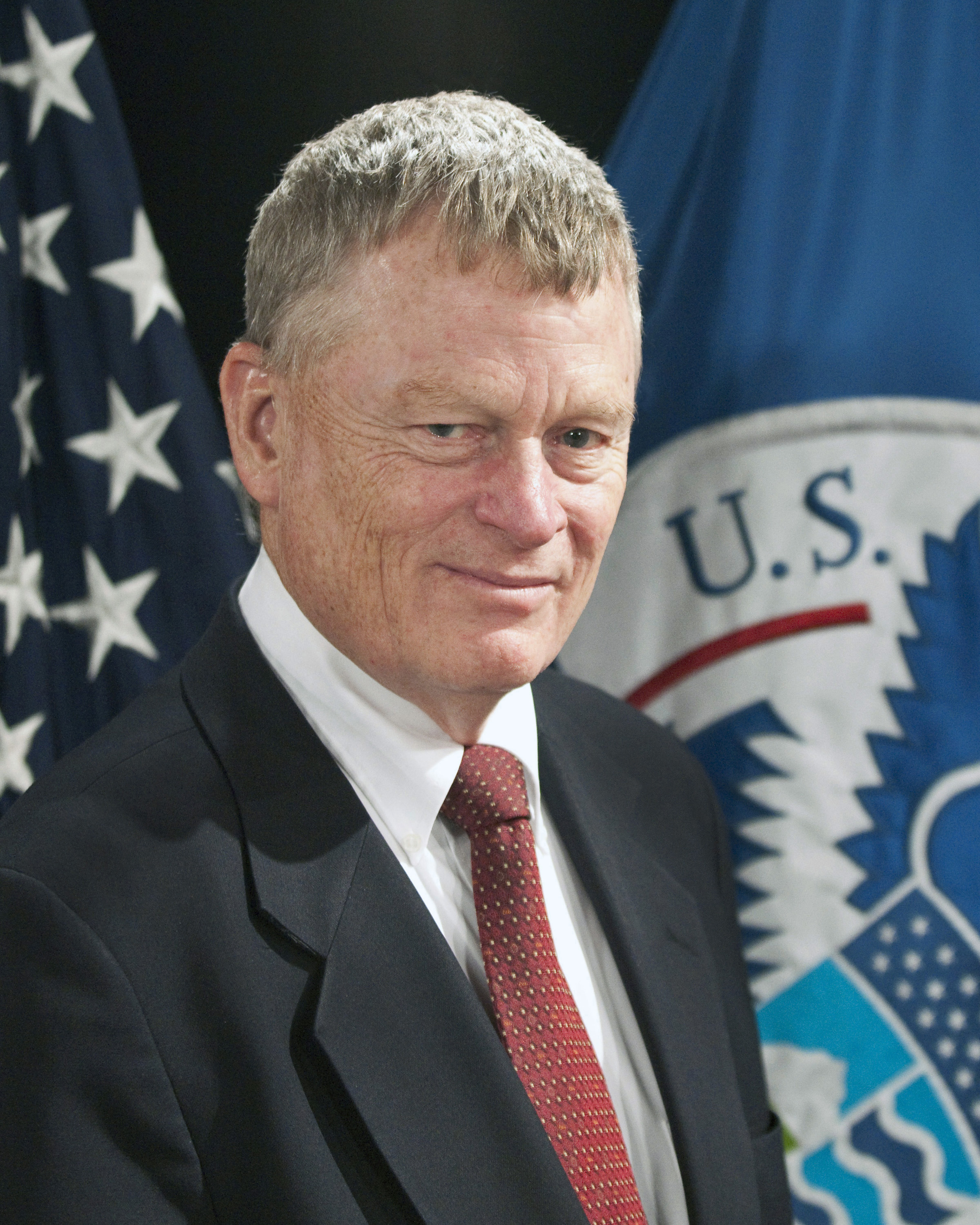
Rand Beers, founder.

The National Security Network was founded in 2006 by counter-terrorism expert and two-decade White House veteran Rand Beers. Beers led the Department of Homeland Security review team for Barack Obama's transition. He resigned from NSN in 2009 to serve as Counselor to Secretary of Homeland Security Janet Napolitano.

According to its About Us web page, NSN's mission was to "develop pragmatic and principled progressive national security policies for a new era. The organization believed in building upon the greatest legacies of American foreign policy through combining a strong and flexible military with shrewd diplomacy; the strategic and effective use of alliances; and above all, an unwavering commitment to America’s basic values."

== Projects ==
NSN worked with a large network of experts to identify, develop, and communicate progressive national security policy solutions, focusing on the current issues of our time. NSN's products included policy briefs, developed by NSN's Policy Basics Project; the pre-eminent Democracy Arsenal blog; and the War Room, NSN's rapid response operation. In partnership with the US in the World project of Demos (U.S. think tank), NSN was deeply involved with the Who Owns Security project, which seeks to determine how the American public currently views the parties on national security; why the public holds those attitudes and feelings; and where they do or don't connect with specific national security issues.

NSN experts were frequently invited to speak on a variety of foreign policy issues at events nationwide.

== The NSN Community ==
The National Security Network distributed its message to elected officials, political candidates, the media, national security experts, community leaders, and non-governmental organizations. NSN's 2,000-plus members and experts represented the emerging generation of foreign policy leaders. Its advisory board included: Chairman Leslie H. Gelb, Sandy Berger, Wesley Clark, Anne-Marie Slaughter, Theodore C. Sorensen, and Frank G. Wisner. Prior to becoming President Obama's envoy to Afghanistan and Pakistan, Richard C. Holbrooke also served on the NSN Advisory Board.

== Local Chapters ==
NSN believed that national security is a local issue, and worked to bridge the divide between citizens and experts. NSN worked to strengthen public support for responsible, progressive foreign policy through its local chapters, located in Ohio, Iowa, Florida, Connecticut, Pennsylvania, Colorado, New Mexico and Missouri.
