= Jon R. Thomas =

United States politician (1946-2017)

3rd Assistant Secretary of State for International Narcotics Matters
- In office October 10, 1984 – April 18, 1986
- Preceded by: Dominick L. DiCarlo
- Succeeded by: Ann B. Wrobleski

Personal details
- Born: January 7, 1946 Minneapolis, Minnesota, U.S.
- Died: December 28, 2017 (aged 71)
- Party: Republican
- Education: University of Minnesota, Vanderbilt University

Jon R. Thomas (January 7, 1946 - December 28, 2017) was United States Assistant Secretary of State for International Narcotics Matters from 1984 to 1986.

== Biography ==
Jon R. Thomas was born in Minneapolis on January 7, 1946. Thomas spent 1966 through 1969 as a member of the U.S. Special Forces, earning a Silver Star, a Bronze Star, the Cross of Gallantry and Purple Heart.

Thomas was educated at the University of Minnesota, receiving a B.A. degree in 1970. Upon graduating, he joined the United States Department of State and served as a Foreign Service reserve officer in Spain and Switzerland until 1977.

Thomas left government service in 1977, becoming president of Turfaid, an equipment distributorship.

He returned to the government in 1980, when he became a senior staff member of the Policy Planning Staff at the State Department. In 1982, he became Deputy Assistant Secretary of State for International Narcotics Matters. President of the United States Ronald Reagan subsequently nominated Thomas to be Assistant Secretary of State for International Narcotics Matters and Thomas held this office from October 10, 1984, until April 18, 1986. In this capacity, he was the U.S. representative to the United Nations Commission on Narcotic Drugs. Thomas played a large role in the "internationalization" of the United States' narcotics control strategy.

Thomas also received a Master of Arts and Sciences from Vanderbilt University in 1995. He served as president and chief executive officer of CIC Systems, an alternative energy company, from 1999 to 2004. He also served as president and chief executive officer of Energy Developments, an international renewal energy corporation, from 2005 to 2011. He was an adjunct professor in international business at the Jack C. Massey Graduate School of Business, Belmont University from 1989 to 1999.

Thomas died on December 28, 2017.

Government offices
Preceded by Dominick L. DiCarlo	Assistant Secretary of State for International Narcotics Matters; October 10, 1984 – April 18, 1986	Succeeded by Ann B. Wrobleski
