= Kirsten Madison =

American government official (born 1968)

Kristen D. Madison
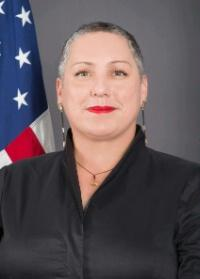

12th Assistant Secretary of State for International Narcotics and Law Enforcement Affairs
- In office May 11, 2018 – January 20, 2021
- President: Donald Trump
- Preceded by: William Brownfield
- Succeeded by: Todd D. Robinson

Personal details
- Born: February 14, 1968 (age 58)
- Education: Goucher College (BA); London School of Economics (MSc)

Kirsten Dawn Madison (born February 14, 1968) is the Vice President for Government Relations at the National Endowment for Democracy (NED), effective June 27, 2022. Before that, Madison worked for the United States Senate Committee on Homeland Security and Governmental Affairs as the Director of Homeland Security. She served as Assistant Secretary of State for International Narcotics and Law Enforcement Affairs from May 11, 2018, to January 20, 2021.

== Biography ==
Madison earned a MSc in European Studies from the London School of Economics in 1991 and a BA in International Relations from Goucher College in 1990.
