= Rand Beers =

American government official

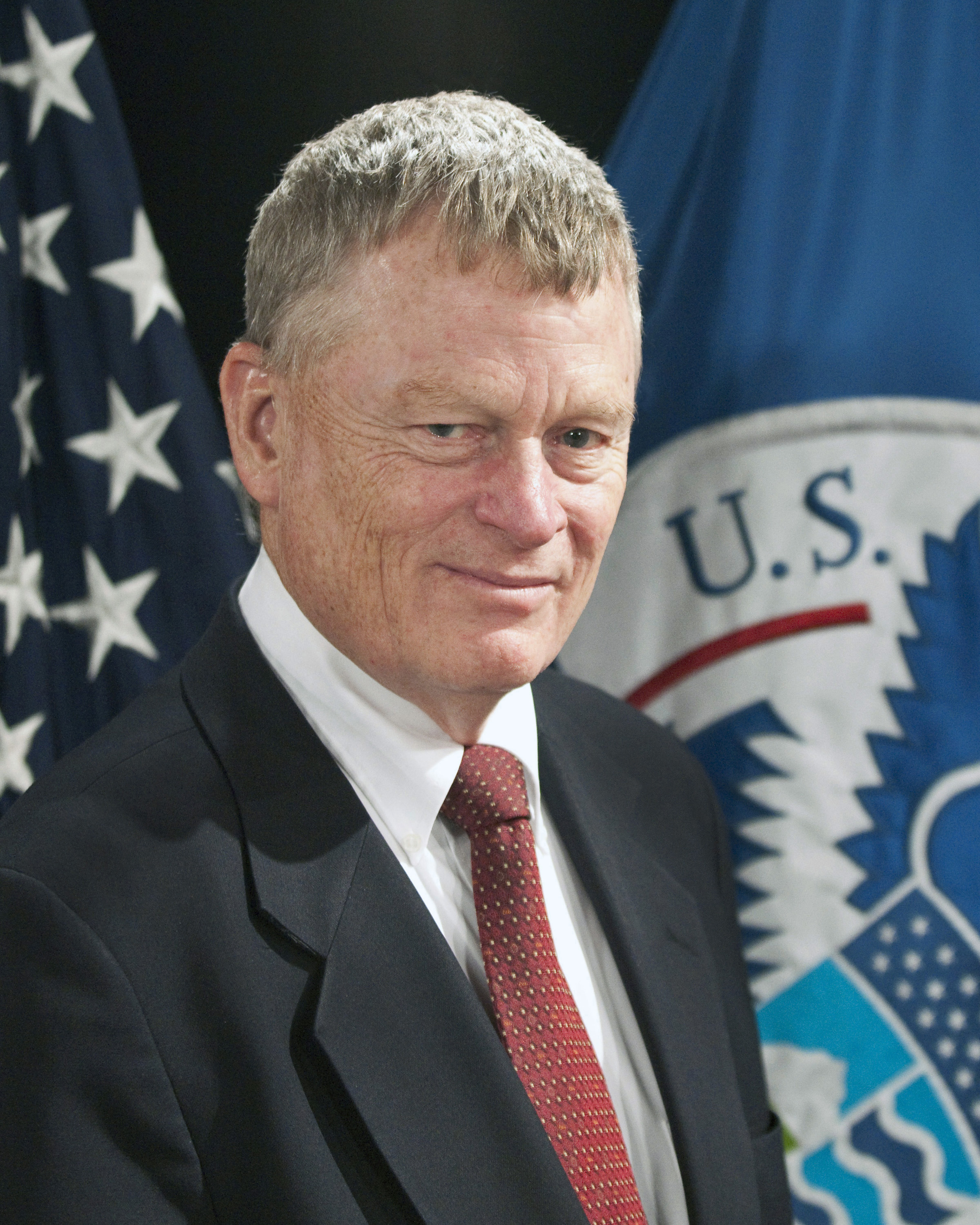

United States Secretary of Homeland Security
- Acting
- In office September 6, 2013 – December 23, 2013
- President: Barack Obama
- Deputy: Rafael Borras (acting)
- Preceded by: Janet Napolitano
- Succeeded by: Jeh Johnson

United States Deputy Secretary of Homeland Security
- Acting
- In office April 9, 2013 – September 6, 2013
- President: Barack Obama
- Preceded by: Jane Holl Lute
- Succeeded by: Rafael Borras (acting)

Under Secretary of Homeland Security for National Protection and Programs
- In office June 19, 2009 – March 6, 2014
- President: Barack Obama
- Preceded by: Robert Jamison
- Succeeded by: Suzanne Spaulding

7th Assistant Secretary of State for International Narcotics and Law Enforcement Affairs
- In office October 25, 1998 – August 31, 2002
- President: Bill Clinton; George W. Bush
- Preceded by: Robert S. Gelbard
- Succeeded by: Robert B. Charles

Personal details
- Born: November 30, 1942 (age 83) Washington, D.C., U.S.
- Party: Democratic
- Education: Dartmouth College (BA); University of Michigan (MA)

Military service
- Allegiance: United States
- Branch/service: United States Marine Corps
- Years of service: 1964–1968
- Battles/wars: Vietnam War

Robert Rand Brittingham Beers (born November 30, 1942) is an American government official. He served as Deputy Homeland Security Advisor to the President of the United States during the Barack Obama administration. He also served as acting Secretary of Homeland Security following the resignation of Secretary Janet Napolitano on September 6, 2013, until Jeh Johnson assumed that office on December 23, 2013.

== Early career ==
Beers began his professional career as a Marine officer and rifle company commander in Vietnam (1964–1968). He entered the Foreign Service in 1971 and transferred to the Civil Service in 1983. He served most of his career in the Department of State, including as Deputy Assistant Secretary of State for Regional Affairs in the Bureau of Politico-Military Affairs, focusing on the Middle East and Persian Gulf (1992–1993). He was Assistant Secretary of State for International Narcotics and Law Enforcement Affairs (1998–2002).

Beers also served on the NSC Staff in the following capacies: Director for Counter-terrorism and Counter-narcotics (1988–1992), Director for Peacekeeping (1993–1995), and Special Assistant to the President and Senior Director for Intelligence Programs (1995–1998), and Special Assistant to the President and Senior Director for Combating Terrorism on the NSC Staff (2002–2003).

He resigned from the NSC Staff in March 2003, retired from government service in April 2003, and served as national security advisor for the Kerry-Edwards campaign (2003–2004).

== John McCain controversy ==
Beers stirred up controversy with remarks he made at an event hosted by the Center for American Progress in June 2008. The event, dubbed "McCain University," was a comprehensive effort to illustrate John McCain's policy proposals in the context of the 2008 Presidential Election. During the question and answer portion of the event, Beers noted that "his [John McCain's] national security experience [...] is sadly limited" due to the fact that "he was in isolation essentially for many of those years and did not experience the turmoil here or the challenges that were involved for those of us who served in Vietnam during the Vietnam war." McCain, a captured U.S. Navy aviator, was a prisoner of war of the North Vietnamese government for several years, and was repeatedly tortured. Beers's comments elicited widespread criticism from conservative observers such as Rush Limbaugh and Karl Rove, as well as a variety of right-wing blogs.

== Homeland Security career ==
As Under Secretary, Beers directed the Department's efforts to reduce risks to physical, cyber and communications infrastructures. NPPD collaborates with all levels of government, the private sector, non-government organizations, and international bodies to prevent, respond to, and mitigate threats to U.S. national security from acts of terrorism, natural disasters, and other catastrophic events.

He is a member of the National Infrastructure Advisory Council.

Beers served as Counselor to Secretary Janet Napolitano beginning on January 21, 2009, and continued in that capacity while directing the activities of NPPD. Before his appointment, he was the co-leader of the Department of Homeland Security Transition Team for the incoming Obama administration. Prior to the 2008 election, Beers was president of the National Security Network, a Washington, D.C.–based foreign policy think tank he founded in 2006 to foster discussion of progressive national security ideas around the country, and an adjunct lecturer at Harvard Kennedy School at Harvard University.

Between April and September in 2013, he was the acting United States Deputy Secretary of Homeland Security.

Following Napolitano's resignation on September 6, 2013, Beers became acting United States Secretary of Homeland Security. His tenure ended when Jeh Johnson was confirmed as Napolitano's replacement by the United States Senate on December 23, 2013.

== Personal life ==
Beers earned a bachelor's degree from Dartmouth College and a master's degree from the University of Michigan. The New York Times described Beers as "always a Democrat, though he served in several Republican administrations and says he voted for only one Republican: Spiro T. Agnew for governor of Maryland in 1966".

Political offices
Preceded by Robert Gelbard	Assistant Secretary of State for International Narcotics and Law Enforcement Affairs; 1998–2002	Succeeded by Robert Charles
Preceded by Robert Jamison	Under Secretary of Homeland Security for National Protection and Programs; 2009–2013	Succeeded by Suzanne Spaulding; Acting
Preceded by Jane Lute	United States Deputy Secretary of Homeland Security; Acting; 2013	Succeeded by Rafael Borras; Acting
Preceded by Janet Napolitano	United States Secretary of Homeland Security; Acting; 2013	Succeeded by Jeh Johnson
