= Assistant Secretary of State for International Narcotics and Law Enforcement Affairs =

U.S. government position

United States Assistant Secretary of State for International Narcotics and Law Enforcement Affairs
- Seal of the United States Department of State

- Flag of an assistant secretary of state

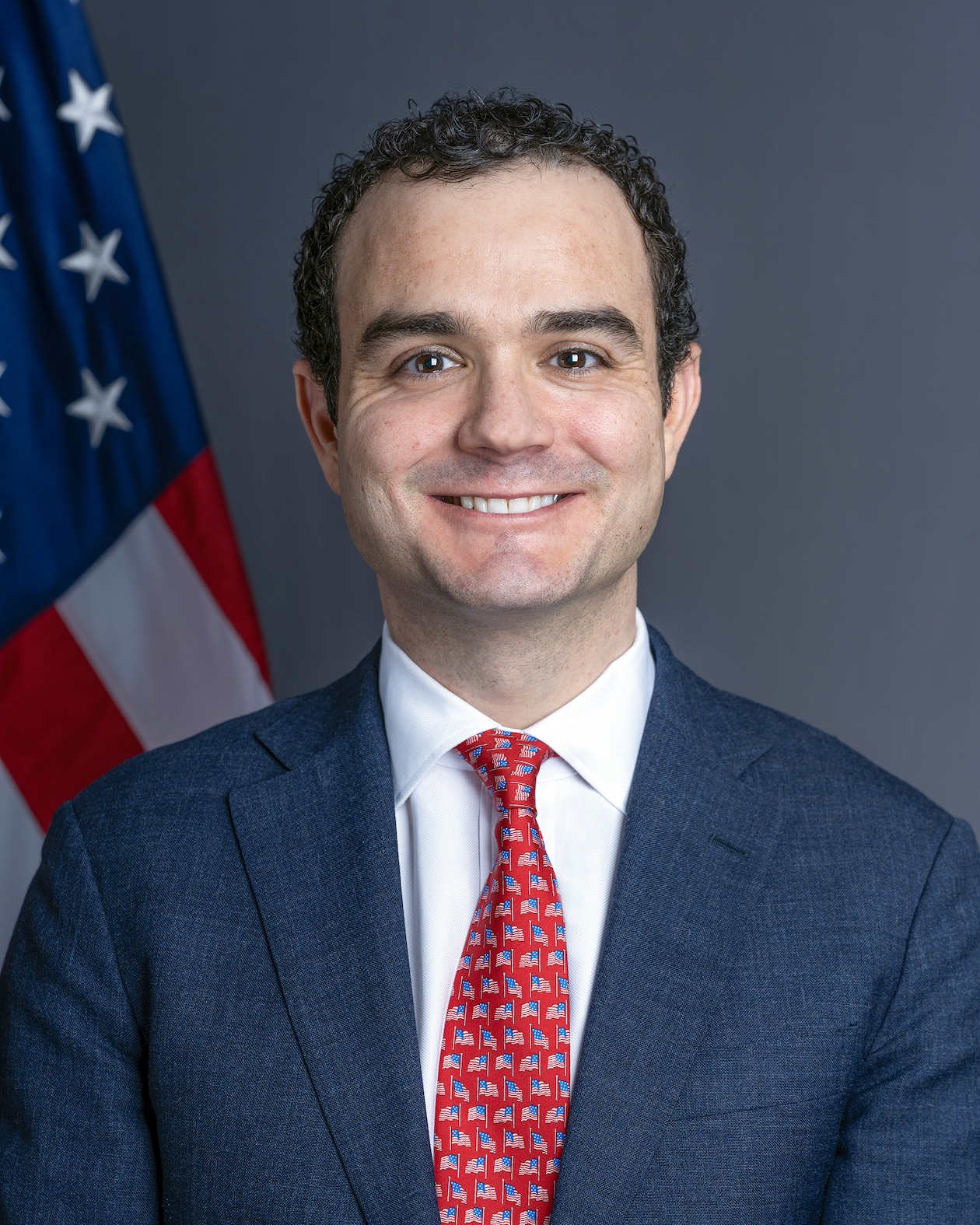
- Incumbent; Frank Weiland since May 22, 2026
- Reports to: Under Secretary of State for Arms Control and International Security
- Nominator: President of the United States
- Inaugural holder: Mathea Falco
- Formation: 1979
- Website: Official Website

The assistant secretary of state for international narcotics and law enforcement affairs is a position of the United States government within the Department of State that heads the Bureau of International Narcotics and Law Enforcement Affairs, which is responsible for development of policies and programs to combat international narcotics and crime.

On October 1, 1978, Congress, in the Foreign Relations Authorization Act for fiscal Year 1979, authorized the position of Assistant Secretary of State for International Narcotics Matters, to be responsible for the overall coordination of the role of the Department of State in the international aspects of narcotics problems. This title had been given in full in each appointee's commission. The new assistant secretary, who headed the Bureau for International Narcotics Matters, replaced a senior adviser to the secretary of state on narcotics, who had served with a rank equivalent to an assistant secretary of state since 1971. The Department of State first supported the Department of the Treasury's Bureau of Narcotics in 1909. The title of this position was changed from International Narcotics Matters to International Narcotics and Law Enforcement Affairs on February 10, 1995.

== List of assistant secretaries of state ==
=== International narcotics matters, 1979–1995 ===
#	Name	Assumed office	Left office	President served under
1	Mathea Falco	February 6, 1979	January 21, 1981	Jimmy Carter and Ronald Reagan
2	Dominick L. DiCarlo	September 25, 1981	July 13, 1984	Ronald Reagan
3	Jon R. Thomas	October 10, 1984	April 18, 1986	Ronald Reagan
4	Ann B. Wrobleski	September 30, 1986	June 17, 1989	Ronald Reagan and George H. W. Bush
5	Melvyn Levitsky	June 23, 1989	November 23, 1993	George H. W. Bush and Bill Clinton
6	Robert S. Gelbard	November 23, 1993	April 10, 1997	Bill Clinton

=== International narcotics and law enforcement affairs, 1995–present ===
The title "Assistant Secretary of State for International Narcotics Matters" was renamed "Assistant Secretary of State for International Narcotics and Law Enforcement Affairs" on February 10, 1995.

#	Name	Assumed office	Left office	President served under
6	Robert S. Gelbard	November 23, 1993	April 10, 1997	Bill Clinton
7	Rand Beers	October 28, 1998	August 31, 2002	Bill Clinton and George W. Bush
-	Paul E. Simons (acting)	September 1, 2002	October 5, 2003	George W. Bush
8	Robert B. Charles	October 6, 2003	March 15, 2005	George W. Bush
9	Anne W. Patterson	November 28, 2005	June 22, 2007	George W. Bush
10	David T. Johnson	October 31, 2007	January 10, 2011	George W. Bush, Barack Obama
11	William Brownfield	January 10, 2011	September 30, 2017	Barack Obama and Donald Trump
-	Daniel Lewis Foote (acting)	September 30, 2017	December 2017	Donald Trump
12	Kirsten D. Madison	May 11, 2018	January 20, 2021	Donald Trump
-	James A. Walsh (acting)	January 20, 2021	September 30, 2021	Joe Biden
13	Todd D. Robinson	September 30, 2021	January 17, 2025	Joe Biden
-	Frank Cartwright Weiland (acting)	January 20, 2025	June 30, 2025	Donald Trump
-	Chris Landberg (acting)	June 30, 2025	May 22, 2026	Donald Trump
14	Frank Cartwright Weiland	May 22, 2026	Present	Donald Trump
