= Melvyn Levitsky =

American diplomat (1938–2025)

United States Ambassador to Bulgaria
- In office September 21, 1984 – February 6, 1987
- President: Ronald Reagan
- Preceded by: Robert L. Barry
- Succeeded by: Sol Polansky

United States Ambassador to Brazil
- In office June 1, 1994 – June 17, 1998
- President: Bill Clinton
- Preceded by: Richard Huntington Melton
- Succeeded by: Anthony Stephen Harrington

12th Executive Secretary of the United States Department of State
- In office 1987–1989
- Preceded by: Nicholas Platt
- Succeeded by: J. Stapleton Roy

5th Assistant Secretary of State for International Narcotics Matters
- In office June 23, 1989 – November 23, 1993
- Preceded by: Ann B. Wrobleski
- Succeeded by: Robert S. Gelbard

Personal details
- Born: March 19, 1938 Sioux City, Iowa, U.S.
- Died: May 17, 2025 (aged 87) Ann Arbor, Michigan, U.S.
- Education: University of Michigan
- Profession: Diplomat, Career Ambassador

Melvyn Levitsky (March 19, 1938 – May 17, 2025) was an American diplomat who served as United States Ambassador to Bulgaria (1984–1987) and Brazil (1994–1998).

== Life and career ==
Levitsky was born in Sioux City, Iowa on March 19, 1938. He had a Bachelor of Arts degree from the University of Michigan and a Master of Arts degree in political science from the University of Iowa. From 1989 to 1993 he served as Assistant Secretary of State for International Narcotics Matters. In 2003, he became a board member of the International Narcotics Control Board.

He was a member of the American Academy of Diplomacy, and also served on the advisory board of the Global Panel Foundation.

Levitsky died in Ann Arbor, Michigan on May 17, 2025, at the age of 87.

Diplomatic posts
Preceded by Robert L. Barry	United States Ambassador to Bulgaria; 1984–1987	Succeeded by Sol Polansky
Preceded by Richard H. Melton	United States Ambassador to Brazil; 1994–1998	Succeeded by Anthony S. Harrington
Government offices
Preceded by Ann B. Wrobleski	Assistant Secretary of State for International Narcotics Matters; June 23, 1989 – November 23, 1993	Succeeded by Robert S. Gelbard
