= Adam Platt =

American writer and restaurant critic (born 1958)

- Born: July 18, 1958 (age 67); Washington, D.C., United States
- Occupations: Writer, restaurant critic
- Title: Senior Restaurant Critic at New York
- Spouse: Kate Platt
- Children: 2
- Father: Nicholas Platt
- Relatives: Oliver Platt (brother)

Adam Platt (born July 18, 1958) is an American writer and restaurant critic. He is currently the senior restaurant critic for New York magazine, a position he has held since July 2000, when he succeeded Gael Greene. He won the James Beard Foundation Journalism Award for Restaurant Reviews in 2009, and has been nominated for the same award on other occasions.

== Early life and education ==
Platt was born in Washington, D.C., and is the son of Nicholas Platt, the former president of the Asia Society, in New York City, and a career diplomat for the United States Foreign Service who served as U.S. ambassador to Pakistan, Zambia, and the Philippines. He is the older brother of the actor Oliver Platt, who has said he used his brother's real-life eating experience to inform his performance as restaurant critic Ramsey Michel in the film Chef. Platt credits his rambling childhood – the Platts lived for extended periods of time in Taiwan, Hong Kong, Beijing, and Tokyo — with shaping his wide-ranging and eclectic appetites.

Platt is a graduate of the American School in Tokyo, Japan, the Georgetown University School of Foreign Service, and the Columbia University Graduate School of Journalism.

== Journalism and restaurant criticism ==
Before becoming a full-time restaurant critic, Platt wrote and worked for many publications including The New Yorker, where he was a Talk of the Town staff writer, The New York Observer and Elle, where he wrote monthly columns, and Condé Nast Traveler where he was a contributing editor for many years and travelled on assignment to the Southern Island of New Zealand, Botswana, China and Tokyo.

He also spent time working and living in Washington, D.C. and is the co-author of columnist Joseph Alsop's memoir, I've Seen the Best of It.

Platt has always said that his quirky, eclectic background contributes to his style as a reviewer, which he describes in his memoir The Book of Eating as "part cultural essay, part personal diary, part service journalist, and part travel and cultural commentary". In the early Aughts Platt coined the term "Haute Barnyard" to describe the Farm to Table craze sweeping the gourmet restaurants of New York City. He has written extensively on the controversial practice of tipping, and the demise of the old diner culture around New York.

Platt has said his "lumberjack size" makes it difficult to disguise himself in restaurants. In January 2014 he became one of the first prominent restaurant critics in the US to do away with what he described as the pretentious "Kabuki dance" of fake disguises and anonymity, when New York magazine's former editor, Adam Moss, decided to feature him on the cover.

Prominent New York restaurateurs, including Mario Batali and Keith McNally, have taken issue with his reviews over the years, and in 2013 he was kicked out of Rich Torrisi and Mario Carbone's West Village restaurant, ZZ's Clam Bar.

== Personal life ==
Platt is married to the architect Kate Platt. They live in New York City with their two daughters.
