= Patrick Duddy =

American diplomat

Patrick D. Duddy
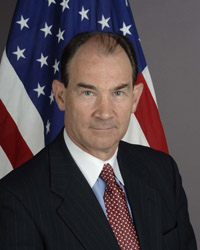

United States Ambassador to Venezuela
- In office October 29, 2007 – July 16, 2010
- President: George W. Bush; Barack Obama
- Preceded by: William Brownfield
- Succeeded by: Phil Laidlaw, (Chargé d'Affaires a.i.)

Patrick Dennis Duddy is an American diplomat, formerly United States Ambassador to Venezuela.

== Career ==
He served from August 6, 2007, to September 11, 2008, during the Bush administration, was expelled by Venezuelan President Hugo Chávez, and eight months later was returned as ambassador by the Obama administration. He replaced William Brownfield, who also was the subject of repeated threats of expulsion from Chávez before leaving to become ambassador to Colombia.

Duddy served for just over a year before being expelled by Chavez, who claimed to have uncovered an American-led plot to overthrow him. The action took place after, and partially as a result of, a dispute between the United States and Bolivian president Evo Morales; Chávez expressed support for Morales. The embassy was run by John Caulfield as Chargé d'Affaires in the interim. In March 2008 Duddy had requested funding from the United States Agency for International Development and the United States Department of Defense "to influence the information environment within Venezuela".

He returned on July 1, 2009, when the Obama administration restored diplomatic relations with Venezuela. He finished his assignment on July 16, 2010. President Obama nominated Larry Palmer as his replacement. However, the Senate did not confirm him and Hugo Chávez refused to accept him as ambassador, leaving the position vacant. Duddy currently serves as a diplomat in residence at Duke University's Center for International Studies. Duddy attended undergraduate at Colby College, graduating in 1972.

Diplomatic posts
| Preceded by William Brownfield | United States Ambassador to Venezuela; 2007–2010 | Succeeded by John Caulfield |
