= State Department Air Wing =

Department of the US Government

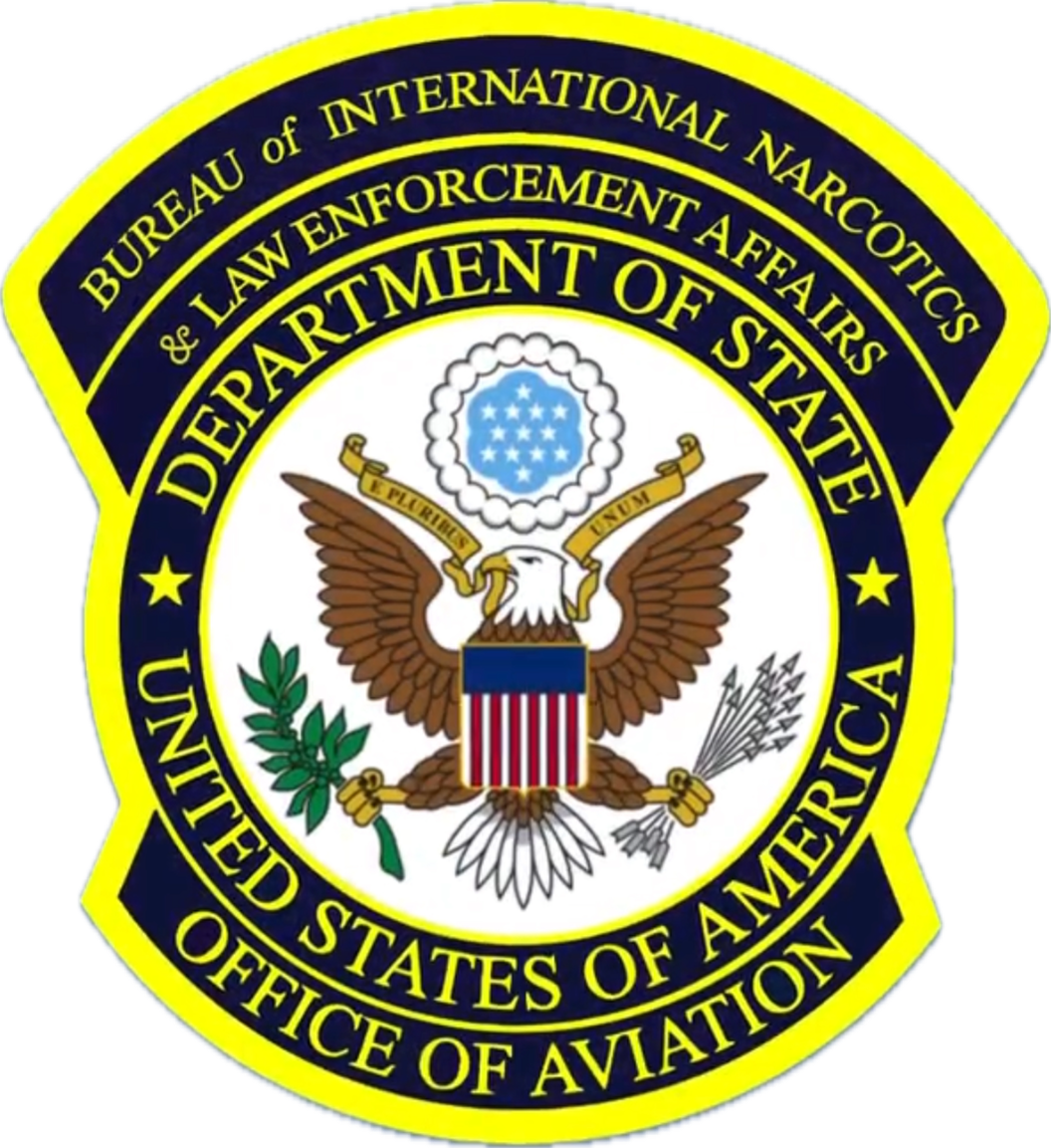
- Seal of the Air Wing

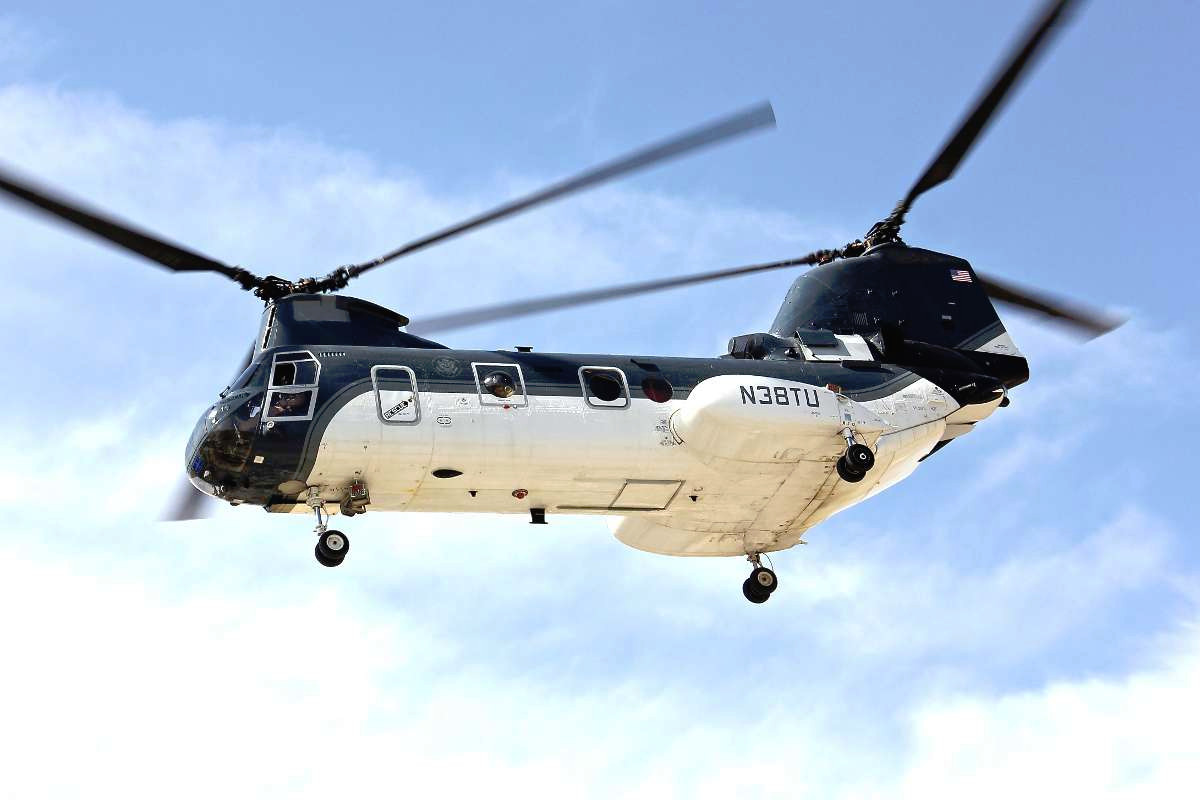
- Air Wing Sea Knight N38TU, involved in US withdrawals from both Vietnam and Afghanistan

Office overview
- Formed: 1986
- Type: Aviation support
- Jurisdiction: Executive branch of the United States
- Headquarters: Patrick Space Force Base, Florida
- Employees: 60 (excluding contractors)
- Annual budget: USD$1 billion (2020)
- Parent department: United States Department of State
- Parent bureau: Bureau of International Narcotics and Law Enforcement Affairs
- Website: state.gov/air-wing-program
- Agency ID: (INL/A)

The State Department Air Wing (DoSAW), formally the Bureau of International Narcotics and Law Enforcement Affairs Office of Aviation (INL Air Wing or INL/A) is an office of the United States Department of State that supports diplomatic aviation needs falling outside the legal authority or scope of the U.S. Air Force.

INL's fleet of roughly 200 is composed mostly of vintage aircraft and surplus military helicopters, so as to ease maintenance in austere environments and decrease the cost of upkeep for developing governments that often receive the aircraft. Its aircraft fly more than 13,000 hours annually in support of missions related to counternarcotics, counterterrorism, border security, law enforcement, and embassy transportation. Because of the size and diversity of the fleet and the demands of its global operations, the Air Wing is sometimes referred to as "America's other air force."

== History ==
Air Wing dates to 1978, when the Bureau of International Narcotics and Law Enforcement Affairs was used as the conduit to provide excess U.S. government aircraft to foreign nations to support counternarcotics efforts. Early missions involved crop dusting over drug-production fields in Mexico, Colombia, and Burma. In the early 1980's operations expanded Guatemala and Colombia. In 1984, the Department purchased its first aircraft, a T-65 it used for aerial eradication of illicit drug crops in cooperation with the government of Mexico. The following year, operations began in the Caribbean and Belize.

As the War on Drugs grew, the fleet of aircraft became a larger part of the Department's counternarcotics mission, and in 1986 Congress authorized the creation of a dedicated air wing for the department. Despite the limited scope of its origins, the mission quickly expanded as the needs of the department grew, and the office now services the needs of “counter-terrorism, border security/law enforcement, and embassy transportation missions.”

== Operations ==
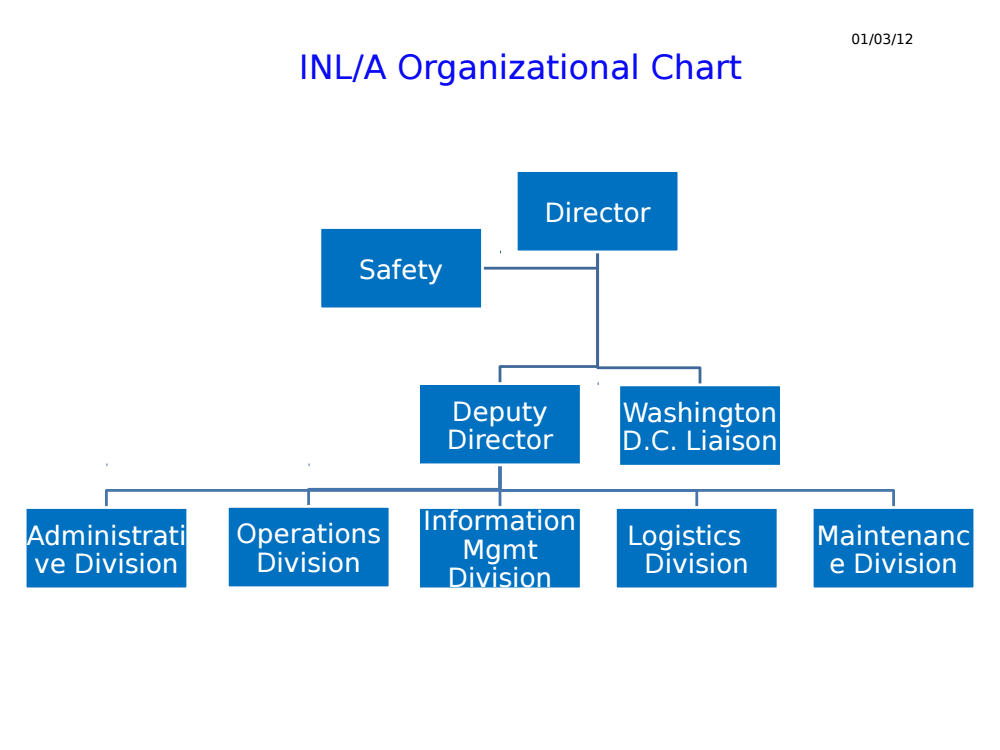
Air Wing organization chart as of 2012.

In five of the seven countries where the Air Wing operates, contractors work with local military and law enforcement, and often fly aircraft painted in the insignia of those nations. Through bilateral agreements, Air Wing contractors are embedded directly with the Bolivian Air Force, the Colombian National Police, the Guatemalan Air Force, the Pakistani Frontier Corps, and the Peruvian National Police. Only in Iraq and Afghanistan were Air Wing personnel not directly embedded with another force.

Often the Air Wing trains foreign partners in the maintenance and operation of the aircraft before donating or selling the aircraft to that nation.

Several times a year the Air Wing also provides humanitarian assistance in disasters when requested by the Department, including during floods in Bolivia and Pakistan in 2010.

In 2022 INL/A grew its operations further by establishing an aviation program to support the Libyan Embassy. The airwing currently operates the DHC-8-315 series aircraft out of Malta to support these operations.

== Fleet ==
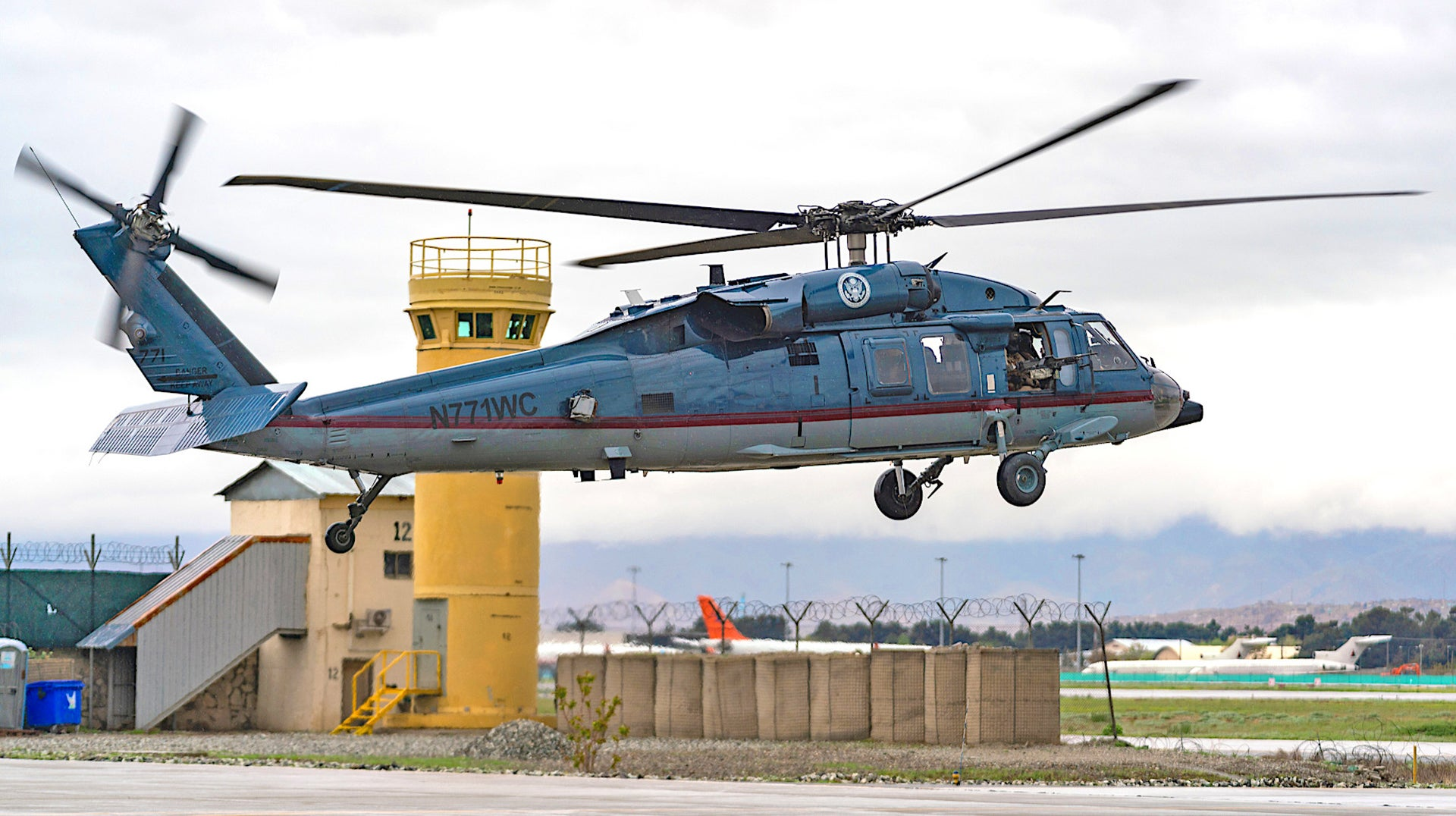
An ex-US Army MEDEVAC HH-60L flying for "Embassy Air" transports Secretary of State Antony Blinken in Kabul, Afghanistan in April 2021.

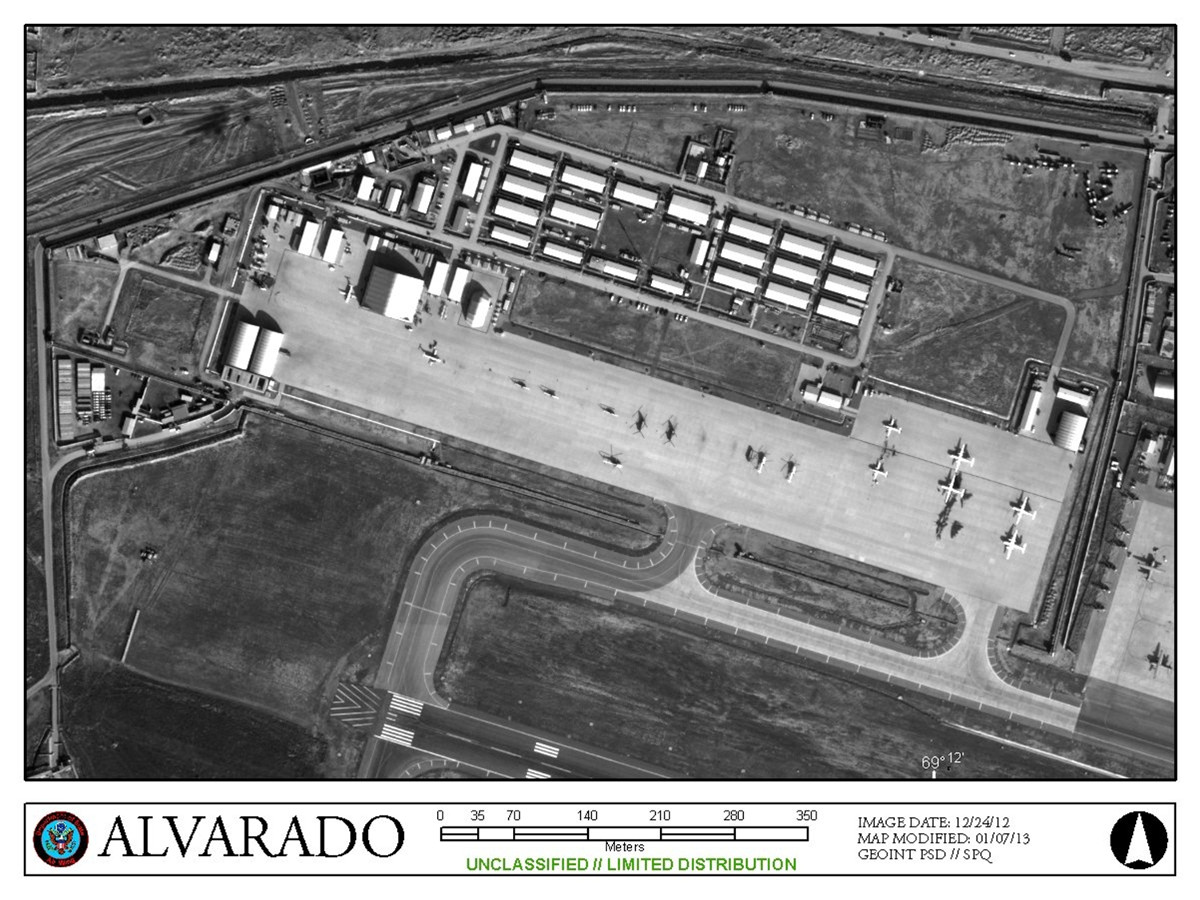
The Air Wing's former Kabul, Afghanistan base at the Camp Alvarado annex

As of January 2018, the Air Wing employed 206 aircraft of a variety of types, including various fixed wing aircraft, rotorcraft, and unmanned aerial vehicles (UAV); this figure is down from a high of 240 in 2010. The office's cooperative model with often poor and developing partner nations has resulted in its fleet being composed heavily of refurbished, second-hand aircraft, and a number of newer but cheaper models that partner nations can afford to maintain when the aircraft is transferred.

The Air Wing has increasingly moved away from the Sikorsky S-61T as it acquires CH-46 Sea Knights from the U.S. Marine Corps, as the latter seeks to replace it with V-22 Osprey tiltrotors.

Fixed-wing assets include the popular Cessna 208 Caravan and the Air Tractor AT-802 crop duster, the latter used to spray herbicides over drug fields. In the last decade, Air Wing Huey IIs and C-27A transports have deployed to Iraq and Afghanistan to help develop the air forces of those countries.

Previously, the Air Wing maintained a fleet of Fairchild-Dornier 328s, North American Rockwell OV-10 Broncos, and deeply obsolete Douglas DC-3s.

In 2021, the Air Wing added ex-US Army HH-60L Blackhawk MEDEVAC helicopters to its fleet, identifiable by black nose extensions retained from Army service where they were used for mounting sensors, though in Air Wing service none have been equipped.

| Craft | No. | Type | Use |
|---|---|---|---|
| AeroVironment RQ-11B Raven | 5 | UAV | Surveillance |
| Pilatus PC-6 Porter | 1 | Fixed wing | |
| Air Tractor AT-802 | 2 | Fixed wing | Crop dusting |
| Cessna 208-8 Caravan | 3 | Fixed wing | |
| Beechcraft 1900 | 7 | Fixed wing | |
| Bombardier Dash 8 | 8 | Fixed wing | Transport |
| McDonnell Douglas MD-530 Little Bird | 4 | Rotary | |
| HH-60L Black Hawk | 22 | Rotary | |
| Boeing Vertol CH-46E Sea Knight | 23 | Rotary | Transport |
| Bell UH-1H II (Huey II) | 118 | Rotary | Transport |

== Activities ==
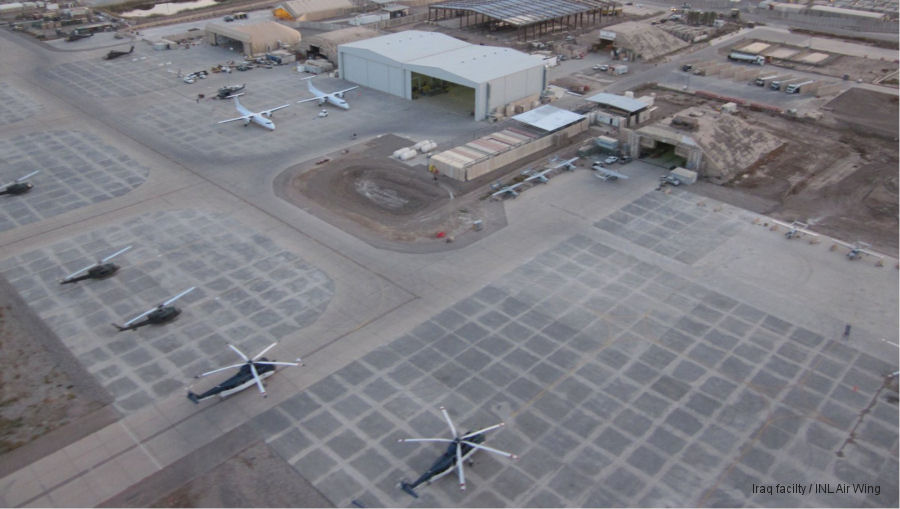
The Air Wing's current base in Iraq.

=== War on Terror ===
In Iraq and Afghanistan, private contractor DynCorp was contracted to fly State Department aircraft in the "Embassy Air" program, completing more than 32,000 regularly scheduled flights per year. Most of these aircraft carried weapons mounted when flying over unsecured areas of Iraq and Afghanistan.

==== Evacuation of the US embassy in Afghanistan ====
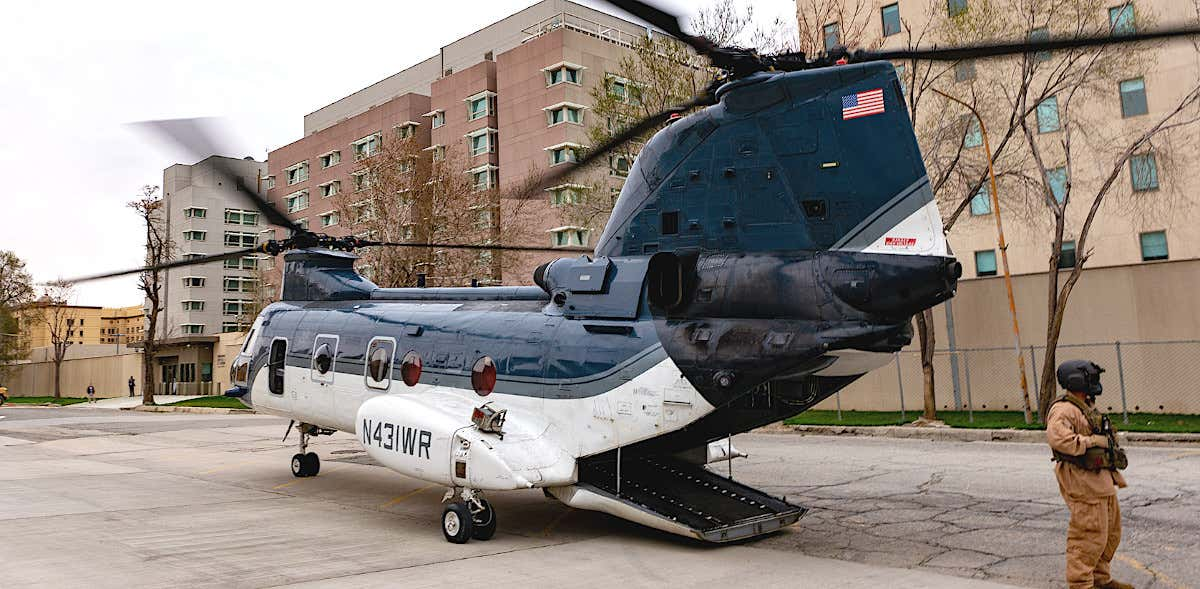
An Air Wing "Embassy Air" CH-46 Sea Knight at the US Embassy, Kabul, in April 2021. Months later it would evacuate diplomats from the facility.

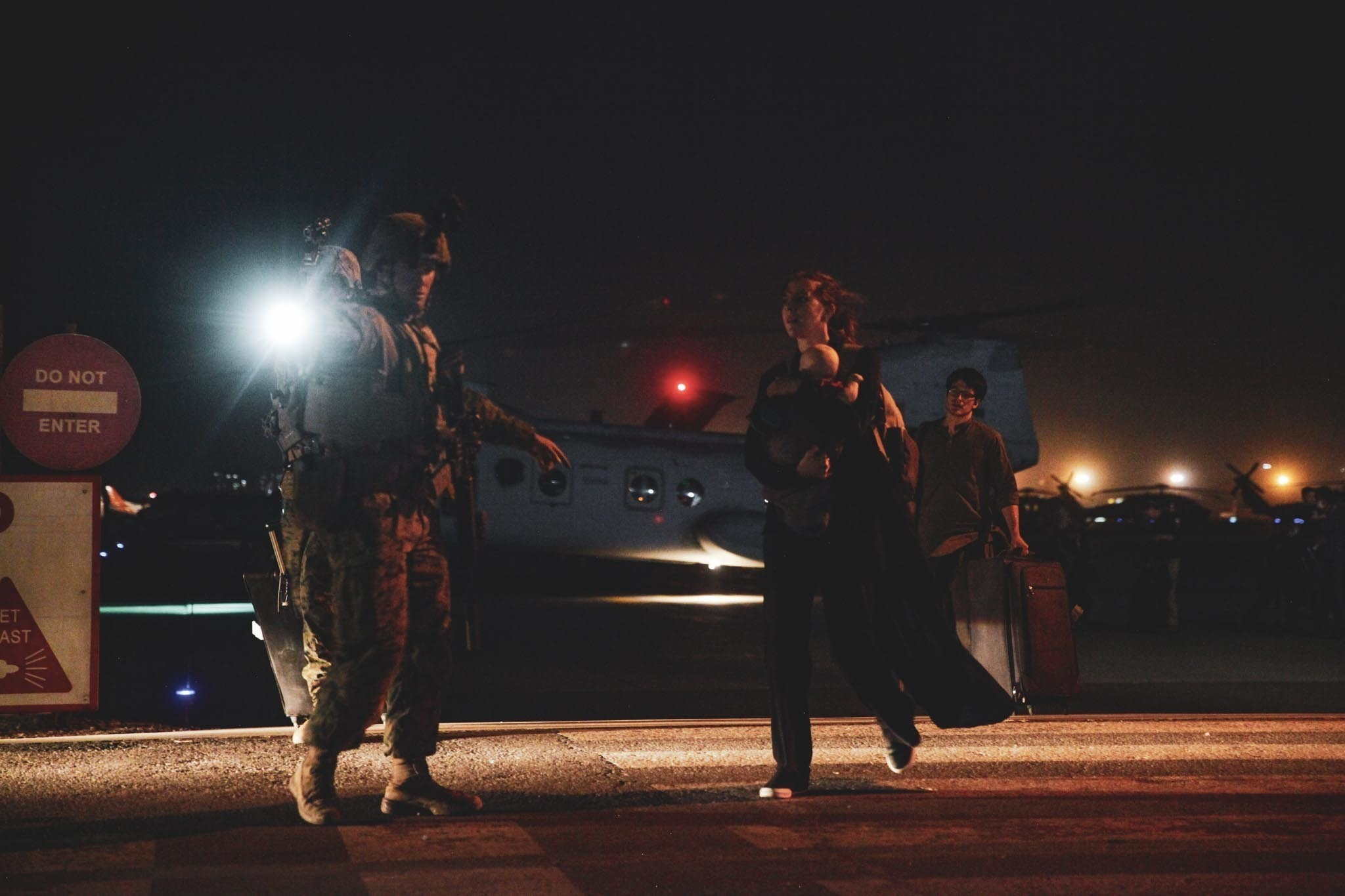
One of the seven Air Wing Sea Knights during the Kabul Airlift.

During the Fall of Kabul in August 2021, Blackhawk and Sea Knight helicopters of the Air Wing operated in conjunction with US Army CH-47 Chinook helicopters to evacuate the US embassy in Kabul as the Taliban seized control of the city. A photo taken of the flight operations showing a CH-47 landing behind an embassy building was compared to a photo of a Marine Sea Knight evacuating the last Americans from the US embassy in Saigon during the Fall of Saigon, while one of Air Wing Sea Knights flying the rescue operations in Kabul was also in fact previously employed during the evacuation of Saigon. Following the evacuation, seven CH-46's were made inoperable and abandoned at the airport.

=== Cyprus air base ===
In 2013, the Air Wing established an air base on the island of Cyprus. The expressed purpose of the facility, which housed five helicopters and approximately 40 State Department and contractor personnel, was to provide flexibility to support evacuations throughout the Middle East in the wake of the 2012 Benghazi attack and the Syrian civil war spillover in Lebanon. The Office of the Inspector General in 2017 determined that the base represented "nearly $71 million dollars in potentially unnecessary expenditures", and that it was established without the approval of the Department’s Aviation Governing Board. OIG wrote that the Department was unable to produce any records from the time the base began operating that “explained the purpose of the base, the anticipated cost of any evacuation services or the likely extent of its usage. Similarly, no documentation could be found addressing potential alternatives to this facility.”

Patrick Kennedy, a State Department official who made the decision to establish the base, defended the decision as a necessary precaution after criticism of the response to the attacks on the embassy in Benghazi, asking a reporter from ABC News "If you buy insurance and never use it, did you make a mistake?" Use of the facility in Cyprus was ultimately discontinued in 2017.

== External sources ==
- Official website
- Archived INL Air Wing website
