= David T. Johnson =

American diplomat

10th Assistant Secretary of State for International Narcotics and Law Enforcement Affairs
- In office October 31, 2007 – January 10, 2011
- Preceded by: Anne W. Patterson
- Succeeded by: William Brownfield

Personal details
- Born: 1954 (age 71–72)
- Education: Emory University (BA); Royal Military College of Canada

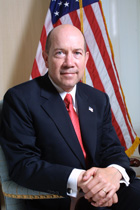
David T. Johnson

David Timothy Johnson (born 1954) is a member of the International Narcotics Control Board and retired United States diplomat and the former Assistant Secretary of State for International Narcotics and Law Enforcement Affairs.

== Biography ==
David T. Johnson was raised in Georgia and educated at Emory University, from which he received a B.A. in Economics in 1976. He spent a year working in the Office of the Comptroller of the Currency before joining the United States Foreign Service in 1977. In the course of his career in the Foreign Service, Johnson focused on European security affairs and served as desk officer for Berlin, Austria, and Switzerland; an economic officer at the Embassy of the United States in Berlin; and a vice consul at the U.S. Consulate General in Ciudad Juárez. He later served as Deputy Spokesman at the State Department and Director of the State Department Press Office; United States Consul General in Vancouver; and Deputy Director of the State Department's Operations Center. He spent 1988-89 studying at the Royal Military College of Canada.

In 1995, Johnson became Deputy Press Secretary for Foreign Affairs at the White House and Spokesman for the United States National Security Council. In January 1998, he became United States ambassador to the Organization for Security and Co-operation in Europe, a position he held until December 2001. In May 2002, with the advent of the War in Afghanistan, Johnson became the United States Department of State's Coordinator for Afghanistan, a position he held until July 2003. In August 2003, he became Deputy Chief of Mission at the U.S. Embassy, London.

In 2007, President of the United States George W. Bush nominated Johnson as Assistant Secretary of State for International Narcotics and Law Enforcement Affairs. Following Senate confirmation, he was sworn into office on October 31, 2007.

Since 2012, he has been a member of the International Narcotics Control Board (INCB).

Government offices
Preceded by Anne W. Patterson	Assistant Secretary of State for International Narcotics and Law Enforcement Affairs; October 31, 2007 – January 10, 2011	Succeeded by William R. Brownfield
Preceded by Sam W. Brown, Jr.	United States Ambassador to the Organization for Security and Cooperation in Europe; 1998 — 2001	Succeeded by Stephan M. Minikes
