= Nicholas Platt =

American diplomat (1936–2026)

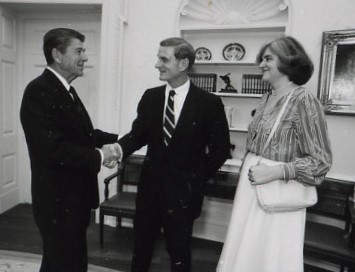
- Nicholas Platt, center, with his wife Sheila and President Reagan, 1982

United States Ambassador to Pakistan
- In office 1991–1992
- President: George H. W. Bush
- Preceded by: Robert B. Oakley
- Succeeded by: John Cameron Monjo

United States Ambassador to the Philippines
- In office 1987–1991
- President: Ronald Reagan; George H. W. Bush
- Preceded by: Stephen W. Bosworth
- Succeeded by: Frank G. Wisner

United States Ambassador to Zambia
- In office 1982–1984
- President: Ronald Reagan
- Preceded by: Frank G. Wisner
- Succeeded by: Paul J. Hare

11th Executive Secretary of the United States Department of State
- In office 1985–1987
- Preceded by: Charles Hill
- Succeeded by: Melvyn Levitsky

Personal details
- Born: March 10, 1936 New York City, U.S.
- Died: July 23, 2026 (aged 90)
- Spouse: Sheila Maynard (m. 1957)
- Children: 3, including Oliver and Adam
- Education: Harvard College; Johns Hopkins SAIS
- Occupation: Diplomat

Nicholas Platt (March 10, 1936 – July 23, 2026) was an American diplomat who served as U.S. Ambassador Extraordinary and Plenipotentiary to Pakistan, Philippines, Zambia, and as a high level diplomat in Canada, the People's Republic of China, Hong Kong and Japan. He was a past president of the Asia Society in New York City.

== Early years ==
Platt was born in New York City on March 10, 1936. He was the son of Helen (née Choate) Platt and architect Geoffrey Platt.

His maternal grandfather was Joseph H. Choate Jr., and his great-grandfather was diplomat and lawyer Joseph Hodges Choate, who was appointed U.S. Ambassador to the United Kingdom in 1899 by President William Mckinley. Joseph's brother, William Gardner Choate, established Choate Rosemary Hall.

Platt graduated from the prep school St. Paul's School, Harvard College (B.A., 1957), and Johns Hopkins University School of Advanced International Studies (M.A., 1959). At Harvard, he was a member of the Hasty Pudding Club and the Porcellian Club. He spoke Chinese, German, French, and Japanese.

== Career ==
Platt began his career as a research assistant at the Washington Center for Foreign Policy Research before entering the Foreign Service of the United States in 1959. Reportedly, he was inspired to join the Foreign Service by his great-grandfather, Ambassador Joseph Hodges Choate. From 1959 to 1961, he served as vice consul in Windsor, Ontario, Canada. From 1962 to 1963, he studied the Chinese language at the Foreign Service Institute and in Taichung, Taiwan. In 1964, he was assigned as political officer at the American consulate general in Hong Kong until 1968, when he became China desk officer in the Bureau of East Asian and Pacific Affairs.

From 1969 to 1971, Platt was chief of the Asian Communist Areas Division of the Bureau of Intelligence and Research. From 1971 to 1973, he served as Deputy Director, and then Director, of the Secretariat Staff in the Department of State. As a young diplomat, Platt accompanied President Richard Nixon on the historic trip to Beijing in 1972 that signaled the resumption of relations between the U.S. and China.

He was assigned as chief of the political section, U.S. Liaison Office, Peking, PRC, 1973 to 1974, and then as deputy chief of the political section at the Embassy in Tokyo, Japan, 1974 to 1977. He returned to Washington to serve as Director for Japanese Affairs in 1977 and then served as a staff member on the National Security Council at the White House from 1978 to 1980. From 1980 to 1981, he was Deputy Assistant Secretary of Defense, International Security Affairs in the U.S. Department of Defense. From 1981 to 1982, he returned to the Department of State as Deputy Assistant Secretary, International Organization Affairs.

Platt shared his career experiences through several oral histories that he shared with the Association for Diplomatic Studies and Training and are now available as part of Frontline Diplomacy: The Foreign Affairs Oral History Collection, first in 1994 and again in 2005.

=== Ambassadorships ===
On July 22, 1982, President Reagan appointed Platt to succeed Frank G. Wisner as the U.S. Ambassador to Zambia. He presented his credentials on August 31, 1982 and served until he left his post on December 17, 1984 to become the Special Assistant to the Secretary of State and Executive Secretary of the U.S. Department of State. Platt stayed as Executive Secretary until February 13, 1987.

On August 10, 1987, he was again appointed by Reagan as the U.S. Ambassador to the Philippines, succeeding Stephen W. Bosworth. Platt presented his credentials on August 27, 1987 and served in this role through George H. W. Bush's election as president until he left his post on July 20, 1991, after receiving his subsequent appointment by President Bush, when he was replaced by Wisner.

On July 2, 1991, President Bush appointed Platt to succeed Robert B. Oakley as the U.S. Ambassador to Pakistan in Islamabad, where he remained until he left his post on November 3, 1992. He was succeeded as Ambassador by John Cameron Monjo.

=== Later career ===
Following his retirement from the State Department, in 1992 Platt began serving as the fifth president of Asia Society, a non-profit organization that focuses on educating the world about Asia. He also was a member of the Council on Foreign Relations in New York and was a member of the International Advisory Board of the Financial Times.

== Personal life and death ==
On June 28, 1957, he married Sheila Maynard at the Protestant Episcopal Church in Rhinebeck, New York. Sheila was a clinical social worker who worked in Islamabad. She was the daughter of Eileen (née Burden) and investment banker Walter Maynard (son of Walter E. Maynard), and the maternal-granddaughter of banker and equestrian Arthur Scott Burden, and the Hon. Cynthia Burke Roche. The couple had three sons Adam Platt, a restaurant critic for New York Magazine. Oliver Platt (b. 1960), an actor. and Nicholas Platt Jr.

Platt frequently spent his summers in North Haven, Maine.

Platt died on July 23, 2026, at the age of 90. His death was announced via his son Oliver's Instagram page on July 27.

Diplomatic posts
Preceded by Frank G. Wisner	United States Ambassador to Zambia; 1982–1984	Succeeded by Paul J. Hare
Preceded by Stephen W. Bosworth	United States Ambassador to the Philippines; 1987–1991	Succeeded by Frank G. Wisner
Preceded by Robert B. Oakley	United States Ambassador to Pakistan; 1991–1992	Succeeded by John Cameron Monjo
