= Robert S. Gelbard =

American diplomat (born 1944)

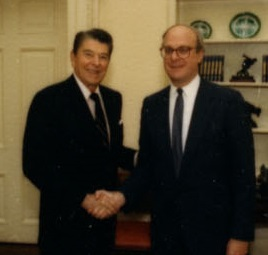
- President Ronald Reagan with Robert S. Gelbard

United States Ambassador to Indonesia
- In office October 18, 1999 – October 14, 2001
- President: Bill Clinton
- Preceded by: J. Stapleton Roy
- Succeeded by: Ralph Leo Boyce

United States Ambassador to Bolivia
- In office October 11, 1988 – July 20, 1991
- President: Ronald Reagan; George H.W Bush
- Preceded by: Edward Morgan Rowell
- Succeeded by: Charles R. Bowers

6th Assistant Secretary of State for International Narcotics and Law Enforcement Affairs
- In office November 23, 1993 – April 10, 1997
- Preceded by: Melvyn Levitsky
- Succeeded by: Rand Beers

Personal details
- Born: March 6, 1944 (age 82) New York City, New York, U.S.
- Education: Colby College; Harvard University

Robert Sidney Gelbard (born March 6, 1944) is an American diplomat and former United States Ambassador to Bolivia (1988–1991) and Indonesia (1999–2001). He is a member of the American Academy of Diplomacy, and is a 1964 graduate of Colby College and a 1979 graduate of the Harvard Kennedy School, where he received a Master of Public Administration.

In the Clinton administration, he was an envoy to the Balkans. In the Spring of 1998, he met with Slobodan Milosevic and warned him about NATO's possible use of military force against Serbia. By May 1998, he suggested to the White House that they bomb Serbia, but the idea was originally rejected by NSA Sandy Berger.

In February of that year, Gelbard described the Kosovo Liberation Army, Milosevic's foe in the Kosovo war as "without any questions, a terrorist group" and added that "we condemn very strongly terrorist activities in Kosovo."

Gelbard currently sits on the Atlantic Council's Board of Directors.

== Lobbying activities ==
Gelbard is the founder and chairman of Washington Global Partners LLC, a lobbying and consulting outfit based in Washington, DC. In October 2011, the Economist reported that Gelbard lobbied to discredit the International Commission against Impunity in Guatemala and its current director, Francisco Dall'Anese. Dall'Anese suggested that the lobbying campaign was funded by private sector opponents of the Commission's investigation of Guatemala's wealthy former interior minister, Carlos Vielmann, on charges of orchestrating extrajudicial killings. In February 2012, Gelbard joined the public policy and regulation practice at SNR Denton. In response to the accusations concerning the International Commission against Impunity in Guatemala, Gelbard wrote in The Economist: "Based on two decades of experience in democratic institution-building, law enforcement and counter-narcotics, I have criticised the overall efforts of Francisco Dall'Anese, who heads CICIG, as being not aggressive enough compared with those of Carlos Castresana, his predecessor, and in light of the dire situation facing Guatemala."

Government offices
Preceded by Melvyn Levitsky	Assistant Secretary of State for International Narcotics Matters; November 23, 1993 – April 10, 1997	Succeeded by Rand Beers
Diplomatic posts
Preceded by Edward Morgan Rowell	United States Ambassador to Bolivia; 1988–1991	Succeeded by Charles R. Bowers
Preceded by J. Stapleton Roy	United States Ambassador to Indonesia; 1999–2001	Succeeded by Ralph L. Boyce
