= Mathea Falco =

American lawyer (born 1944)

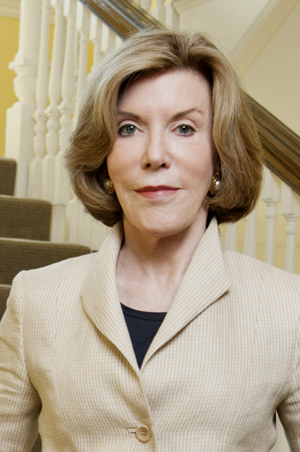

1st Assistant Secretary of State for International Narcotics Matters
- In office February 6, 1979 – January 21, 1981
- President: Jimmy Carter
- Preceded by: Position established
- Succeeded by: Dominick L. DiCarlo

Personal details
- Born: October 15, 1944 (age 82)
- Spouse: Peter Tarnoff
- Children: 1
- Education: Radcliffe College (BA); Yale University (JD)

Kathleen Mathea Falco (born October 15, 1944) is an American lawyer who is an expert in drug abuse prevention and treatment who served as the first U.S. Assistant Secretary of State for International Narcotics and Law Enforcement Affairs during the Carter Administration. Currently, Falco is the President of Drug Strategies, a nonprofit research institute based in Washington, D.C., which she created with the support of major foundations in 1993 to identify and promote more effective approaches to substance abuse and international drug policy.

== Biography ==
Falco received her B.A. from Radcliffe College in 1965 and her J.D. from Yale Law School in 1968. In 1971, Falco became the first woman to serve as Chief Counsel and Staff Director of a major U.S. Senate subcommittee (United States Senate Subcommittee on Juvenile Delinquency) which had jurisdiction over the Federal laws governing juvenile delinquency, controlled substances, pornography and gun control. In 1977, Secretary of State Cyrus Vance appointed Falco Senior Adviser to the Secretary of State for International Narcotics Matters.

In 1979, President Jimmy Carter nominated Falco to the newly created position of Assistant Secretary of State for International Narcotics Matters (currently known as the Assistant Secretary of State for International Narcotics and Law Enforcement Affairs) a post she held until January 21, 1981. During her four years at the State Department, Falco also led the U.S. delegation to the annual meetings of the United Nations Commission on Narcotic Drugs.

After leaving government in 1981, Falco continued her work in drug policy, serving as a consultant to the Carnegie Corporation of New York, the Ford Foundation's U.S.-Mexico Commission, the Edna McConnell Clark Foundation, and other non-profit organizations. Having served as a member of the board of trustees for Radcliffe College for over a decade from 1967 to 1979, Falco was later elected to the Harvard Board of Overseers for a six-year term starting in 1985. Between 1989 and 1992, she served as Chair of the Visiting Committee on Harvard University Health Services. From 1993 to 1994, Falco was a Senior Associate at the Carnegie Endowment for International Peace.

Falco is currently a visiting scholar at the Harvard Law School Program for International Criminal Justice. From 2003 to 2009, she was an associate professor at the Weill Cornell Medical College Department of Public Health in New York and from 2005 to 2007, she was a Fellow at Harvard University's Weatherhead Center for International Affairs. In addition to numerous articles and book chapters, Falco is the author of The Making of a Drug-Free America: Programs That Work. Falco comments frequently in the media on drug abuse research and policy, including NPR, HBO, ABC, NBC, and PBS's NewsHour. She is a member of the Council on Foreign Relations as well as a member of the Board of Directors of the National Center for Youth Law and the Treatment Research Institute at the University of Pennsylvania. Falco was a member of the Institute of Medicine of the National Academies Committees on "Prevention, Diagnosis, Treatment, and Management of Substance Use Disorders in the U.S. Armed Forces" and "Prevention of HIV Infection among Injecting Drug Users in High Risk Countries". From 2013 to 2016, Falco was also a member of the U.S. Food and Drug Administration Drug Safety Advisory Committee. Falco is Chair of Trustees, Irawaddy Policy Exchange (UK Trust).

Falco co-hosted two working groups on transnational organized crime at Harvard Law School in 2011 which were attended by policy experts from the United States, Mexico, Colombia, and Spain, including a number of Mexican officials at the federal, state, and local levels. In 2015, she co-hosted a two-day symposium at the Radcliffe Institute for Advanced Studies at Harvard University to address lessons from the United States' 40-year war on drugs. Multidisciplinary experts gathered to explore innovative approaches to drug policy and programs. In 2016, Falco was elected to the American Academy of Arts and Sciences.

== Personal ==
Falco, who was married to the late Peter Tarnoff, has one son, Benjamin F. Tarnoff.

Government offices
| Preceded by None | Assistant Secretary of State for International Narcotics Matters; February 6, 1979 – January 21, 1981 | Succeeded by Dominick L. DiCarlo |
