= Ann B. Wrobleski =

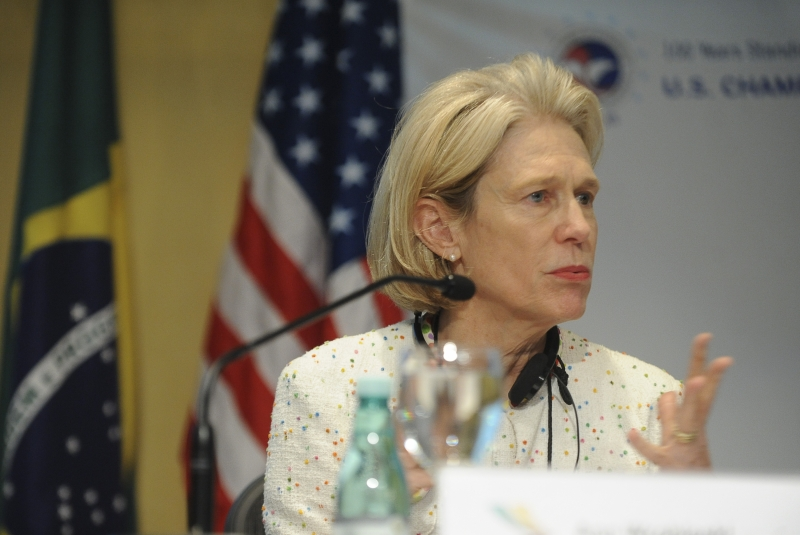
- Wrobleski in October 2012

4th Assistant Secretary of State for International Narcotics Matters
- In office September 30, 1986 – June 17, 1989
- President: Ronald Reagan; George H. W. Bush
- Preceded by: Jon R. Thomas
- Succeeded by: Melvyn Levitsky

Personal details
- Born: April 3, 1952 (age 74) Fort Lauderdale, Florida, U.S.
- Education: Stephens College
- Known for: Architect of the "Just Say No" campaign

Ann Barbara Wrobleski (born 1952) was the architect of Nancy Reagan's "Just Say No" campaign and later United States Assistant Secretary of State for International Narcotics Matters from 1986 to 1989.

== Biography ==
=== Early life ===
Ann B. Wrobleski was born in Fort Lauderdale, Florida, on April 3, 1952. She was educated at Stephens College, receiving a B.A. in 1972. Her first job after college was working as press secretary for Senator Edward Gurney (R–FL). In 1974, she served as traveling press secretary for Jack Eckerd in his attempt to win election to the United States Senate (he lost to Democrat Richard Stone).

=== Career ===
In 1975 (after Gurney had been forced to resign after he was implicated in an influence peddling scandal and Eckerd had lost in his election), Wrobleski became press secretary for Rep. Louis Frey, Jr. (R–FL-5). She also worked as a research assistant for the House Republican Research Committee during this period. In 1978, she again served as Jack Eckerd's traveling press secretary, this time in Eckerd's campaign to become Governor of Florida. (He lost again, this time to Democrat Bob Graham.) She spent 1979-80 working as deputy press secretary and director of scheduling for Senator Richard Stone.

In 1981, Wrobleski became Special Projects Director for First Lady Nancy Reagan at the White House. In this capacity, she played a critical role in developing Nancy Reagan's "Just Say No" campaign, designed to discourage recreational drug use amongst children and teenagers.

Wrobleski joined the United States Department of State in 1985 as Deputy Assistant Secretary of State for International Narcotics Matters. She served as Acting Assistant Secretary of State for International Narcotics Matters from May until September 1986, at which time she became President Ronald Reagan's third Assistant Secretary of State for International Narcotics Matters. She held this office from September 30, 1986, until June 17, 1989.

Upon leaving government service, Wrobleski joined Jefferson Waterman International, a lobbying firm. After nine years at Jefferson Waterman International, she joined the American Forest & Paper Association as Vice President (International). In 2005, she joined International Paper as Vice President (Public Affairs).

== Sources ==
- Bio from Reagan archive
- IP Press Release

Government offices
Preceded by Jon R. Thomas	Assistant Secretary of State for International Narcotics Matters; September 30, 1986 – June 17, 1989	Succeeded by Melvyn Levitsky
