= New York Law Revision Commission =

Legislative commission for law reform in New York State, USA

The New York State Law Revision Commission is the oldest continuous agency in the common law world devoted to law reform through legislation.

== Legal mandate ==
The Law Revision Commission was created by Chapter 597 of the Laws of 1934 which enacted Article 4-A of the Legislative Law. The Commission is charged by statute with the following duties:

- To examine the common law and statutes of the State and current judicial decisions for the purpose of discovering defects and anachronisms in the law and recommending needed reforms.
- To receive and consider proposed changes in the law recommended by the American Law Institute, the commissioners for the promotion of uniformity of legislation in the United States, any bar association or other learned bodies.
- To receive and consider suggestions from judges, justices, public officials, lawyers and the public generally as to defects and anachronisms in the law.
- To recommend, from time to time, such changes in the law as it deems necessary to modify or eliminate antiquated and inequitable rules of law, and to bring the law of this state, civil and criminal, into harmony with modern conditions.

== Reports ==
From 1934 to 1970 the Reports of the Law Revision Commission were published in the Law Revisions Commission Reports. From 1950 to 1970 the basic Commission Report to the legislature was also published in McKinney's Session Laws, while the Commissions' studies on possible legislation were published separately. Since 1970 the whole report has been published in McKinney's Session Laws.
