= Craig A. Kelly =

American diplomat (born 1953)

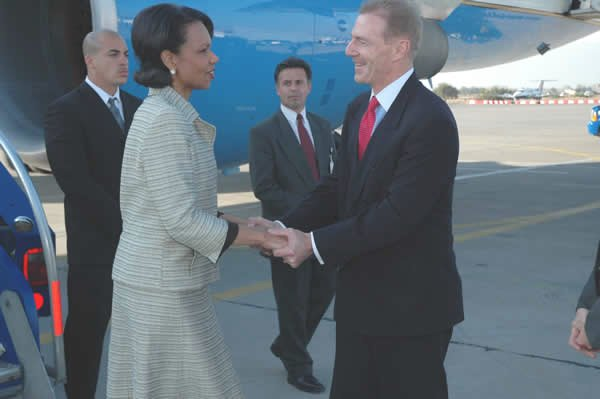
Craig A. Kelly greets Condoleezza Rice upon arrival in Santiago International Airport, April 28, 2005

Craig Allen Kelly (born 1953) is a United States diplomat. He was US Ambassador to Chile from 2004 to 2007.

== Education ==
Ambassador Kelly attended Servite High School (Anaheim, California) and UCLA. He holds a PhD in Romance Languages and European History.

== Languages ==
Ambassador Kelly speaks Spanish, Italian, French and Portuguese.
