= Bureau of International Narcotics and Law Enforcement Affairs =

U.S. State Department division

- Seal of the United States Department of State

Bureau overview
- Formed: 1978; 48 years ago
- Jurisdiction: Executive branch of the United States
- Employees: 425 (FY 2013)
- Annual budget: $1.6 billion (FY 2013)
- Bureau executive: Frank Cartwright Weiland, Assistant Secretary of State for International Narcotics and Law Enforcement Affairs
- Parent department: U.S. Department of State
- Website: state.gov/inl

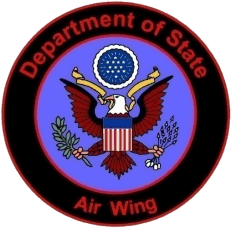
Logo of the "Air Wing" of The Bureau of International Narcotics and Law Enforcement Affairs (INL)- Office of Aviation, U.S. Department of State

The Bureau of International Narcotics and Law Enforcement Affairs (INL) is an agency that reports to the Under Secretary of State for Arms Control and International Security within the United States Department of State. Under the umbrella of its general mission of developing policies and programs to combat international narcotics and crime, INL plays an important role in the training of partner nation security forces.

The Bureau of International Narcotics and Law Enforcement Affairs (INL) implements programs aimed at addressing crime, illicit drug activity, and instability in foreign countries. Its efforts focus on four primary objectives: (1) disrupting and reducing illicit drug markets and transnational crime; (2) addressing corruption and illicit financial flows to reinforce democratic institutions and the rule of law; (3) enhancing the capacity of criminal justice systems to promote stable and rights-respecting governance; and (4) utilizing data, research, and strategic resources to support program goals. These counternarcotics and anticrime initiatives also contribute to broader counterterrorism efforts by supporting the modernization and operations of foreign criminal justice and law enforcement institutions involved in counterterrorism activities.

== Activities ==
The bureau manages the Department of State's Narcotics Rewards Program and Transnational Organized Crime Rewards Program in close coordination with the Department of Justice, Department of Homeland Security, Immigration and Customs Enforcement (ICE), the Drug Enforcement Administration (DEA), Federal Bureau of Investigation (FBI), and other interested U.S. agencies.

INL is not a law enforcement organization but it specializes in managing large law enforcement training programs, e.g. in Afghanistan, Colombia, and Iraq.

The Bureau of International Narcotics and Law Enforcement Affairs, Office of Aviation (INL/A), is the aviation service provider in support of counter-narcotics, law enforcement, and overseas missions operations. The bureau has more than 200 fixed wing and rotary wing aircraft (including OV-10, AT-802 and C-27 planes and Hueys, Blackhawk and K-Max helicopters) involved in INL counter-narcotics aviation programs in Colombia, Peru, Bolivia, Guatemala, Pakistan, Costa Rica, and Afghanistan. About half of the aircraft are operating from Colombia and the rest are in Bolivia, Peru, Pakistan and Afghanistan. Actual operations and support were provided by DynCorp International, until 2017 when AAR Government Services took over the WASS (Worldwide Aviation Support Services) contract.

INL operations focused on dismantling fentanyl supply chains in Mexico were shut down in February 2025 due to budget cuts by the Trump administration. In addition, INL has supported maritime interdictions in Ecuador, resulting in multiple vessel seizures, large-scale cocaine confiscations, and numerous arrests of drug traffickers.

== See also ==
- Advance-fee fraud
- Diplomatic Security Service (DSS) - U.S. Department of State
- United States security assistance to the Palestinian National Authority
