= Mollison =

Mollison is a surname. Notable people with the surname include:

- Bill Mollison (1928–2016), researcher, author, scientist, teacher and naturalist
- Clifford Mollison (1897–1986), British film and television actor
- Deborah Mollison (born 1958), British composer and songwriter
- Derek Mollison (1901–1943), Australian footballer and businessman
- Fiona Mollison (born 1954), British television and theatre actress
- Henry Mollison (1905–1985), British film actor
- Irvin C. Mollison (1898–1962), American judge
- James Mollison (1931–2020), Australian gallerist
- James William Mollison (1858–1927), British agriculture specialist in India
- Jim Mollison (1905–1959), Scottish pioneer aviator who set many records
- Sam Mollison, electronic music producer and vocalist
- Theodor Mollison (1874–1952), German anthropologist
- William Loudon Mollison (1851–1929), Scottish mathematician and academic
- Willis Elbert Mollison (1859–1924), American teacher, newspaper editor, politician, banker, businessman, lawyer, public official, and civil rights advocate
- Lindsay Mollison, Australian physician and environmentalist
