= Homer D. Angell =

American politician (1875–1968)

Homer Angell
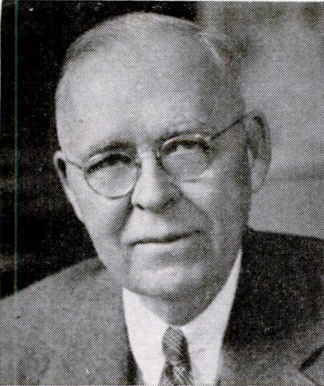

Member of the U.S. House of Representatives from Oregon's 3rd district
- In office January 3, 1939 – January 3, 1955
- Preceded by: Nan Wood Honeyman
- Succeeded by: Edith Green

Member of the Oregon Senate
- In office 1937

Member of the Oregon House of Representatives
- In office 1929; 1931; 1935

Personal details
- Born: January 12, 1875 The Dalles, Oregon, U.S.
- Died: March 31, 1968 (aged 93) Portland, Oregon, U.S.
- Resting place: Wilhelm’s Portland Memorial Funeral Home and Mausoleum
- Party: Republican
- Spouse: Margaret Clagget
- Education: University of Oregon; Columbia University

Homer Daniel Angell (January 12, 1875 – March 31, 1968) was an American lawyer and politician who served eight terms as a Republican U.S. congressman from Oregon from 1939 to 1955.

== Biography ==
Angell was born on a farm near The Dalles, Oregon in 1875. He received his undergraduate degree from the University of Oregon in 1900 and his law degree from Columbia University in 1903, after which he returned to Portland to begin his law practice.

== Political career ==
He was elected to the Oregon House of Representatives in 1929, 1931, and 1935 and the Oregon State Senate in 1937.

=== Congress ===
He resigned that seat in 1938 to run for the United States House of Representatives, representing Oregon's 3rd congressional district. Angell was elected and served eight terms. In 1954, Angell was defeated for the Republican nomination by future Oregon governor Tom McCall.

== Personal ==
Angell's first wife was Mayme Henton Angell; they married in 1908. She died in 1951 after a long illness. Angell married his long-time secretary Margaret Clagget after 1951, shortly before being sworn in for his seventh term.

=== Retirement and death ===
Following his surprise defeat in the 1954 Republican primary by journalist and future Oregon governor Tom McCall, Angell retired from politics and returned to Portland, where he remained active in the community until his death in 1968. He is interred at the Portland Memorial Funeral Home and Mausoleum.

U.S. House of Representatives
Preceded by Nan Wood Honeyman	Member of the U.S. House of Representatives from Oregon's 3rd congressional district 1939–1955	Succeeded by Edith Green
