= Thomas Joseph Walker =

American judge

Judge of the United States Customs Court
- In office June 20, 1940 – January 18, 1945
- Appointed by: Franklin D. Roosevelt
- Preceded by: Jerry Bartholomew Sullivan
- Succeeded by: Irvin Charles Mollison

Personal details
- Born: Thomas Joseph Walker; March 25, 1877 Plymouth, Pennsylvania, U.S.
- Died: January 18, 1945 (aged 67) New York City, New York, U.S.
- Education: Georgetown University; University of Virginia

Thomas Joseph Walker (March 25, 1877 – January 18, 1945) was a judge of the United States Customs Court.

== Education and career ==
Thomas Walker was born on March 25, 1877, in Plymouth, Pennsylvania, but moved with his family to Montana when he was thirteen. Walker attended Georgetown University and the University of Virginia but received no degrees. He served in the United States Armed Forces in 1898. He was elected to the Montana House of Representatives in 1905, and was a county attorney in Silver Bow County, Montana from 1906 to 1910. He worked in private law practice in Butte, Montana from 1909 to 1922 and again from 1934 to 1940. He was a member of the Montana Senate from 1922 to 1934.

== Federal judicial service ==
Walker was nominated by President Franklin D. Roosevelt on June 11, 1940, to a seat on the United States Customs Court vacated by Judge Jerry Bartholomew Sullivan. He was confirmed by the United States Senate on June 15, 1940, and received his commission on June 20, 1940. His service terminated on January 18, 1945, due to his death in New York City, New York.

== Sources ==
Legal offices
Preceded by Jerry Bartholomew Sullivan	Judge of the United States Customs Court; 1940–1945	Succeeded by Irvin Charles Mollison
