= William A. Ekwall =

American politician

William Alexander Ekwall
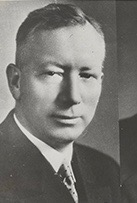

Judge of the United States Customs Court
- In office February 13, 1942 – October 16, 1956
- Appointed by: Franklin D. Roosevelt
- Preceded by: Walter Howard Evans
- Succeeded by: Scovel Richardson

Member of the U.S. House of Representatives from Oregon's 3rd district
- In office January 3, 1935 – January 3, 1937
- Preceded by: Charles H. Martin
- Succeeded by: Nan Wood Honeyman

Personal details
- Born: William Alexander Ekwall; June 14, 1887 Ludington, Michigan, U.S.
- Died: October 16, 1956 (aged 69) Portland, Oregon, U.S.
- Resting place: Portland Memorial Cemetery; Portland, Oregon
- Party: Republican
- Education: University of Oregon School of Law (LL.B.)

William Alexander Ekwall (June 14, 1887 – October 16, 1956) was an American politician, lawyer, and journalist who served one term as a United States representative from Oregon from 1935 to 1937. From 1942 to 1956, he served as a judge of the United States Customs Court.

== Education and career ==
Born in Ludington, Michigan to Alexander and Emilie Ekwall, both Swedish immigrants, Ekwall moved to Klamathon, California with his parents in 1893. In 1902, the town of Klamathon was destroyed in a massive fire, and the Ekwalls eventually made their way to Portland, Oregon in 1906. He attended the public schools and then the University of Oregon School of Law, then located in Portland, graduating in 1912 with a Bachelor of Laws.

=== Lawyer ===
He was admitted to the bar the same year and commenced practice in Portland in the firm Senn, Ekwall, and Recken. During World War I, Ekwall served in the United States Army as a private in the Infantry, attending the Central Officers Training School in 1918. After his Army service, he worked in Portland as a municipal judge from 1922 through 1927, and as Judge of the circuit court for the fourth judicial district (Multnomah County), department 8 until 1935.

== Congressional service ==
In 1934, Democrat Charles H. Martin, the incumbent United States Representative for Oregon's 3rd congressional district in Portland, announced that he would run for Governor of Oregon. Ekwall ran for Martin's congressional seat as a Republican, winning the May primary election and facing Walter B. Gleason, who two years earlier, had lost the 1932 United States Senate election to Frederick Steiwer. With several third-party candidates in the race, Ekwall earned a narrow 41%–38% plurality over Gleason and a seat in the United States House of Representatives of the 74th United States Congress. In Congress, Ekwall was known for a somewhat belligerent style. He once referred to Representative Wright Patman as a "stool pigeon" and Representative Marion Zioncheck as a "jackass."

=== Defeat ===
Ekwall sought re-election in 1936. He was challenged by Nan Wood Honeyman, a Portland community activist and family friend of President and Mrs. Roosevelt. Honeyman's aggressive door-to-door campaign, coupled with Roosevelt's landslide re-election, helped her defeat Ekwall, earning 51% of the vote to Ekwall's 33%. Following his loss, Ekwall returned to his Portland law practice, serving as a delegate to the Republican National Convention in 1940.

== Federal judicial service ==
Ekwall was nominated by President Franklin D. Roosevelt on January 19, 1942, to a seat on the United States Customs Court vacated by Judge Walter Howard Evans. He was confirmed by the United States Senate on February 9, 1942, and received his commission on February 13, 1942. Ekwall was initially appointed as a Judge under Article I, but the court was raised to Article III status by operation of law on July 14, 1956, and Ekwall thereafter served as an Article III Judge. His service terminated on October 16, 1956, due to his death.

== Death and burial ==
Ekwall died while on vacation in Portland on October 16, 1956. He was interred in Portland Memorial Cemetery.

Ekwall and his wife Lina and the couple had two daughters.

== Sources ==
- "William A. Ekwall". Biographical Directory of the United States Congress.

U.S. House of Representatives
Preceded by Charles H. Martin	Member of the U.S. House of Representatives from Oregon's 3rd congressional district 1935–1937	Succeeded by Nan Wood Honeyman
Legal offices
Preceded by Walter Howard Evans	Judge of the United States Customs Court; 1942–1956	Succeeded by Scovel Richardson
