= Henderson M. Somerville =

American judge

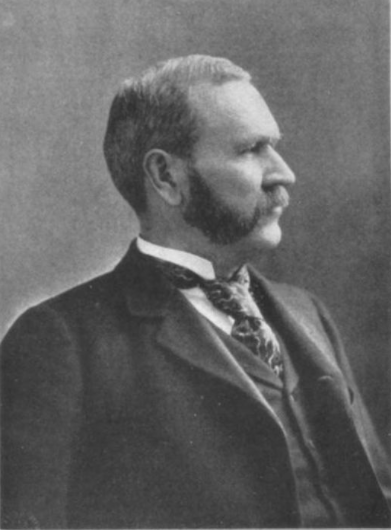

President of the Board of General Appraisers
- In office 1910–1914
- Preceded by: Marion De Vries
- Succeeded by: Jerry Bartholomew Sullivan

Member of the Board of General Appraisers
- In office July 22, 1890 – September 15, 1915
- Appointed by: Benjamin Harrison
- Preceded by: Seat established by 26 Stat. 131
- Succeeded by: William C. Adamson

Associate Justice of the Alabama Supreme Court
- In office 1872–1890

Personal details
- Born: Henderson Middleton Somerville; March 23, 1837 Madison County, Virginia, U.S.
- Died: September 15, 1915 (aged 78) Edgemere, New York, U.S.
- Education: Georgetown College of Kentucky & Southwestern University of Tennessee (J.D.); University of Alabama (B.A.); Cumberland School of Law (LL.B.)

Henderson Middleton Somerville (March 23, 1837 – September 15, 1915) was a professor, associate justice of the Alabama Supreme Court and a member of the Board of General Appraisers, which was the predecessor of the United States Court of International Trade.

== Education and career ==
Somerville was born on March 23, 1837, in Madison County, Virginia, but his family moved to Alabama in his infancy. He received a Bachelor of Arts degree in 1856 from University of Alabama. Somerville received a Bachelor of Laws degree in 1859 from the Cumberland School of Law (then part of Cumberland University, now part of Samford University). He entered private practice in Memphis, Tennessee from 1859 to 1862. Somerville was the editor of Memphis Appeal from 1859 to 1862. He was an associate professor at the University of Alabama from 1862 to 1865. He worked in private practice in Tuscaloosa, Alabama from 1865 to 1873. He became Chair of constitutional, statutory and common law at the University of Alabama in 1873, effectively establishing the University of Alabama School of Law, and continued to hold this position until 1890. He served as an associate justice of the Alabama Supreme Court from 1872 to 1890. Juris Doctor degrees were conferred by Georgetown College of Kentucky and Southwestern University of Tennessee.

=== Notable opinion ===
While serving on the Alabama Supreme Court, Somerville authored the opinion in the case of Parsons v. State, "which announced the modern doctrine of insanity as a disease of the brain", which "was met with great acclaim in both the medical and legal communities".

== Federal judicial service ==
Somerville was nominated by President Benjamin Harrison on July 17, 1890, to the Board of General Appraisers, to a new seat created by 26 Stat. 131. He was confirmed by the United States Senate on July 18, 1890, and received his commission on July 22, 1890. He served as president from 1910 to 1914. His service terminated on September 15, 1915, due to his death in Edgemere, New York. He was succeeded by William C. Adamson.

== Sources ==
- "Board of General Appraisers: Somerville, Henderson Middleton - Federal Judicial Center". www.fjc.gov.

Legal offices
Preceded by Seat established by 26 Stat. 131	Member of the Board of General Appraisers; 1890–1915	Succeeded by William C. Adamson
Preceded by Marion De Vries	President of the Board of General Appraisers; 1910–1914	Succeeded by Jerry Bartholomew Sullivan
