= Jane A. Restani =

American judge (born 1948)

Senior Judge of the United States Court of International Trade
- Incumbent
- Assumed office March 1, 2015

Chief Judge of the United States Court of International Trade
- In office November 1, 2003 – November 1, 2010
- Preceded by: Gregory W. Carman
- Succeeded by: Donald C. Pogue

Judge of the United States Court of International Trade
- In office November 16, 1983 – March 1, 2015
- Appointed by: Ronald Reagan
- Preceded by: Herbert N. Maletz
- Succeeded by: Gary Katzmann

Personal details
- Born: Jane Ann Restani; February 27, 1948 (age 78) San Francisco, California, U.S.
- Education: University of California, Berkeley (BA); University of California, Davis (JD)

Jane Ann Restani (born February 27, 1948, in San Francisco, California) is a senior United States Judge of the United States Court of International Trade. She was appointed to the Court on November 16, 1983, by President Ronald Reagan. She served as Chief Judge of the Court from 2003 to 2010.

== Early life and education ==
Born in San Francisco, California, Restani graduated first in her class in 1966 from Mercy High School, in San Francisco. She received a Bachelor of Arts degree in 1969 in political science, cum laude, from the University of California, Berkeley, where she was a member of the Tower and Flame Honor Society. She received teaching credentials in 1970 from the University of California, Berkeley. In 1973, she received her Juris Doctor (fifth in her class) at the University of California, Davis School of Law. She was a law review staff writer in her second year, and articles editor in her third. She was a member of the Order of the Coif and Phi Kappa Phi.

== Department of Justice career ==
She was admitted to practice law in California in 1973 and began her legal career in the Civil Division of the Justice Department, where she served as a trial attorney from 1973 to 1976. She served as assistant chief of the Commercial Litigation Branch of the Civil Division from 1976 to 1980. She served as Director of the Commercial Litigation Branch of the Civil Division from 1980 to 1983.

== Trade Court service ==
On November 3, 1983, President Reagan nominated Restani to serve as a Judge of the United States Court of International Trade, to the seat vacated by Judge Herbert N. Maletz. She was confirmed by the United States Senate on November 15, 1983, and received her commission the following day. She served as the Chief Judge from November 1, 2003, to November 1, 2010. She assumed senior status on March 1, 2015.

== Notable decisions ==
In 2006, Restani sat by designation on a United States Court of Appeals for the Second Circuit panel hearing Bill Graham Archives v. Dorling Kindersley, Ltd., in which the plaintiff appealed a holding that the defendant's unlicensed use of several images of Grateful Dead concert posters in its coffee-table history of the band was fair use and not copyright infringement. Restani wrote the unanimous opinion affirming the district court, holding that since the images had been used transformatively, the archives could not assert market harm, and that the publisher's negotiations for a licensing fee did not foreclose them from later asserting fair use.

On May 28, 2025, the panel on which Judge Restani sat ruled that the International Emergency Economic Powers Act of 1977 did not authorize President Trump to impose the Liberation Day tariffs.

== Professional honors and activities ==
- Member, Bankruptcy-Consumer and Commercial Subcommittee of the Corporation, Banking and Business Law Committee of the American Bar Association
- Senior Executive Service Outstanding Performance Rating, September 1981
- Civil Division Performance Award, May 1980
- Meritorious Award, December 1979
- Outstanding Performance Rating, March 1979
- Department of Justice Special Achievement Award, October 1976
- Attorney General's Special Commendation, December 1975
- Guest Lecturer on Debtor-Creditor Law, Antioch School of Law
- Author, "Bankruptcy," Civil Division Practice Manual

== Sources ==
- "Chief Judge Jane A. Restani". Administrative Office of the United States Courts. Archived from the original on May 2, 2008. "Career Record: 1973-76, trial attorney, Attorney General's Honor Program, 1976-80, Assistant Chief, Commercial Litigation Section, 1980-83, Director, Commercial Litigation Branch, all with Civil Division, Department of Justice. Admitted to California Supreme Court Bar, 1973."
- Restani, Jane A. (Fall 2006). "A SPECIAL YEAR IN THE LIFE OF THE UNITED STATES COURT OF INTERNATIONAL TRADE". Georgetown Journal of International Law. "Chief Judge Emeritus Edward D. Re, Jr., the founding chief judge of the Court..."
- "Jane A Restani". Carroll's Federal Directory. Carroll Publishing. 2008 [2006]. K2415003088. Reproduced in Biography Resource Center. Farmington Hills, Michigan. Gale, 2008.

Legal offices
Preceded by Herbert N. Maletz	Judge of the United States Court of International Trade; 1983–2015	Succeeded by Gary Katzmann
Preceded by Gregory W. Carman	Chief Judge of the United States Court of International Trade; 2003–2010	Succeeded by Donald C. Pogue
