= Thaddeus S. Sharretts =

Appraiser (1850–1926)

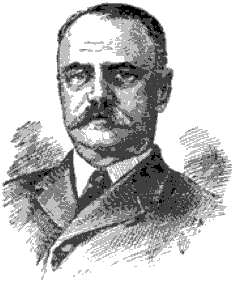

Member of the Board of General Appraisers
- In office July 30, 1890 – March 3, 1913
- Appointed by: Benjamin Harrison
- Preceded by: Seat established by 26 Stat. 131
- Succeeded by: Jerry Bartholomew Sullivan

Personal details
- Born: Thaddeus Stevens Sharretts; November 11, 1850 Montgomery County, Maryland, U.S.
- Died: February 26, 1926 (aged 75) Baltimore, Maryland, U.S.
- Spouse: Mary Ellen Kelly (m. 1875)
- Children: 9
- Education: George Washington University

Thaddeus Stevens Sharretts (November 11, 1850 – February 26, 1926) was a Member of the Board of General Appraisers.

== Education and career ==
Sharretts was born on November 11, 1850, in Montgomery County, Maryland. He graduated from Columbian University (now George Washington University) in 1874. He was a grocer in Baltimore, Maryland. He married Mary Ellen Kelly on July 1, 1875, and they had nine children.

He served as an Appraiser for the Port of Baltimore with the United States Department of the Treasury from 1886 to 1890. He served as United States High Commissioner to China from 1901 to 1902.

== Federal Judicial Service ==
Sharretts was nominated by President Benjamin Harrison on July 30, 1890, to the Board of General Appraisers, to a new seat created by 26 Stat. 131. He was confirmed by the United States Senate on July 30, 1890, and received his commission the same day. His service terminated on March 3, 1913, due to his removal from office by President William Howard Taft. He was succeeded by Jerry Bartholomew Sullivan.

=== Circumstances of his removal from office ===
Sharretts' removal from office followed an investigation by a commission appointed for the purpose and consisting of Assistant Attorney General Winfred T. Dennison, Collector of the Port of New York William Loeb and law officer of the Bureau of Insular Affairs Felix Frankfurter future Supreme Court Justice. Sharretts had been accused of seeking preferential treatment from the Baltimore & Ohio Railroad in return for steering freight shipments to the railroad. The commission determined on February 13, 1913, that while Sharretts did not commit an illegal act, his behavior undermined the high judicial standards expected of his office. On March 3, 1913, President Taft upheld the commission's decision and removed Sharretts from office.

== Death ==
Sharretts died on February 26, 1926, in Baltimore.

== Sources ==
- "Board of General Appraisers: Sharretts, Thaddeus Stevens - Federal Judicial Center". www.fjc.gov.

Legal offices
Preceded by Seat established by 26 Stat. 131	Member of the Board of General Appraisers; 1890–1913	Succeeded by Jerry Bartholomew Sullivan
