= Walter Howard Evans =

American judge (1870–1959)

Judge of the United States Customs Court
- In office February 23, 1931 – May 31, 1941
- Appointed by: Herbert Hoover
- Preceded by: Byron Sylvester Waite
- Succeeded by: William A. Ekwall

Personal details
- Born: Walter Howard Evans; April 17, 1870 New Middletown, Indiana, U.S.
- Died: July 13, 1959 (aged 89) Portland, Oregon, U.S.
- Education: Valparaiso University (B.S.); University of Oregon School of Law (LL.B.)

Walter Howard Evans (April 17, 1870 – July 13, 1959) was a judge of the United States Customs Court.

== Education and career ==
Born on April 17, 1870, in New Middletown, Indiana, Evans graduated from North Indiana Normal School in Valparaiso, Indiana, at age 16, in 1886. He then taught school in southern Indiana and Tennessee for 12 years. He returned to Valparaiso for one year of law school in 1897, where he was one of the secretaries of the Indiana Senate. He then received a Bachelor of Science degree in 1899 from Valparaiso University. He received a Bachelor of Laws in 1905 from the University of Oregon School of Law, then located in Portland, Oregon.

Evans enlisted in the Army Quartermaster Corps and was sent to Puerto Rico, where he was a clerk for the United States Army Quartermaster Department Puerto Rico from 1898 to 1903. He mustered out of the Army in 1903, and graduated from the University of Oregon Law School (then located in Portland) in 1905. He was an Assistant United States Attorney for the District of Oregon from 1908 to 1912. Appointed to be Multnomah County District Attorney as part of the governor's vice clean-up campaign, he then was elected to that office twice. He was a state district attorney in the Fourth Judicial District of Oregon from 1912 to 1921.

He served as a Circuit Court Judge for the Fourth Judicial District of Oregon from 1921 to 1931. He was then appointed to U.S. Customs Court.

== Federal Judicial Service ==
Evans was nominated by President Herbert Hoover on January 28, 1931, to a seat on the United States Customs Court vacated by Judge Byron Sylvester Waite. He was confirmed by the United States Senate on February 14, 1931, and received his commission on February 23, 1931. His service terminated on May 31, 1941, due to his retirement. He was succeeded by Judge William A. Ekwall.

== Personal life ==
Evans married May Ball, the daughter of a prominent local banker, Erasmus Ball, in Valparaiso on August 11, 1898. They had three children, Mary (born 1900 in Puerto Rico), Alice (born 1901 in Puerto Rico), and Walter Howard Evans Jr. (born March 12, 1911, in Portland). Evans died on July 13, 1959, in Portland.

Legal offices
Preceded by Byron Sylvester Waite	Judge of the United States Customs Court; 1931–1941	Succeeded by William A. Ekwall
