= Herbert N. Maletz =

American judge

Senior Judge of the United States Court of International Trade
- In office December 31, 1982 – January 6, 2002

Judge of the United States Court of International Trade
- In office November 1, 1980 – December 31, 1982
- Appointed by: operation of law
- Preceded by: Seat established by 94 Stat. 1727
- Succeeded by: Jane A. Restani

Judge of the United States Customs Court
- In office November 16, 1967 – November 1, 1980
- Appointed by: Lyndon B. Johnson
- Preceded by: Philip Nichols Jr.
- Succeeded by: Seat abolished

Personal details
- Born: Herbert Naamen Maletz; October 30, 1913 Boston, Massachusetts, U.S.
- Died: January 6, 2002 (aged 88) Towson, Maryland, U.S.
- Education: Harvard University (AB); Harvard Law School (LLB)

Herbert Naamen Maletz (October 30, 1913 – January 6, 2002) was a judge of the United States Court of International Trade.

== Education and career ==
Maletz was born October 30, 1913, in Boston, Massachusetts. He received his Artium Baccalaureus degree from Harvard University in 1935. He received his Bachelor of Laws from Harvard Law School in 1939. Maletz began his career as a review attorney for the Marketing Laws Survey for the Works Progress Administration from 1939 to 1941. He served as an attorney for the United States Senate Special Committee to Investigate the National Defense Program from 1941 to 1942. He served as a technical sergeant in the United States Army from 1942 to 1946. He later served as a lieutenant colonel in the United States Army Reserve. He served as a trial attorney for the Antitrust Division of the United States Department of Justice from 1946 to 1951. He served as chief counsel in the Office of Price Stabilization from 1951 to 1953. He worked as an attorney in private practice from 1953 to 1955 in Washington, D.C. He served as chief counsel for the United States House of Representatives Antitrust Subcommittee from 1955 to 1961. He served as a commissioner of the United States Court of Claims from 1961 to 1967.

== Federal judicial service ==
Maletz was nominated by President Lyndon B. Johnson on November 6, 1967, to a seat on the United States Customs Court vacated by Judge Philip Nichols Jr. He was confirmed by the United States Senate on November 16, 1967, and received his commission the same day. He was reassigned by operation of law to the United States Court of International Trade on November 1, 1980, to a new seat authorized by 94 Stat. 1727. He assumed senior status on December 31, 1982. His service terminated on January 6, 2002, due to his death in Towson, Maryland.

== Sources ==
Legal offices
| Preceded by Philip Nichols Jr. | Judge of the United States Customs Court; 1967–1980 | Succeeded by Seat abolished |
| Preceded by Seat established by 94 Stat. 1727 | Judge of the United States Court of International Trade; 1980–1982 | Succeeded by Jane A. Restani |
