= Scovel Richardson =

United States judge

Judge of the United States Court of International Trade
- In office November 1, 1980 – March 30, 1982
- Appointed by: operation of law
- Preceded by: Seat established by 94 Stat. 1727
- Succeeded by: Gregory W. Carman

Judge of the United States Customs Court
- In office April 8, 1957 – November 1, 1980
- Appointed by: Dwight D. Eisenhower
- Preceded by: William A. Ekwall
- Succeeded by: Seat abolished

Personal details
- Born: Scovel Richardson; February 4, 1912 Nashville, Tennessee, U.S.
- Died: March 30, 1982 (aged 70) New Rochelle, New York, U.S.
- Education: University of Illinois at Urbana– Champaign (AB, AM); Howard University School of Law (JD)

Scovel Richardson (February 4, 1912 – March 30, 1982) was a judge of the United States Customs Court and the United States Court of International Trade. Richardson was one of the first Black Federal judges in the United States.

== Education and career ==
Born on February 4, 1912, in Nashville, Tennessee, Richardson received an Artium Baccalaureus degree in 1934 from the University of Illinois at Urbana–Champaign and an Artium Magister degree in 1936 from the same institution. He received a Juris Doctor in 1937 from the Howard University School of Law. Richardson entered private practice in Chicago, Illinois, from 1938 to 1939. He was an associate professor of law at Lincoln University School of Law from 1939 to 1943. He served as a senior attorney at the Office of Price Administration from 1943 to 1944. He served as dean and professor of law at Lincoln University School of Law from 1944 to 1953. He served as a member of the United States Board of Parole from 1953 to 1957 and served as chair of the United States Board of Parole from 1954 to 1957.

== Federal judicial service ==
Richardson was nominated by President Dwight D. Eisenhower on March 4, 1957, to a seat on the United States Customs Court vacated by Judge William A. Ekwall. He was confirmed by the United States Senate on April 4, 1957, and received his commission on April 8, 1957. Richardson was reassigned by operation of law to the United States Court of International Trade on November 1, 1980, to a new seat authorized by 94 Stat. 1727. His service terminated on March 30, 1982, due to his death in New Rochelle, New York. He was succeeded by Judge Gregory W. Carman.

== Personal life ==
In 1942 in St. Louis, Richardson's purchase of a home led to a legal case over a restrictive covenant.

== See also ==
- List of African-American federal judges
- List of African-American jurists

== Sources ==
Legal offices
Preceded by William A. Ekwall	Judge of the United States Customs Court; 1957–1980	Succeeded by Seat abolished
Preceded by Seat established by 94 Stat. 1727	Judge of the United States Court of International Trade; 1980–1982	Succeeded by Gregory W. Carman
