= David T. and Nan Wood Honeyman House =

Historic building in Portland, Oregon, U.S.

- U.S. National Register of Historic Places
- Portland Historic Landmark
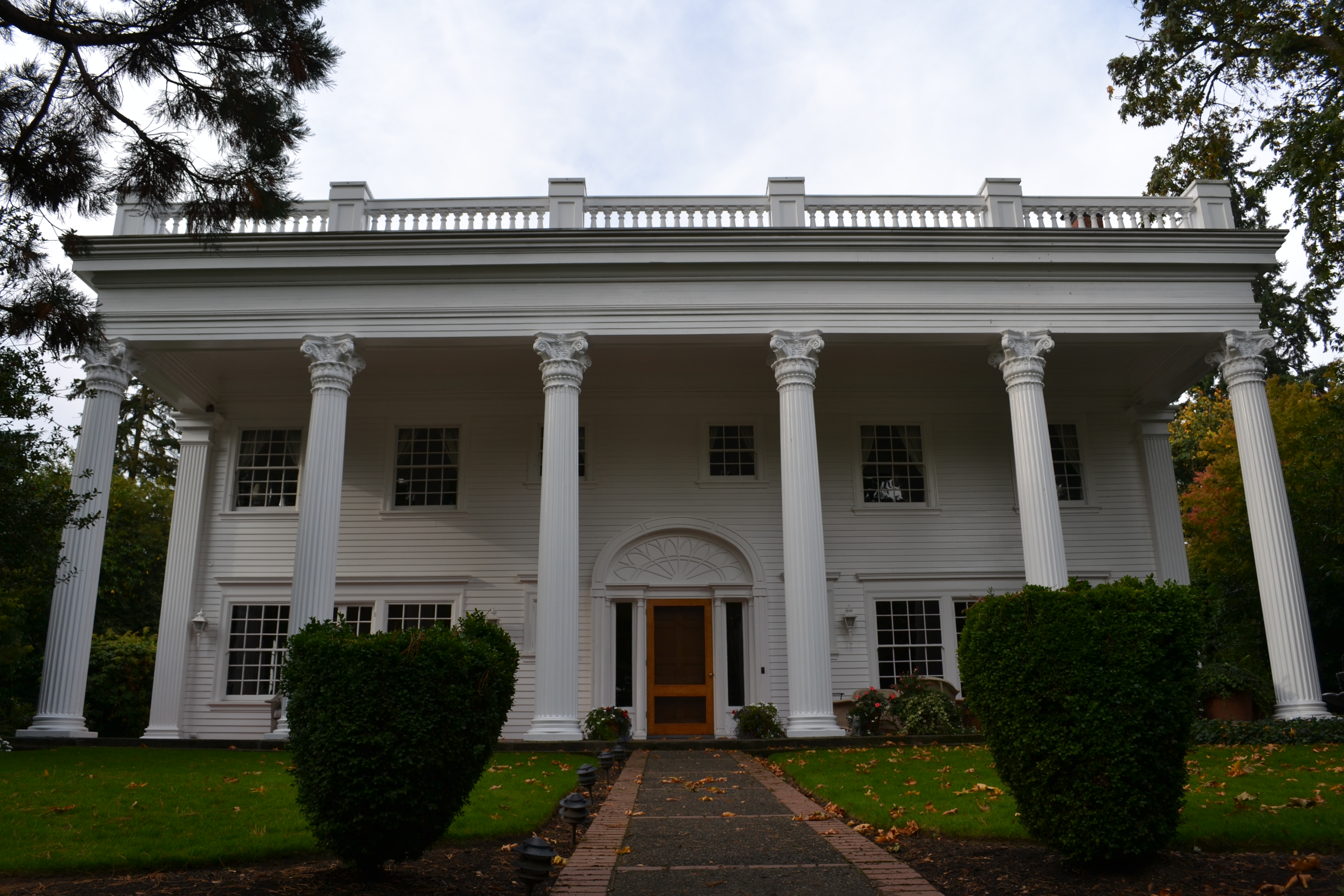
- David T. and Nan Wood Honeyman House in 2011

- Location within Portland, Oregon
- Location: 1728 SW Prospect Drive; Portland, Oregon
- Coordinates: 45°31′02″N 122°41′52″W
- Area: 0.4 acres (0.16 ha)
- Built: 1908
- Architect: David Chambers Lewis
- Architectural style: Colonial Revival
- NRHP reference No.: 87000677
- Added to NRHP: May 7, 1987

The David T. and Nan Wood Honeyman House is a house located in southwest Portland, Oregon, listed on the National Register of Historic Places.

== See also ==
- Nan Wood Honeyman
- National Register of Historic Places listings in Southwest Portland, Oregon
