= Nan Wood Honeyman =

American politician (1881–1970)

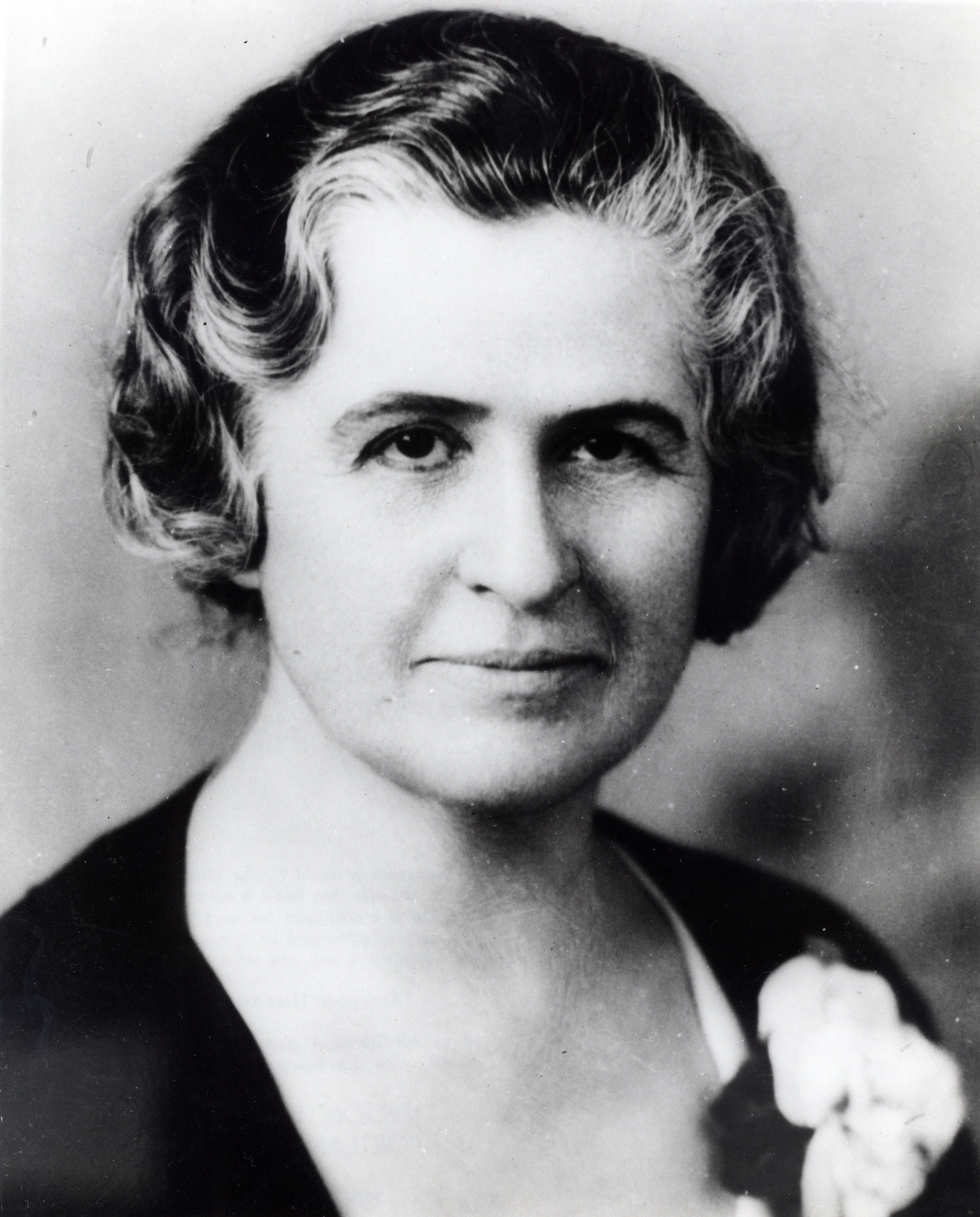

Member of the U.S. House of Representatives from Oregon's 3rd district
- In office January 3, 1937 – January 3, 1939
- Preceded by: William A. Ekwall
- Succeeded by: Homer D. Angell

Member of the Oregon Senate
- In office 1941–1942

Personal details
- Born: Nan Wood; July 15, 1881 West Point, New York, U.S.
- Died: December 10, 1970 (aged 89) Woodacre, California, U.S.
- Resting place: River View Cemetery
- Party: Democratic
- Spouse: David Honeyman

Nan Honeyman (née Wood; July 15, 1881 – December 10, 1970) was an American politician from the state of Oregon. A native of New York, she was the daughter of author and attorney Charles Erskine Scott Wood. After growing up in Oregon, she served in the Oregon House of Representatives and the Oregon State Senate. Between these offices, Honeyman became the first woman elected to the United States Congress from Oregon in 1936.

== Early years ==
She was born Nan Wood in West Point, New York, in 1881 to the noted libertarian author Charles Erskine Scott Wood (died 1944) and Nanny Moale Wood (died 1933). She moved with her parents three years later to Portland, Oregon, where she graduated from St. Helens Hall (later incorporated in the Oregon Episcopal School) in 1898. Nan was one of five children: her siblings were Berwick Bruce, Elisa, Erskine, and William Maxwell. Her education continued later at the Finch School in New York City, where she began a lifelong friendship with Eleanor Roosevelt.

== Political life ==
She married David Honeyman in 1907, with whom she raised three children and was active in civic and humanitarian organizations before becoming involved in politics. Honeyman served as a delegate to the state constitutional convention in 1933, which ratified the Twenty-first Amendment to the United States Constitution, repealing prohibition. She was a member of the Oregon House of Representatives from 1935 to 1937 and served as a delegate to the Democratic national conventions in 1936 and 1940.

=== Congress ===
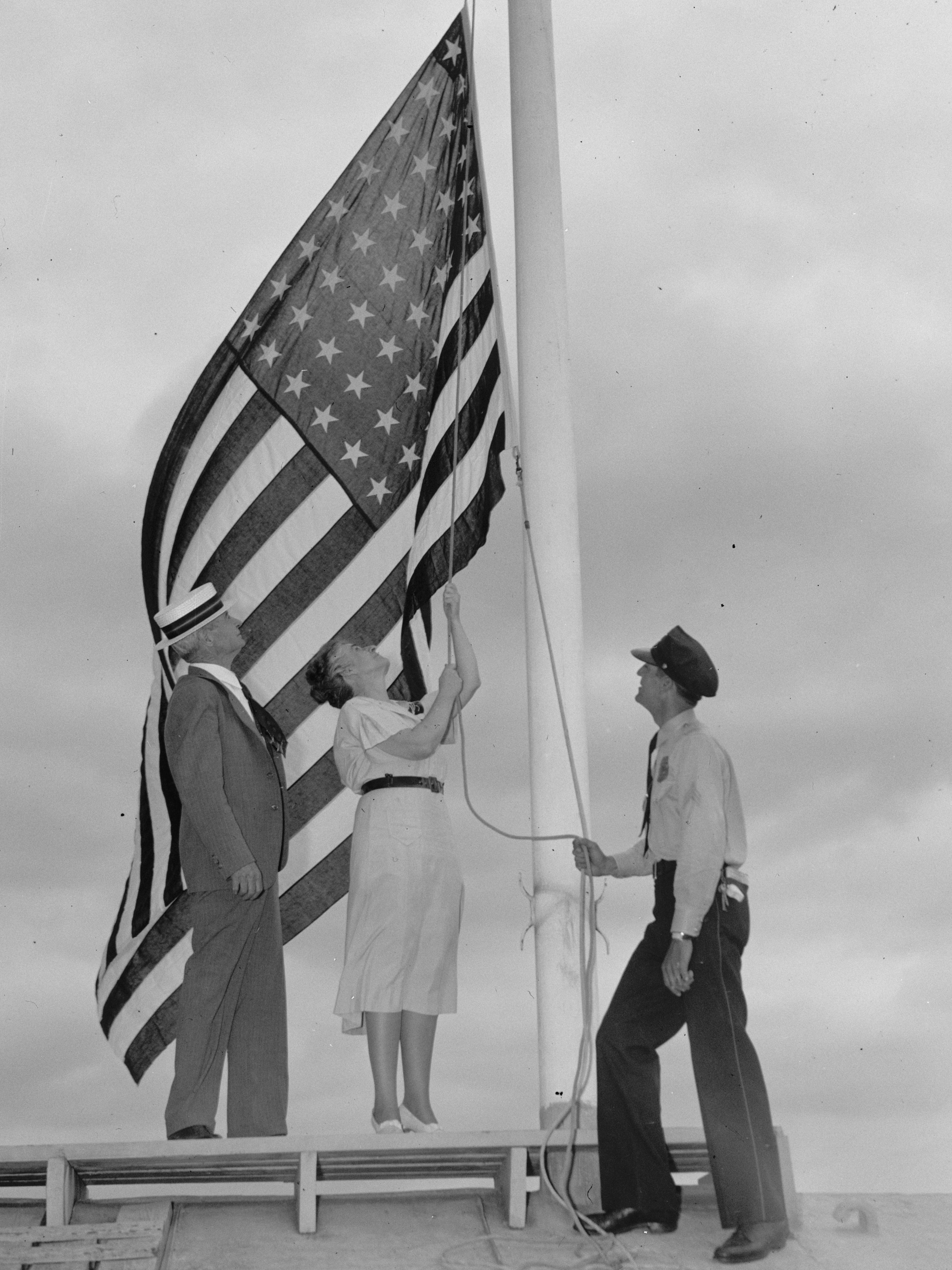
United States Representative Nan Honeyman lowers flag at US Capitol in 1938

Honeyman was elected as a Democrat to the United States House of Representatives, representing Oregon's 3rd congressional district and served from 1937 to 1939, the first congresswoman from Oregon. While in Congress, Honeyman was a strong supporter of the New Deal and the completion of the Bonneville Dam. However, her bids for reelection in 1938 and election in 1940 were unsuccessful.

=== Federal roles ===
She held the position of senior representative of the Pacific Coast Office of Price Administration from 1941 to 1942. During the same period, the Multnomah County Commissioners appointed Honeyman to the Oregon Senate in 1941 to fill a vacancy, and she served until her resignation in 1942. She was U.S. Collector of Customs in Portland, Oregon from 1942 to 1953.

=== Lawsuit ===
In 1942, her father and several other relatives sued Honeyman and her husband over her husband's mismanagement of several family trusts. The court determined David Honeyman had misappropriated in excess of $100,000 of trust funds while Nan was left blameless. In 1946, the case was finally resolved after the Oregon Supreme Court affirmed the lower court's ruling, which came after Honeyman's father died in 1944.

== Death and burial ==
Honeyman died in Woodacre, California, on December 10, 1970, and was buried at River View Cemetery in Portland.

== See also ==
- David T. and Nan Wood Honeyman House
- Women in the United States House of Representatives

U.S. House of Representatives
Preceded by William A. Ekwall	Member of the U.S. House of Representatives from Oregon's 3rd congressional district 1937–1939	Succeeded by Homer D. Angell
