= Jerome Ambro =

American politician

Jerome Anthony Ambro, Jr.
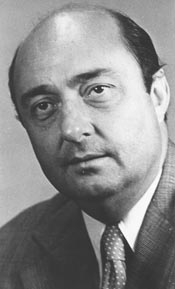

Member of the U.S. House of Representatives from New York's 3rd district
- In office January 3, 1975 – January 3, 1981
- Preceded by: Angelo D. Roncallo
- Succeeded by: Gregory W. Carman

Personal details
- Born: June 27, 1928 Brooklyn, New York, US
- Died: March 4, 1993 (aged 64) Alexandria, Virginia, US
- Party: Democratic Party
- Spouses: Helen McCooey Ambro; Antoinette Salatto Ambro
- Children: 3
- Education: New York University
- Occupation: Politician; Environmentalist

Military service
- Allegiance: United States
- Branch/service: United States Army
- Years of service: 1951 to 1953
- Rank: Sergeant
- Unit: Military Police
- Battles/wars: Korean War

Jerome Anthony Ambro, Jr. (June 27, 1928 – March 4, 1993) was an American military veteran and politician who served three terms as a member of the United States House of Representatives for New York from 1975 to 1981.

== Biography ==
Ambro's father was New York assemblyman Jerome G. Ambro. Born in Brooklyn, New York, he attended Brooklyn public elementary schools and graduated from Grover Cleveland High School, Queens, New York, in 1946. Ambro earned a B.A. from New York University in 1955. He was married on June 11, 1955, to Helen McCooey, with whom he had three children, Cathleen Ambro DeRolf, David Ambro and Richard Ambro. His second wife was Antoinette Salatto.

== Career ==
=== Military service ===
During the Korean War, Ambro served in the United States Army as a member of the Military Police from 1951 to 1953 where he attained the rank of sergeant.

=== Early political career ===
Ambro served the town of Huntington as a budget office and purchasing and personnel director from 1960 to 1967. Later, he served on the Suffolk County, New York Board of Supervisors from 1968 to 1969. From 1968 to 1974 he served four terms as Supervisor for the town of Huntington. He was simultaneously chairman of Huntington's Urban Renewal Agency, as well as president of Freeholders and Commonalty of the Town of Huntington.

In 1970, Ambro challenged Basil Paterson for the Democratic nomination for Lieutenant Governor of New York, but was defeated in the primary election.

=== Congress ===
Elected as a Democrat to the 94th, 95th and 96th United States Congresses, Ambro served from January 3, 1975, to January 3, 1981. He led the Democratic Party to its first sweep of Huntington elections in 35 years. While Ambro was in office, the town of Huntington became the first municipality to ban the use of the pesticide DDT.

During his first term in the House, Ambro was elected president of his 82-member freshman class. Ambro served on the Public Works and Transportation Committee and was elected chairman of the House Science and Technology Committee Subcommittee on Natural Resources and the Environment. Ambro played a major role in winning the preservation of wetlands in Massapequa, New York, and having Brookhaven National Laboratory designated as the site of a high-energy reactor.

In 1980, Ambro authored an amendment to the Marine Protection, Research, and Sanctuaries Act (Section 106(f)) to require that the disposal of dredged material into Long Island Sound from any federal project, or from any non-federal project exceeding 25,000 cubic yards (19,000 m³), comply with the environmental criteria for ocean dumping under the MPRSA, in addition to the requirements of Section 404 of the Clean Water Act.

He was defeated for re-election in 1980 by Gregory W. Carman

After leaving Congress, he worked as a lobbyist and was a governmental and legislative consultant.

== Death and legacy ==
Ambro died from diabetes in a hospital at Falls Church, Virginia, on March 4, 1993 (age 64 years, 250 days). He is interred at Arlington National Cemetery, Arlington, Virginia.

The East Northport, New York, post office building was renamed the Jerome Anthony Ambro, Jr. Post Office Building in 1998. The Town of Huntington named the Jerome Ambro Memorial Wetlands Preserve in honor of Ambro's conservation efforts.

U.S. House of Representatives
Preceded by Angelo D. Roncallo	Member of the U.S. House of Representatives from New York's 3rd congressional district 1975–1981	Succeeded by Gregory W. Carman
