= Angelo D. Roncallo =

American politician

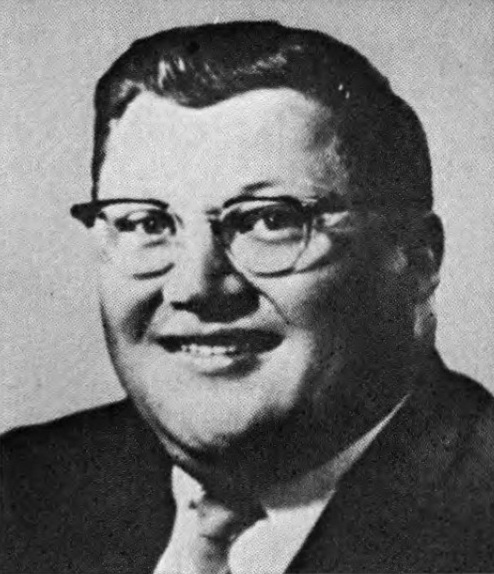

Member of the U.S. House of Representatives from New York's 3rd district
- In office January 3, 1973 – January 3, 1975
- Preceded by: Lester L. Wolff
- Succeeded by: Jerome A. Ambro, Jr.

Comptroller of Nassau County
- In office January 1, 1968 – January 3, 1973
- Preceded by: Peter P. Rocchio Sr.
- Succeeded by: M. Hallstead Christ

Personal details
- Born: Angelo Dominick Roncallo; May 8, 1927 Port Chester, New York, U.S.
- Died: May 4, 2010 (aged 82)
- Party: Republican
- Education: Manhattan College (BA); Georgetown University (JD)

Angelo Dominick Roncallo (May 28, 1927 – May 4, 2010) was an American lawyer, jurist, and politician who served one term as a Republican member of the United States House of Representatives from Nassau County, New York from 1973 to 1975. He was a justice on the New York Supreme Court from 1977 to 1995.

== Biography ==
Roncallo was born in Port Chester, New York. He served in the United States Army from 1944 until 1945. He graduated from Manhattan College in 1950 and received a law degree from Georgetown University in 1953.

=== Early career ===
He served as a town councilman for the town of Oyster Bay, New York, from 1965 until 1967 and as comptroller of Nassau County, New York, from 1968 until 1972.

He was a delegate to the 1972 Republican National Convention.

=== Congress ===
He was elected to Congress in 1972 and served from January 3, 1973, until January 3, 1975. He unsuccessfully ran for re-election against Jerome A. Ambro, Jr.

=== New York Supreme Court ===
He served as a justice of the New York Supreme Court from 1977 until 1995.

=== Retirement and death ===
He was a resident of Massapequa, New York, for many years.

He died on May 4, 2010.

== Sources ==
- United States Congress. "Angelo D. Roncallo (id: R000422)". Biographical Directory of the United States Congress.

U.S. House of Representatives
Preceded by Lester L. Wolff	Member of the U.S. House of Representatives from New York's 3rd congressional district 1973–1975	Succeeded by Jerome A. Ambro, Jr.
