= Jennifer Choe-Groves =

American judge (born 1969)

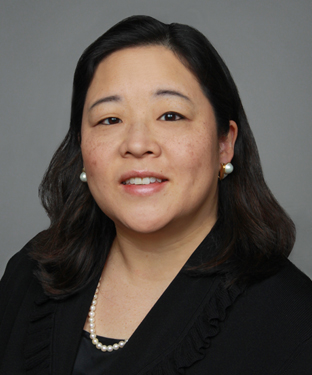

Judge of the United States Court of International Trade
- Incumbent
- Assumed office June 8, 2016
- Appointed by: Barack Obama
- Preceded by: Gregory W. Carman

Personal details
- Born: Jennifer Domee Choe; 1969 (age 56–57) Chicago, Illinois, U.S.
- Party: Republican
- Education: Princeton University (AB); Rutgers University–Newark (JD); Columbia University (LLM)

Jennifer Choe-Groves (née Jennifer Domee Choe; born 1969) is an American lawyer and jurist who serves as a United States judge of the United States Court of International Trade.

== Early life and education ==
Born in Chicago, Illinois, Choe-Groves grew up in New Jersey, the daughter of a father who was a retired chemist and a mother who was a business owner. During her teens, she was considered among the best young concert pianists in the New York area. A graduate of Newark Academy in the class of 1987, she was honored by the school as a distinguished alumnus in 2012. Choe-Groves received an Artium Baccalaureus degree in 1991 from Princeton University. She received a Juris Doctor in 1994 from Rutgers Law School. She received a Master of Laws in 1998 from Columbia Law School. She received a degree in Piano and Composition in 1987 from The Juilliard School, Pre-College Division.

== Career ==
Choe-Groves began her legal career as an Assistant District Attorney in New York County District Attorney's Office from 1994 to 1997. She was an associate at Fish & Neave LLP (now Ropes & Gray LLP) and served as counsel at O'Melveny & Myers LLP. From 2005 to 2010, she served as the Senior Director of Intellectual Property and Innovation in the Office of the United States Trade Representative (USTR) in the Executive Office of the President of the United States. During her time at USTR, she also served as chair of the Special 301 Committee, where she led the inter-agency committee’s decision-making on international trade policy and intellectual property protection. She was a partner at Hughes Hubbard & Reed and at Eckert, Seamans, Cherin & Mellott, LLC. She was the Chief Executive Officer of Titanium Law Group PLLC and Choe Groves Consulting LLC, where she provided legal and consulting services in the areas of international trade and intellectual property.

=== Trade Court service ===
On July 30, 2015, President Barack Obama nominated Choe-Groves to serve as a United States Judge of the United States Court of International Trade, to the seat vacated by Judge Gregory W. Carman, who took senior status on September 15, 2014. She received a hearing on her nomination on January 27, 2016. On April 7, 2016, her nomination was reported out of committee by voice vote. On June 6, 2016, the U.S. Senate confirmed Choe-Groves in a voice vote. She received her commission on June 8, 2016. She was sworn in on June 9, 2016.

== See also ==
- List of Asian American jurists

== Sources ==
- Judge Jennifer Choe-Groves Biography on U.S. Court of International Trade website

Legal offices
Preceded by Gregory W. Carman	Judge of the United States Court of International Trade; 2016–present	Incumbent
