= Jerry Bartholomew Sullivan =

American judge

Judge of the United States Customs Court
- In office May 28, 1926 – September 30, 1939
- Appointed by: operation of law
- Preceded by: Seat established by 44 Stat. 669
- Succeeded by: Thomas Joseph Walker

President of the Board of General Appraisers
- In office 1914–1925
- Preceded by: Henderson M. Somerville
- Succeeded by: William Barberie Howell

Member of the Board of General Appraisers
- In office April 29, 1913 – May 28, 1926
- Appointed by: Woodrow Wilson
- Preceded by: Thaddeus S. Sharretts
- Succeeded by: Seat abolished

Personal details
- Born: Jerry Bartholomew Sullivan; January 1, 1859 Mount Pleasant, Iowa, U.S.
- Died: April 17, 1948 (aged 89)
- Education: read law

Jerry Bartholomew Sullivan (January 1, 1859 – April 17, 1948) was a judge of the United States Customs Court and a member of the Board of General Appraisers.

== Education and career ==
Born on January 1, 1859, in Mount Pleasant, Iowa, Sullivan read law and entered private practice in Creston, Iowa from 1882 to 1904. He was city attorney for Creston from 1887 to 1889. He continued private practice in Des Moines, Iowa from 1904 to 1913.

== Federal Judicial Service ==
Sullivan was nominated by President Woodrow Wilson on April 17, 1913, to a seat on the Board of General Appraisers vacated by Thaddeus S. Sharretts. He was confirmed by the United States Senate on April 28, 1913, and received his commission on April 29, 1913. He served as president from 1914 to 1925. Sullivan was reassigned by operation of law to the United States Customs Court on May 28, 1926, to a new Associate Justice seat (Judge seat from June 17, 1930) authorized by 44 Stat. 669. His service terminated on September 30, 1939, due to his retirement. He was succeeded by Judge Thomas Joseph Walker.

== Death ==
Sullivan died on April 17, 1948.

== Sources ==
Legal offices
Preceded by Thaddeus S. Sharretts	Member of the Board of General Appraisers; 1913–1926	Succeeded by Seat abolished
Preceded by Henderson M. Somerville	President of the Board of General Appraisers; 1914–1925	Succeeded by William Barberie Howell
Preceded by Seat established by 44 Stat. 669	Judge of the United States Customs Court; 1926–1939	Succeeded by Thomas Joseph Walker
