= Gregory W. Carman =

American judge and politician (1937–2020)

Gregory Wright Carman
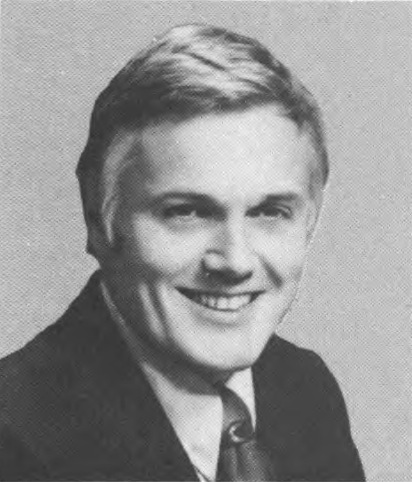

Senior Judge of the United States Court of International Trade
- In office September 15, 2014 – April 5, 2020

Chief Judge of the United States Court of International Trade
- In office October 31, 1996 – November 1, 2003
- Preceded by: Dominick L. DiCarlo
- Succeeded by: Jane A. Restani

Judge of the United States Court of International Trade
- In office March 2, 1983 – September 15, 2014
- Appointed by: Ronald Reagan
- Preceded by: Scovel Richardson
- Succeeded by: Jennifer Choe-Groves

Member of the U.S. House of Representatives from New York's 3rd district
- In office January 3, 1981 – January 3, 1983
- Preceded by: Jerome Ambro
- Succeeded by: Robert J. Mrazek

Member of the Oyster Bay Town Board
- In office 1972–1981

Personal details
- Born: Gregory Wright Carman; January 31, 1937 Farmingdale, New York, U.S.
- Died: April 5, 2020 (aged 83) Melville, New York, U.S.
- Resting place: Powell Cemetery, Farmingdale, New York
- Party: Republican
- Education: St. Lawrence University (BA); St. John's University School of Law (JD)
- Occupation: Attorney

Military service
- Branch/service: United States Army
- Years of service: 1958–1964
- Rank: Captain
- Unit: J.A.G. Corps

Gregory Wright Carman (January 31, 1937 – April 5, 2020) was a senior United States judge of the United States Court of International Trade and was also a Republican member of the United States House of Representatives from New York.

== Biography ==
Carman was born on January 31, 1937, in Farmingdale, New York. He received a Bachelor of Arts degree from St. Lawrence University in 1958 and he received a Juris Doctor from the St. John's University School of Law in 1962. Carman attended The JAG School at the University of Virginia and entered U.S. Army JAG Corps. He served in the Army JAG Corps from 1958 until 1964. He worked in private practice in Farmingdale, New York, from 1961 to 1983. He was a member of the Town Board of Oyster Bay, New York from 1972 until 1981.

== Congressional service ==
Carman was elected to the 97th United States Congress in 1980, defeating incumbent Democrat Jerome Ambro, and represented New York's 3rd congressional district from January 3, 1981, until January 3, 1983. He was not a candidate for re-election to the 98th United States Congress

== Trade Court service ==
On January 31, 1983, President Reagan nominated Carman to serve as a Judge of the United States Court of International Trade, to the seat vacated by Judge Scovel Richardson. His nomination was confirmed by the Senate on March 2, 1983, and he received his commission the same day. He served as Chief Judge from 1996 until 2003. He assumed senior status on September 15, 2014.

== Death ==
Carman died in Melville, New York on April 5, 2020.

U.S. House of Representatives
Preceded by Jerome Ambro	Member of the U.S. House of Representatives from New York's 3rd congressional district 1981–1983	Succeeded by Robert J. Mrazek
Legal offices
Preceded by Scovel Richardson	Judge of the United States Court of International Trade; 1983–2014	Succeeded by Jennifer Choe-Groves
Preceded by Dominick L. DiCarlo	Chief Judge of the United States Court of International Trade; 1996–2003	Succeeded by Jane A. Restani
