= Philip Nichols Jr. =

American judge

Senior Judge of the United States Court of Appeals for the Federal Circuit
- In office October 1, 1983 – January 26, 1990

Judge of the United States Court of Appeals for the Federal Circuit
- In office October 1, 1982 – October 1, 1983
- Appointed by: operation of law
- Preceded by: Seat established by 96 Stat. 25
- Succeeded by: Pauline Newman

Judge of the United States Court of Claims
- In office November 3, 1966 – October 1, 1982
- Appointed by: Lyndon B. Johnson
- Preceded by: Seat established by 80 Stat. 139
- Succeeded by: Seat abolished

Judge of the United States Customs Court
- In office September 15, 1964 – November 30, 1966
- Appointed by: Lyndon B. Johnson
- Preceded by: Irvin Charles Mollison
- Succeeded by: Herbert N. Maletz

Personal details
- Born: Philip Nichols Jr. August 11, 1907 Boston, Massachusetts, U.S.
- Died: January 26, 1990 (aged 82) Washington, D.C., U.S.
- Education: Harvard University (AB, JD)

Philip Nichols Jr. (August 11, 1907 – January 26, 1990) was a United States circuit judge of the United States Court of Appeals for the Federal Circuit and previously was a judge of the United States Customs Court and the United States Court of Claims.

== Education and career ==
Born August 11, 1907, in Boston, Massachusetts, Nichols received an Artium Baccalaureus degree in 1929 from Harvard University and a Juris Doctor in 1932 from Harvard Law School. He entered private practice in Boston from 1932 to 1938. He was a special attorney for the Lands Division of the United States Department of Justice from 1938 to 1941. He was a special attorney for the Legal Division of the War Production Board from 1942 to 1944. He was a United States Navy lieutenant commander from 1944 to 1946. He was assistant general counsel for the United States Department of the Treasury from 1947 to 1951. He was general counsel for the Renegotiation Board from 1951 to 1954. He returned to private practice in Washington, D.C. from 1954 to 1961. He was Commissioner of Customs for the United States Department of the Treasury from 1961 to 1964.

== Federal judicial service ==
Nichols was nominated by President Lyndon B. Johnson on June 16, 1964, to a seat on the United States Customs Court vacated by Judge Irvin C. Mollison. He was confirmed by the United States Senate on September 15, 1964, and received his commission on September 15, 1964. His service terminated on November 30, 1966, due to his elevation to the Court of Claims.

Nichols was nominated by President Johnson on October 6, 1966, to the United States Court of Claims, to a new seat authorized by 80 Stat. 139. He was confirmed by the Senate on October 21, 1966, and received his commission on November 3, 1966. He was reassigned by operation of law to the United States Court of Appeals for the Federal Circuit on October 1, 1982, to a new seat authorized by 96 Stat. 25. He assumed senior status on October 1, 1983. His service terminated on Friday, January 26, 1990, due to his death from heart attack at Georgetown University Hospital in Washington, D.C.

== Sources ==
Legal offices
Preceded by Irvin C. Mollison	Judge of the United States Customs Court; 1964–1966	Succeeded by Herbert N. Maletz
Preceded by Seat established by 80 Stat. 139	Judge of the United States Court of Claims; 1966–1982	Succeeded by Seat abolished
Preceded by Seat established by 96 Stat. 25	Judge of the United States Court of Appeals for the Federal Circuit; 1982–1983	Succeeded by Pauline Newman
