= Byron Sylvester Waite =

American politician (1852-1930)

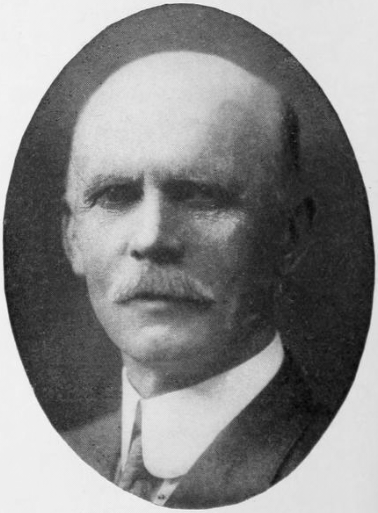

Associate Justice of the United States Customs Court
- In office May 28, 1926 – November 1, 1930
- Appointed by: operation of law
- Preceded by: Seat established by 44 Stat. 669
- Succeeded by: Walter Howard Evans

Member of the Board of General Appraisers
- In office June 25, 1902 – May 28, 1926
- Appointed by: Theodore Roosevelt
- Preceded by: Charles H. Ham
- Succeeded by: Seat abolished

Personal details
- Born: Byron Sylvester Waite; September 27, 1852 Penfield, New York, US
- Died: December 31, 1930 (aged 78) Yonkers, New York, US
- Education: University of Michigan (B.A.) read law

Byron Sylvester Waite (September 27, 1852 – December 31, 1930) was an Associate Justice of the United States Customs Court and previously was a Member of the Board of General Appraisers.

== Education and career ==
Born on September 27, 1852, in Penfield, New York, Waite received a Bachelor of Arts degree in 1880 from the University of Michigan and read law. He entered private practice in Wayne County, Michigan from 1881 to 1889. He served as a member of the Michigan House of Representatives representing Menominee County as a Republican from 1889 to 1890 and again from 1895 to 1896. He served as assistant prosecuting attorney for Wayne County from 1895 to 1898. He served as a Judge for the Third Judicial Circuit of Michigan from 1898 to 1900.

== Federal judicial service ==
Waite was nominated by President Theodore Roosevelt on June 13, 1902, to a seat on the Board of General Appraisers vacated by Member Charles H. Ham. He was confirmed by the United States Senate on June 19, 1902, and received his commission on June 25, 1902. Waite was reassigned by operation of law to the United States Customs Court on May 28, 1926, to a new Associate Justice seat authorized by 44 Stat. 669. His service terminated on November 1, 1930, due to his retirement. He was succeeded by Associate Justice Walter Howard Evans.

=== Incident ===
Two days after his retirement, the New York Supreme Court ruled against his former daughter in law (Olive Celeste Moore-White-Waite-Matthews) and American Express for receiving a shipment of rugs and carpets (August 1919) from the United States Customs House without ever meeting the terms of the bill of lading.

== Death ==
Waite died on December 31, 1930, in Yonkers, New York.

== Sources ==
Legal offices
Preceded by Charles H. Ham	Member of the Board of General Appraisers; 1902–1926	Succeeded by Seat abolished
Preceded by Seat established by 44 Stat. 669	Associate Justice of the United States Customs Court; 1926–1930	Succeeded by Walter Howard Evans
