= Gary Katzmann =

American judge (born 1953)

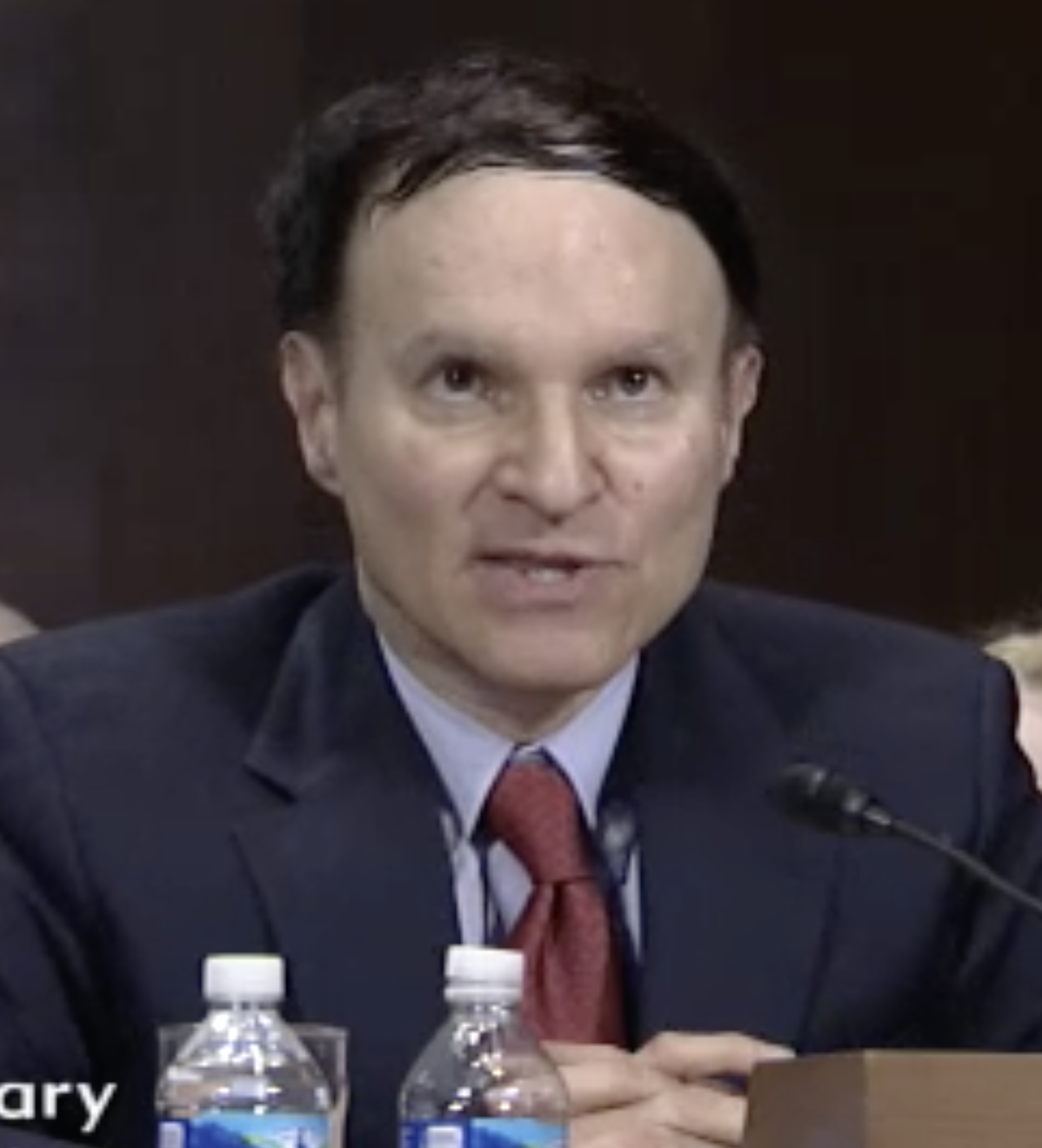

Judge of the United States Court of International Trade
- Incumbent
- Assumed office September 15, 2016
- Appointed by: Barack Obama
- Preceded by: Jane A. Restani

Personal details
- Born: Gary Stephen Katzmann; 1953 (age 71–72) New York City, U.S.
- Relatives: Robert Katzmann (twin)
- Education: Columbia University (BA); University of Oxford (MLitt); Yale University (MPPM, JD)

Gary Stephen Katzmann (born 1953) is an American lawyer who has served as a United States judge of the United States Court of International Trade since 2016. He previously served as an associate justice of the Massachusetts Appeals Court from 2004 to 2016.

== Biography ==
Katzmann received an Artium Baccalaureus degree in 1973 from Columbia College at Columbia University. He received a Master of Letters in 1976 from the University of Oxford. He received a master's in public and private management in 1979 from the Yale School of Organization and Management. He received a Juris Doctor in 1979 from Yale Law School. He began his legal career by serving as a law clerk to Judge Leonard B. Sand of the United States District Court for the Southern District of New York from 1979 to 1980 and to Judge Stephen Breyer of the United States Court of Appeals for the First Circuit from 1980 to 1981. From 1981 to 1983, he worked at Harvard Law School's Center for Criminal Justice as a research associate and special investigator. From 1983 to 2004, he served in the United States Attorney's Office for the District of Massachusetts, including as chief appellate attorney, deputy chief of the criminal division, and chief legal counsel to the United States attorney. While at the United States Attorney's Office, he was detailed to the Federal Bureau of Investigation from 1994 to 1995 and the Office of the Deputy Attorney General from 1993 to 1994. From 2004 to 2016, he served as an associate justice of the Massachusetts Appeals Court adjudicating civil and criminal matters. His twin brother, Robert Katzmann, served as chief judge on the United States Court of Appeals for the Second Circuit.

== Trade Court service ==
On July 30, 2015, President Barack Obama nominated Katzmann to serve as a United States Judge of the United States Court of International Trade, to the seat vacated by Judge Jane A. Restani, who took senior status on March 1, 2015. He received a hearing on his nomination on January 27, 2016. On April 7, 2016, his nomination was reported out of committee by voice vote. On June 6, 2016, the U.S. Senate confirmed Katzmann's nomination in a voice vote. He received his commission on September 15, 2016.

== Sources ==
Legal offices
Preceded by Jane A. Restani	Judge of the United States Court of International Trade; 2016–present	Incumbent
