= Charles H. Ham =

American judge (1831-1902)

President of the Board of General Appraisers
- In office 1897–1902
- Preceded by: George C. Tichenor
- Succeeded by: Israel F. Fischer

Member of the Board of General Appraisers
- In office July 16, 1890 – August 1, 1902
- Appointed by: Benjamin Harrison
- Preceded by: Seat established by 26 Stat. 131
- Succeeded by: Byron Sylvester Waite

Personal details
- Born: Charles H. Ham; January 22, 1831 New Hampshire, U.S.
- Died: October 16, 1902 (aged 71) Montclair, New Jersey, U.S.
- Education: read law

Charles H. Ham (January 22, 1831 – October 16, 1902) was a Member and President of the Board of General Appraisers.

== Education and career ==
Born on January 22, 1831, in New Hampshire, Ham read law and entered private practice in Chicago, Illinois from 1858 to 1866. He served as appraiser of the Port of Chicago from 1871 to 1885. He was an editorial writer for the Chicago Tribune from 1885 to 1890. He served as assistant treasurer of Cook County, Illinois from 1885 to 1890.

== Federal judicial service ==
Ham was nominated by President Benjamin Harrison on July 2, 1890, to the Board of General Appraisers, to a new seat created by 26 Stat. 131. He was confirmed by the United States Senate on July 16, 1890, and received his commission the same day. He served as President from 1897 to 1902. His service terminated on August 1, 1902, due to his resignation. He was succeeded by Byron Sylvester Waite.

== Death ==
Ham died on October 16, 1902, in Montclair, New Jersey.

== Sources ==
- "Board of General Appraisers: Ham, Charles H. - Federal Judicial Center". www.fjc.gov.

Legal offices
Preceded by Seat established by 26 Stat. 131	Member of the Board of General Appraisers; 1890–1902	Succeeded by Byron Sylvester Waite
Preceded by George C. Tichenor	President of the Board of General Appraisers; 1897–1902	Succeeded by Israel F. Fischer
