= Willis E. Mollison =

American lawyer, businessman, banker (1859–1924)

Willis Elbert Mollison
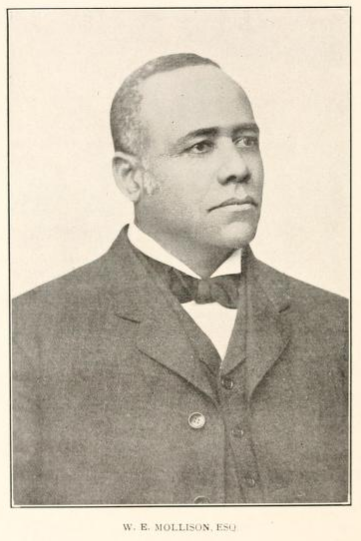
- Willis Elbert Mollison (ca. 1911)
- Born: September 15, 1859; Mayersville, Mississippi, U.S.
- Died: May 11, 1924; U.S.
- Occupation(s): Lawyer, teacher, newspaper publisher, newspaper editor, politician, banker, businessman, public official, civil rights advocate
- Children: Irvin C. Mollison

Willis Elbert Mollison (1859—1924) was an American teacher, newspaper editor, politician, banker, businessman, lawyer, public official, and civil rights advocate in Mississippi. He was a Republican.

== Early life and education ==
Willis Elbert Mollison was born on September 15, 1859 in Mayersville, Mississippi. Martha née Gibson and Robert Mollison were his parents. He studied at Fisk University's college preparatory school, and Oberlin College (class of 1883).

== Career ==
He wrote a book The Leading Afro-Americans of Vicksburg, Miss., Their Enterprises, Churches, Schools, Lodges and Societies (1908), about prominent African Americans in Vicksburg, Mississippi.

Mollison was the president of Lincoln Park Land Company, a stockholder in the Lincoln Savings Bank of Vicksburg. He was also the director of the Mound Bayou Oil Mill and Manufacturing Company in Mound Bayou.

Mollison published The Golden Rule a four-page weekly newspaper in Vicksburg, Mississippi. He was also the owner of the National Star newspaper. He moved to Chicago in 1917.

He died on May 11, 1924.

His son, Irvin C. Mollison also was a lawyer and served as president of the Bar Association of Cook County, Illinois.
