= Irvin C. Mollison =

American judge (1898–1962)

Irvin Charles Mollison

Judge of the United States Customs Court
- In office October 29, 1945 – May 5, 1962
- Appointed by: Harry S. Truman
- Preceded by: Thomas Joseph Walker
- Succeeded by: Philip Nichols Jr.

Personal details
- Born: Irvin Charles Mollison; December 24, 1898 Vicksburg, Mississippi, U.S.
- Died: May 5, 1962 (aged 63) New York City, New York, U.S.
- Parent: Willis E. Mollison
- Education: University of Chicago (PhB, JD)

Irvin Charles Mollison (December 24, 1898 – May 5, 1962) was the first African-American United States federal judge when he was unanimously confirmed by the U.S. Senate in 1945 to serve on the United States Customs Court.

== Education and career ==
Born on December 24, 1898, in Vicksburg, Mississippi, Mollison was the son of Willis E. Mollison, one of the "pioneering African-American lawyers in Mississippi."

Mollison received a Bachelor of Philosophy degree in 1920 from the University of Chicago, graduating Phi Beta Kappa. He received a J.D. degree in 1923 from the University of Chicago Law School. He then worked in private practice in Chicago, Illinois from 1923 to 1945.

Mollison successfully argued before the U. S. Supreme Court in the landmark case of Hansberry v. Lee. Mollison represented Israel Katz, one of the defendants who had signed the restrictive covenant (thinking it was a petition for neighborhood improvement).

Mollison was a leader in a variety of civic and professional organizations in Chicago. He was the President of the Illinois NAACP in the late 1930s. From 1938 to 41 and 1945 to 48, Mollison served on the board of directors for the Chicago Public Library. In 1944, Mollison became the only black director of the Chicago Board of Education. In 1944 and 1945, Mollison was a member of the board of directors for the Chicago Chapter of the National Lawyers Guild.

In addition, Mollison was a member of the Cook County Bar Association, Illinois State Bar Association, and the National Bar Association.

== Federal judicial service ==
Mollison was nominated by President Harry S. Truman on October 3, 1945, to a seat on the United States Customs Court vacated by Judge Thomas Joseph Walker. He was confirmed by the United States Senate on October 26, 1945, without a single dissenting vote. He received his commission on October 29, 1945. Mollison was the first African American to serve on the United States Customs Court and the first African American to serve as a federal judge in the United States. Mollison was initially appointed as a Judge under Article I, but the court was raised to Article III status by operation of law on July 14, 1956, and Mollison thereafter served as an Article III Judge. His service terminated on May 5, 1962, due to his death in New York City.

== See also ==
- List of African-American federal judges
- List of African-American jurists

Legal offices
Preceded by Thomas Joseph Walker	Judge of the United States Customs Court; 1945–1962	Succeeded by Philip Nichols Jr.
