= List of justices of the Indiana Supreme Court =

The following are lists of members of the Indiana Supreme Court. Founded in 1816 with the ratification of the Constitution of Indiana, the court's size has varied between three and five members serving at the same time.

== Appointment of justices ==
From 1816 until 1851 justices served seven-year terms and were appointed by the governor and confirmed by the Indiana Senate. From 1851 until 1971 justices were elected by popular vote every six years. From 1971 to the present a pool of candidates is selected by the Indiana Judicial Nominating Commission and one is appointed by the governor. Justices are subject to a retention election after two years of service and, if retained, they may continue for a full term of ten years.

== Current justices ==
Name	Term start	Term expires	Notes
Loretta Rush	November 7, 2012	2034	
Mark Massa	April 2, 2012	2034	
Geoffrey G. Slaughter	May 9, 2016	2028	
Christopher M. Goff	July 24, 2017	2030	
Derek R. Molter	September 1, 2022	2034	

== Previous Supreme Court justices ==
#	Name	Term start	Term end	Days in office	Undergraduate and masters	LL.B./J.D.	LL.M./S.J.D.	Notes
1	John Johnson	December 28, 1816	September 10, 1817	256				
2	James Scott	December 28, 1816	December 28, 1830	5113		Indiana University (honorary LL.D.)		
3	Jesse Lynch Holman	December 28, 1816	December 28, 1830	5113				
4	Isaac Blackford	September 10, 1817	January 3, 1853	12899	Princeton University			
5	Stephen Stevens	January 28, 1831	May 30, 1836	1949				
6	John T. McKinney	January 28, 1831	March 4, 1837	2313				
7	Charles Dewey	May 30, 1836	January 29, 1847	3896	Williams College	Indiana University (honorary LL.D.)		
8	Jeremiah Sullivan	May 29, 1837	January 21, 1846	3159	College of William & Mary			
9	Samuel E. Perkins	January 21, 1846	January 3, 1865	8002				
9-cont'd	Samuel E. Perkins	January 1, 1877	December 17, 1879	8002				
10	Thomas Smith	January 29, 1847	January 3, 1853	2166				
11	Andrew Davison	January 3, 1853	January 3, 1865	4383	Jefferson College			
12	Addison Roache	January 3, 1853	May 8, 1854	490	Indiana University			
13	William Z. Stuart	January 3, 1853	January 3, 1858	1826	Amherst College			
14	Alvin Hovey	May 8, 1854	January 1, 1855	581				
15	Samuel Gookins	January 1, 1855	December 10, 1857	731				
16	James Hanna	December 10, 1857	January 3, 1865	2581				
17	James Worden	January 16, 1858	January 3, 1865	6895				
17-cont'd	James Worden	January 3, 1871	December 2, 1882	6895				
18	James S. Frazer	January 3, 1865	January 3, 1871	2191				
19	Jehu Elliott	January 3, 1865	January 3, 1871	2191				
20	Charles Ray	January 3, 1865	January 3, 1871	2191				
21	Robert Gregory	January 3, 1865	January 3, 1871	2191				
22	John Pettit	January 3, 1871	January 1, 1877	2192				
23	Alexander Downey	January 3, 1871	January 1, 1877	2190	County Seminary (Wilmington, OH)			
24	Samuel Buskirk	January 3, 1871	January 1, 1877	2190	Indiana University			
25	Andrew L. Osborn	December 16, 1872	January 4, 1875	749				
26	Horace P. Biddle	January 4, 1875	January 3, 1881	2191				
27	William Niblack	January 1, 1877	January 7, 1889	4389	Indiana University			
28	George Howk	January 1, 1877	January 7, 1889	4389	Indiana Asbury University			
29	John T. Scott	December 29, 1879	January 5, 1881	373	Franklin College			
30	Byron Elliott	January 3, 1881	January 2, 1893	4382	Marion County Seminary			
31	William Allen Woods	January 3, 1881	May 8, 1883	855	Wabash College			
32	William H. Coombs	December 2, 1882	January 1, 1883	30				
33	Allen Zollars	January 1, 1883	January 7, 1889	2198	Denison University (B.A./M.A.)	Denison University (LL.D.)/University of Michigan Law School		
34	Edwin Hammond	May 14, 1883	January 6, 1885	603	Indiana Asbury University (LL.B.)			
35	Joseph Mitchell	January 6, 1885	December 12, 1890	2166				
36	Silas Coffey	January 7, 1889	January 7, 1895	2191	Indiana University			
37	Walter Olds	January 7, 1889	June 15, 1893	1620	†Capital University	†Ohio State University		
38	John Berkshire	January 17, 1889	February 19, 1891	763		Indiana Asbury University		
39	Robert McBride	December 17, 1890	January 2, 1893	747				
40	John Miller	February 25, 1891	January 2, 1893	677	Hanover College			
41	Leonard Hackney	January 2, 1893	January 2, 1899	2191				
42	James McCabe	January 2, 1893	January 2, 1899	2191				
43	Timothy Howard	January 2, 1893	January 2, 1899	2191	University of Michigan/University of Notre Dame (A.B./A.M.)	Notre Dame Law School		
44	Joseph S. Dailey	June 25, 1893	January 7, 1895	531		Indiana University Maurer School of Law		
45	James Jordan	January 7, 1895	April 10, 1912	6303	Wabash College/Indiana University	Indiana University Maurer School of Law		
46	Leander Monks	January 7, 1895	January 7, 1913	6575	Indiana University			
47	Alexander Dowling	January 2, 1899	January 2, 1905	2192				
48	John V. Hadley	January 2, 1899	January 2, 1911	4383	Northwestern Christian University of Indianapolis	Indianapolis Law School		
49	Francis E. Baker	January 2, 1899	January 25, 1902	1119	Indiana University/University of Michigan	University of Michigan Law School		
50	John H. Gillett	January 25, 1902	January 4, 1909	2536				
51	Oscar H. Montgomery	January 2, 1905	January 2, 1911	2191	Hanover College (B.A./M.A.)			
52	Quincy Alden Myers	January 4, 1909	January 4, 1915	2191	Northwestern Christian University of Indianapolis/Dartmouth College	Union Law School		
53	John W. Spencer	April 15, 1912	January 7, 1919	2093	Central Normal College			
54	Douglas J. Morris	January 2, 1911	January 1, 1917	2191	Indiana Asbury University			
55	Charles E. Cox	January 2, 1911	January 1, 1917	2191				
56	Richard K. Erwin	January 6, 1913	October 15, 1918	2108	Methodist College			
57	Moses Lairy	January 4, 1915	January 3, 1921	2191	Northern Indiana Normal School	University of Michigan Law School		
58	David Myers	January 1, 1917	December 31, 1934	6573	Smithson College/Central Normal College/Union University	Union Law School		
59	Lawson Harvey	January 1, 1917	June 25, 1920	1271	Butler University/Haverford College	Central Law School		
60	Howard L. Townsend	October 5, 1917	November 1, 1923	2218	Bethany College (West Virginia)	Chicago-Kent College of Law		
61	Benjamin Willoughby	January 6, 1919	January 7, 1931	4384		Cincinnati College		
62	Louis Ewbank	January 1, 1920	January 3, 1927	2559				
63	Julius Travis	January 3, 1921	January 3, 1933	4383	University of Michigan	University of Michigan Law School		
64	Fred Gause	November 1, 1923	January 5, 1925	431		Indiana University Maurer School of Law		
65	Willard Gemmill	January 5, 1925	January 4, 1931	2190	DePauw University	Indiana Law School		
66	Clarence R. Martin	January 3, 1927	January 3, 1933	2192	University of Michigan	Indiana Law School		
67	Curtis Roll	January 5, 1931	January 4, 1943	4382	Indiana University	Indiana University Maurer School of Law		
68	Walter Treanor	January 8, 1931	December 27, 1937	2545	Indiana University	Indiana University Maurer School of Law	Harvard Law School (S.J.D.)	
69	Michael Fansler	January 4, 1933	January 1, 1945	4380	University of Notre Dame	Notre Dame Law School		
70	James P. Hughes	January 3, 1933	January 1, 1939	2189	DePauw University	Indiana University Maurer School of Law		
71	George Tremain	January 1, 1935	December 31, 1940	2191	Central Normal College	Indiana Law School		
72	Curtis Shake	January 4, 1938	January 7, 1946	2925	Vincennes University	Indiana University Maurer School of Law		
73	Hardress Nathan Swaim	January 1, 1939	January 1, 1945	2192	DePauw University	University of Chicago Law School		
74	Frank Richman	January 6, 1941	January 6, 1947	2191	Lake Forest College	University of Chicago Law School		
75	Mart O'Malley	January 4, 1943	January 3, 1949	2191	Saint Thomas College	Valparaiso University School of Law		
76	Howard Young Sr.	January 1, 1945	January 1, 1951	2191	University of Chicago	Indiana Law School		
77	Oliver Starr	January 1, 1945	January 1, 1951	2191	Indiana University	University of Michigan Law School		
78	Frank Gilkison	January 1, 1945	February 25, 1955	3707		Indiana University Maurer School of Law		
79	James Emmert	January 6, 1947	January 5, 1959	4381	Northwestern University	Harvard Law School		
80	Paul G. Jasper	January 3, 1949	March 31, 1953	1548	Indiana University	Indiana University Maurer School of Law		
81	Arch Bobbitt	January 2, 1951	January 7, 1963	4388	Central Normal College	Benjamin Harrison Law School		
82	Floyd Draper	January 2, 1951	January 10, 1955	1469		Valparaiso University School of Law		
83	Dan Flanagan	April 1, 1953	December 31, 1954	639	Butler University / University of California	Benjamin Harrison Law School		
84	Harold Achor	January 3, 1955	December 12, 1966	4361	Indiana Central College	Indiana University Maurer School of Law		
85	Isadore Levine	January 13, 1955	May 23, 1955	130	University of Michigan	University of Michigan Law School		
86	George Henley	March 15, 1955	May 23, 1955	69	Indiana University	Indiana University Maurer School of Law		
87	Frederick Landis Jr.	May 23, 1955	November 8, 1965	3822	Wabash College	Indiana University Maurer School of Law		
88	Norman Arterburn	May 23, 1955	May 13, 1977	8026	Indiana University	University of Chicago Law School		
89	Amos W. Jackson	January 5, 1959	January 4, 1971	4382	Hanover College			
90	Walter Myers Jr.	January 7, 1963	June 2, 1967	1607	Yale University	Yale Law School		
91	Frederick Rakestraw	January 7, 1966	January 2, 1967	360	Manchester College / Indiana University	Indiana University Maurer School of Law		
92	Donald Mote	January 3, 1967	September 17, 1968	623	DePauw University / Wabash College	George Washington University Law School		
93	David Lewis	June 21, 1967	January 6, 1969	565	DePauw University	University of Chicago Law School		
94	Donald Hunter	January 2, 1967	September 6, 1985	6822		Lincoln Law School (Indianapolis)		
95	Roger O. DeBruler	September 30, 1968	August 8, 1996	10174	Indiana University	Indiana University Maurer School of Law		
96	Richard M. Givan	January 6, 1969	December 31, 1994	9125	Indiana University	Indiana University Robert H. McKinney School of Law		
97	Dixon Prentice	January 4, 1971	January 6, 1986	5481	Indiana University	Indiana University Maurer School of Law		
98	Alfred Pivarnik	May 13, 1977	December 14, 1990	4963	Creighton University	Valparaiso University School of Law		
99	Randall Shepard	September 6, 1985	March 23, 2012	8306	Princeton University	Yale Law School	University of Virginia School of Law (LL.M.)	
100	Brent Dickson	January 6, 1986	April 29, 2016	11063	Purdue University	Indiana University Robert H. McKinney School of Law		
101	Jon Krahulik	December 14, 1990	October 31, 1993	1052	Indiana University	Indiana University Robert H. McKinney School of Law		
102	Frank Sullivan Jr.	November 1, 1993	July 31, 2012	6847	Dartmouth College	Indiana University Maurer School of Law	University of Virginia School of Law (LL.M.)	
103	Myra C. Selby	January 4, 1995	October 7, 1999	1737	Kalamazoo College	University of Michigan Law School		
104	Theodore Boehm	August 8, 1996	September 30, 2010	5166	Brown University	Harvard Law School		
105	Robert Rucker	November 19, 1999	May 12, 2017	5035	Indiana University Northwest	Valparaiso University School of Law	University of Virginia School of Law (LL.M.)	
106	Steven H. David	October 18, 2010	August 31, 2022	1049	Murray State University	Indiana University Robert H. McKinney School of Law		
107	Mark Massa	April 2, 2012	Present	517	Indiana University	Indiana University Robert H. McKinney School of Law		
108	Loretta Rush	November 7, 2012	Present	298	Purdue University	Indiana University Maurer School of Law		
109	Geoffrey G. Slaughter	June 13, 2016	Present		Indiana University	Indiana University Maurer School of Law		
110	Christopher M. Goff	July 24, 2017	Present		Ball State University	Indiana University Maurer School of Law		

† – There is a dispute between sources on Judge Olds' education. Gugin & St. Clair, Justices of the Indiana Supreme Court at 149 (2010) states, "Olds attended Capital University in Columbus, Ohio, and then read law with his brother, James." Browning, Humphrey, & Kleinschmidt. "Biographical Sketches of Indiana Supreme Court Justices," 30 Ind. Law Review 328, 367 (1997) states, "He studied law at The Ohio State University."

== Justices by school ==
=== Undergraduate and master's degrees ===
Current name of school	Former name(s) of school	Number of alumni
Amherst College		1
Ball State University		1
Bethany College		1
Brown University		1
Butler University	Northwestern Christian University of Indianapolis	5
Canterbury College (Indiana)	Central Normal College	4
Capital University		1†
College of William & Mary		1
County Seminary (Wilmington, OH)		1
Creighton University		1
Dartmouth College		2
DePauw University	Indiana Asbury University	8
Franklin College		1
Hanover College		3
Haverford College		1
Indiana University		19
Indiana University Northwest		1
Kalamazoo College		1
Lake Forest College		1
Manchester College		1
Marion County Seminary		1
Murray State		1
Northwestern University		1
Princeton University		2
Purdue University		2
Smithson College		1
Taylor University	Methodist College	1
Union University (New York)		1
University of California		1
University of Chicago		1
University of Indianapolis	Indiana Central College	1
University of Michigan		6
University of Notre Dame		2
University of Scranton	Saint Thomas College	1
Valparaiso University	Northern Indiana Normal School	1
Vincennes University		1
Wabash College		4
Washington & Jefferson College	Jefferson College	1
Williams College		1
Yale University		1

=== Masters of Laws (LL.M.) and Doctor of Juridical Science (S.J.D.) ===
Current name of school	Degree	Number of alumni
Harvard Law School	S.J.D.	1
University of Virginia School of Law	LL.M.	3

== See also ==
- Indiana Supreme Court
