= Walter Olds =

American judge (1846–1925)

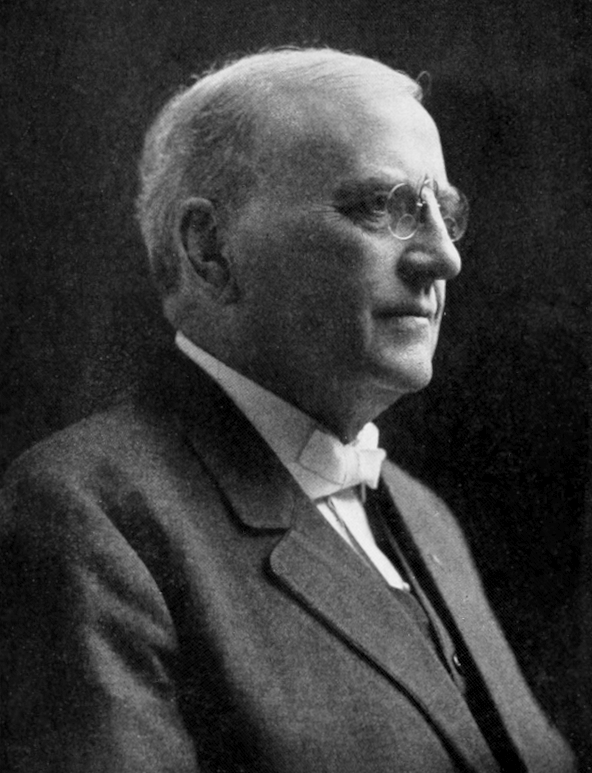

Justice of the Indiana Supreme Court
- In office January 7, 1889 – June 15, 1893
- Preceded by: Allen Zollars
- Succeeded by: Joseph S. Dailey

Personal details
- Born: August 11, 1846 Westfield Township, Morrow County, Ohio, US
- Died: July 30, 1925 (aged 78) Fort Wayne, Indiana, US

Walter Olds (August 11, 1846 – July 30, 1925) was an American lawyer, politician, and judge who served in the Indiana Senate and as a justice of the Indiana Supreme Court from January 7, 1889, to June 15, 1893.

== Biography ==
=== Early life, education, and military service ===
Olds was born in Westfield Township, Morrow County, Ohio to Benjamin Olds (originally from Pennsylvania, a Methodist minister and a veteran of the War of 1812, died 1862) and Abigail Olds (née Washburne, originally from New York). Walter Olds was educated in the public and union schools of Mount Gilead, Ohio.

In 1864, during the Civil War, Olds joined the Union Army, enlisting in Company A of the 174th Ohio Infantry Regiment, which fought primarily in Tennessee and North Carolina. Olds never advanced beyond the rank of private. Olds served until the war's end.

After the war, Olds returned to Ohio and went to Columbus to attend college. Sources disagree on whether Olds went to Ohio State University or Capital University. There is also a chance he attended both schools. Regardless, Olds got his degree and, in 1867, he returned to Mount Gilead to read law at the law office of Olds & Dickey, studying under one of the firm's co-owners and Walter's brother, Major James Olds.

In 1869, Olds was admitted to the Indiana bar. He moved to Columbia City, Indiana and began a private practice in partnership with a local lawyer and state senator named A.Y. Hooper. In 1873, a recent graduate of Wabash College named Thomas R. Marshall read law under Olds's guidance and tutelage at his Columbia City office. Marshall later was elected Governor of Indiana and then U.S. Vice President during the administration of Woodrow Wilson.

=== Political and judicial career ===
A member of the Republican Party, Olds served in the Indiana Senate from 1877 to 1879, representing Whitley and Kosciusko counties. He also served as judge of the state's 33rd Circuit Court from 1885 to 1888.

In 1888, Olds was elected to serve on the Indiana Supreme Court, succeeding Justice Allen Zollars. During his time on the court, Olds and his fellow Republican justices (often joined by the court's sole Democrat, Joseph Mitchell) struck down various laws passed by Democrats in the Indiana General Assembly which encroached on the separation of powers. In State ex rel. Hovey v. Noble, the court declared unconstitutional new legislation that would have a created a court commission that would have overseen (and likely try to influence) the court's activities. In State ex rel. Holt v. Denny (a case where Olds wrote the court's opinion), the Supreme Court struck down a bill that would have given the General Assembly the ability to intervene and control municipal police and fire departments. Due to financial difficulties, Olds resigned from the court in 1893 to accept a high-paying position at a law firm in Hammond (near Chicago) in partnership with Charles Fremont Griffin, former Indiana Secretary of State and Commander-in-Chief of the Sons of Union Veterans of the Civil War. Justice Joseph S. Dailey was appointed to succeed Olds to the bench.

During his time working with Griffin in Hammond, Olds represented a number of railroad companies and other large corporations. In 1901, he moved to Fort Wayne to set up a new private practice. In 1915, Olds ran for the Republican nomination for election to the U.S. Senate, but withdrew before the party convention.

=== Personal life and death ===
In 1873, while still residing in Mount Gilead, Olds married Marie J. Merritt (another Morrow County native). They had one child, a son named Lee M. Olds, who moved to San Francisco, California and served in the Spanish-American War as Major of the 161st Indiana Volunteer Infantry Regiment.

Olds died in Fort Wayne in 1925.

Political offices
Preceded by Allen Zollars	Justice of the Indiana Supreme Court; 1889–1893	Succeeded by Joseph S. Dailey
