= Justice McBride =

Justice McBride may refer to:

- Priestly H. McBride (1796–1869), associate justice of the Supreme Court of Missouri
- Robert McBride (Indiana judge) (1842–1926), associate justice of the Indiana Supreme Court
- Thomas A. McBride (1847–1930), chief justice of the Oregon Supreme Court
