= James Worden =

American judge (1819–1884)

Justice of the Indiana Supreme Court
- Appointed by: Ashbel P. Willard
- Preceded by: William Z. Stuart, James S. Frazer
- Succeeded by: James S. Frazer, William H. Coombs
- In office January 16, 1858 – January 3, 1865
- In office January 3, 1871 – December 2, 1882

Mayor of Fort Wayne
- In office 1865–1866
- Preceded by: Franklin P. Randall
- Succeeded by: Benjamin Saunders

James Lorenzo Worden (May 10, 1819 – June 10, 1884) was an American politician, lawyer, and judge who served as a justice on the Indiana Supreme Court from January 16, 1858, to January 3, 1865, and then again from January 3, 1871, to December 2, 1882. Worden also served briefly as Mayor of Fort Wayne from 1865 to 1866.

== Biography ==
=== Early life, education, and career ===
Worden was born in Sandisfield, Massachusetts, to John and Jane Worden. John Worden died when James was eight. After his death, the Wordens moved to become farmers in rural Portage County, Ohio, where James Worden attended public school.

Worden began studying law in 1838, working in the office of Thomas T. Straight, a prominent lawyer in Cincinnati. He was admitted to the bar in Lancaster in 1841. He opened a law office in Tiffin before moving to Columbia City, Indiana in 1844. In 1845, he moved to Albion, Indiana. In 1846, Worden moved to Fort Wayne, Indiana, after taking a liking to the city while visiting to assist in the prosecution of a local murder trial. Worden would live in Fort Wayne for the rest of his life.

=== Public service ===
In 1851, Worden became the prosecuting attorney for the 10th Indiana Circuit Court (which encompassed Allen, Adams, Wells, Huntington, Whitley, DeKalb, Noble, Steuben, LaGrange, Wabash, Elkhart, and Kosciusko counties). He later appointed a judge of the 10th Circuit Court in 1855 by Governor Joseph A. Wright. He was later elected to six-year term as a 10th Circuit Court judge, but ended up serving only until 1858, leaving the position when he was appointed to the Indiana Supreme Court.

Worden was appointed to the Supreme Court by Democratic governor Ashbel P. Willard to replace the retiring Justice William Z. Stuart. Worden's appointment followed considerable controversy over Stuart's departure. Following Stuart's announcement that he planned to resign from the court, an election was held to fill his position in 1857. Republican candidate Horace P. Biddle won the election, but Governor Willard claimed that, since Stuart's seat on the court was not vacant at the time the election took place (Stuart announced his resignation in 1857, but did not actually leave the court until January 1858), Biddle's election was illegitimate. Blocked from what he saw as his rightful seat on the bench, Biddle sued the Governor. The Supreme Court (which, at that time, had a majority of Democratic Justices who were political allies of Willard) sided with the governor in the case of Biddle v. Willard. Worden, a Democrat, was thereafter assigned to the position on the Supreme Court that Biddle had been denied by the ruling.

Serving on the court during the Civil War, Worden and his fellow justices dealt with many cases relating to imposition of martial law and the suspension of the writ of habeas corpus. Worden was part of a majority coalition on the court, led by Justice Samuel E. Perkins that opposed and challenged these measures. In Skeen v. Monkeimer, the court ruled that a man who had been accused of stealing a horse that belonged to the U.S. government had been arrested and jailed wrongly, as there was no evidence of his having committed this crime. In Griffin v. Wilcox, a case involving a saloon keeper who had been arrested and jailed after violating an order from the military banning the sale of alcohol to enlistees, the court sided with the saloon keeper and ruled that he had broken no civil law. Worden and his fellow Justices' challenges to these measure of martial law that encroached on civil liberties were eventually vindicated by the landmark U.S. Supreme Court ruling in Ex parte Milligan.

Worden served on the court for seven years, leaving in 1865. He ran for re-election in 1864, but lost during the Republican landslide that forced his Democratic colleagues on the court out of office as well. Worden was succeeded to the bench by Justice James S. Frazer. After leaving the court, Worden was elected mayor of Fort Wayne in 1865, but resigned from the position after only a year to focus on the demands of his growing law practice.

Worden returned to the Supreme Court in 1871, elected to succeed Justice Frazer. Worden was re-elected in 1876. Worden's return to the Indiana Supreme Court in the 1870s corresponded with a long period of Democratic control over the court. During this time, the court became embroiled in controversy following its ruling in the case of State v. Swift, when the Court invalidated the results of votes on seven new amendments to the state constitution. Critics attacked the court for the ruling, claiming that the decisions of Worden and his fellow Democratic Justices had been influenced by party politics. Worden left the court on December 10, 1882, resigning after being elected judge of the Allen County Superior Court. He was succeeded by Justice William H. Coombs.

=== Personal life and death ===
In 1845, while living in Columbia City, Worden met and married Anna Grable, daughter of the Whitley County treasurer. They had three sons. Their second son, Charles H. Worden, became President of the Hamilton National Bank of Fort Wayne, founded by Allen Hamilton.

Worden died in Fort Wayne on June 10, 1884.

Political offices
Preceded by William Z. Stuart; James S. Frazer	Justice of the Indiana Supreme Court; 1858–1865; 1871–1882	Succeeded by James S. Frazer; William H. Coombs
