= Willard Gemmill =

American judge (1875–1935)

Justice of the Indiana Supreme Court
- In office January 5, 1925 – January 4, 1931
- Preceded by: Fred Gause
- Succeeded by: Curtis Roll

Willard Beharrell Gemmill (August 7, 1875 – May 24, 1935) was an American lawyer, politician, and judge who served as a justice of the Indiana Supreme Court from January 5, 1925, to January 4, 1931.

== Biography ==
Gemmill was born in Rigdon, Indiana to Andrew and Maria Covalt Gemmill.

Gemmill attended DePauw University (in Greencastle) where he was class president and treasurer of the Orators Association. He graduated from DePauw with a PhB in 1897. He then attended Indiana Law School (now known as the Indiana University Robert H. McKinney School of Law, in Indianapolis), graduating in 1902 with a LL.B. Gemmill was admitted to the Indiana bar the same year he graduated and began practicing law in Marion.

Gemmill was a member of the Indiana House of Representatives from 1909 to 1911. He later served in the Indiana Senate from 1914 to 1918.

In 1918, Gemmill became Marion City Attorney, but resigned after one month to become the Special Deputy Attorney General of Indiana, under Ele Stansbury. He held the position from 1918 to 1920, resigning to resume his private practice in Marion.

Between his time as Deputy Attorney General and his time on the Supreme Court, Gemmill served as the president of the Grant County Bar Association.

Gemmill became a justice of the Indiana Supreme Court in 1925, succeeding Justice Fred Gause. He ran for re-election to the bench, but lost. He was succeeded to the court by Justice Curtis Roll in 1931.

After leaving the court, Gemmill returned to private practice in Marion with the firm of Gemmill, Brown & Campbell.

Gemmill was a member of the Delta Upsilon fraternity, having joined while a student at DePauw.

Gemmill's son, Robert A. Gemmill (d. 1989), was also a lawyer. Robert Gemmill started the Gemmill Foundation, which gives out scholarships.

Gemmill died in Marion in 1935.

Political offices
| Preceded by Fred Gause | Justice of the Indiana Supreme Court; 1925–1931 | Succeeded by Curtis Roll |
