= Alexander Dowling =

American judge (1839–1917)

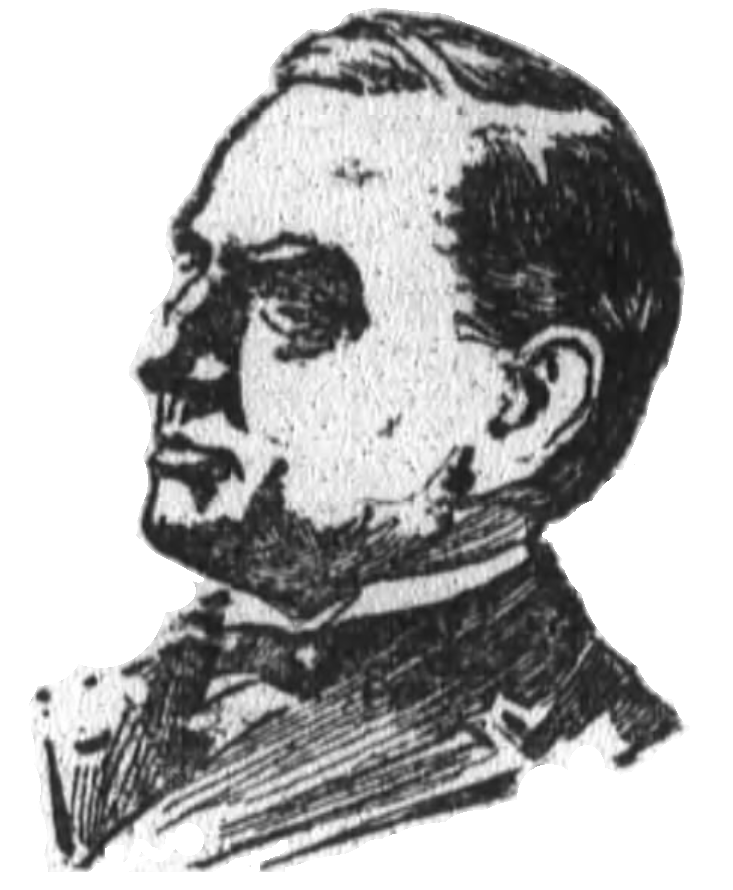
Newspaper sketch of Alexander Dowling during his campaign for election to the Indiana Supreme Court.

Alexander Dowling (December 19, 1839 – December 11, 1917) was a justice of the Indiana Supreme Court from January 2, 1899, to January 2, 1905.

== Early life and education ==
Born in Hillsboro, Loudoun County, Virginia. Dowling came with his parents to New Albany, Indiana, in 1840. His father, Henry M. Dowling, engaged in the practice of law in New Albany for many years, and at one time was engaged in the pharmacy business. Dowling attended the New Albany schools, and read law in the office of Otto & Davis, one of the prominent law firms of Southern Indiana, at that time, and was admitted to the bar of the Floyd Circuit Court on November 34, 1855.

== Legal and judicial career ==
Dowling took up the practice of law in New Albany, and served two terms as Prosecuting Attorney and also as City Attorney in New Albany from 1861 to 1865, from 1871 to 1875 and from 1883 to 1885. In politics Dowling was a Republican, and he was active in the affairs of his party for more than half a century. For many years Dowling was active in financial and commercial affairs in New Albany. He was one of the founders of the Mutual Trust and Deposit Company in that city, of which institution he was president at the time of his death. He also was a member of the board of directors of the New Albany National Bank for many years.

Governor Alvin Peterson Hovey offered to appoint Dowling to the Indiana Supreme Court in 1891, following the death of Justice John Berkshire, but Dowling declined. Dowling was elected to the Indiana Supreme Court on the Republican ticket in the election of 1898, serving from January 2, 1899, to January 2, 1905. During the time that he was a Judge of the Supreme Court he retained his residence in New Albany. He was not a candidate for re-election, preferring to resume his law practice in New Albany.

== Personal life and death ==
On October 13, 1859, Dowling married Miss Cornelia F. Kiger, of Greencastle, Ind. His wife died in 1899. They had two surviving children, Harry M. Dowling, who is engaged in the practice of law in Indianapolis, and Mrs. Charles Coffin, of that city. From the time of the death of his wife Dowling maintained his home at East Thirteenth and Spring streets in New Albany, where he lived alone until the time of his death.

In late November 1917, after having been engaged in the trial of a case in the Floyd Circuit Court in New Albany, Dowling went for lunch to his home, where he was stricken with a heart attack. He never fully recovered from the effects of the attack, though he was actively engaged in his work up to the time of his death.

Two weeks after his heart attack, Dowling was found dead in his office in the New Albany National Bank building, at Pearl and Market streets, at 9:30 in the morning. Dowling's daughter, who had been visiting her father for two weeks, departed for her home in Indianapolis only an hour before his death. He accompanied her to the interurban car, when she departed to take the Pennsylvania train at Jeffersonville, after which he walked through the snow to his office, preferring to walk rather than wait for a car, which was delayed on account of the bad weather.

His stenographer, Anna Gifford, arrived to find him on the floor. She summoned Dr. F. W. Hazlewood, who arrived in a few minutes and declared Dowling dead. Dowling was stricken while taking off his overcoat, his body being found with one arm remaining in the sleeve. The County Coroner determined that death was due to heart disease.

Political offices
Preceded by Leonard Hackney	Justice of the Indiana Supreme Court; 1899–1905	Succeeded by Oscar H. Montgomery
