= Pivarník =

Pivarník (feminine Pivarníková) is a Slovak surname. Notable people include:

- Alfred Pivarnik (1925–1995), American judge
- Ján Pivarník (born 1947), Slovak football player and manager
- Roman Pivarník (born 1967), Slovak football player and manager, son of Ján
- Angelina Pivarnick (born 1986), American television personality

== See also ==
- Alejandra Pizarnik
