= Allen Zollars =

American judge (1839–1909)

Fort Wayne City Attorney
- In office 1869–1875

Allen Superior Court Judge
- In office 1877–1877

Judge
- In office 1882–1882

Indiana Supreme Court Judge
- In office January 1, 1883 – January 7, 1889

Personal details
- Born: September 3, 1839 Licking, Ohio, US
- Died: December 20, 1909 (aged 70) Allen, Indiana, US
- Resting place: Fort Wayne, Allen, Indiana, US
- Party: Democratic
- Spouse: Marinda Holmes Ewing
- Children: 3
- Education: University of Michigan

Allen Zollars (September 3, 1839 – December 20, 1909) was a politician and judge in Indiana who served as a justice of the Indiana Supreme Court from January 1, 1883, to January 7, 1889.

== Biography ==
Zollars was born in Licking County, Ohio, to Frederick Zollars (December 11, 1801 – 1889) and Anna Whitmore (February 21, 1806-?). He received a B.A. from Denison University in Granville, Ohio, in or about 1863, and briefly studied law in Ohio before entering the University of Michigan Law School, where he received a Bachelor of Law in 1866.

He was elected as a Representative to the Indiana State in 1869, and also served as City Attorney of Fort Wayne, Indiana from 1869 to 1875. In 1877, he became the first person to serve as a judge of the Superior Court of Allen County, Indiana. He was elected to the Indiana Supreme Court in 1882, serving from 1883 to 1889, having failed to win reelection in 1888, a year when the Democratic Party did poorly throughout the state.

== Personal life ==
He married Marinda Holmes Ewing and had three children, Frederick L. Zollars (1869–1951), Charles Ewing Zollars (1875–1944), and Clara Zollars.

Zollars died in Fort Wayne at the age of 70.

Political offices
Preceded by William H. Coombs	Justice of the Indiana Supreme Court; 1883–1889	Succeeded by Walter Olds
