= Andrew L. Osborn =

American judge (1815–1891)

- Born: May 27, 1815; New Haven County, Connecticut, U.S.
- Died: April 13, 1891 (aged 75)
- Known for: justice of the Indiana Supreme Court

Andrew Lawrence Osborn (May 27, 1815 – April 13, 1891) was a justice of the Indiana Supreme Court from December 16, 1872, to January 4, 1875.

Born in New Haven County, Connecticut, Osborn received his early education in that state. At the age of twenty he moved to Chicago, where he worked as a printer while reading law. In 1826, he moved to Michigan City, Indiana, where he finished his studies. In 1838 he formed a partnership in the practice of law with a Judge Evarts, which continued until 1843. In May, 1844, he removed to La Porte, Indiana, and entered into a law partnership with Judge John B. Niles.

In August 1844, Osborn was elected to the Indiana House of Representatives serving in 1844 and 1845. He then served the Indiana Senate, serving from 1847 to 1849. In 1857 he was elected judge of the Circuit Court for the Ninth judicial district of Indiana, where he remained for thirteen years. In 1872 he was appointed by Governor Conrad Baker to a seat on the Supreme Court of Indiana, to a term expiring in January, 1875. His opinions written while in that position were well-regarded. After retiring from the bench he returned to the practice of law. He represented the Michigan Central Railroad Company from its organization until his death, a period of forty-one years.

Political offices
Preceded by Newly created seat	Justice of the Indiana Supreme Court; 1872–1875	Succeeded by Horace P. Biddle
