= John W. Spencer =

American judge (1864–1939)

John Wesley Spencer (March 7, 1864 – June 28, 1939) was a justice of the Indiana Supreme Court from April 15, 1912, to January 7, 1919.

Spencer was born in Mount Vernon, Indiana to attorney Elijah M. Spencer and Mary E. (Morse) Spencer, a member of the family of Samuel F. B. Morse. Spencer attended the schools of Mt. Vernon, graduated from the Mount Vernon High School in 1880, and attended Central Normal College in Danville, Indiana, for one year.

He then read law in his father's law office in Mount Vernon, and was admitted to practice on March 7, 1885, the day he turned twenty-one. After practicing at Mount Vernon until 1890, he was elected prosecuting attorney of the First judicial circuit, composed of Vanderburgh and Posey counties. In September 1891, he moved to Evansville, Indiana. He was re-elected prosecuting attorney in 1892 and served as such until October 22, 1895. From 1891 to 1911 Spencer was engaged in the practice of law at Evansville in partnership with John R. Brill under the firm name of Spencer & Brill. In 1909, Frank Hatfield became a member of the firm, and the name was changed to Spencer, Brill & Hatfield.

In 1896 Spencer was elected as a member of the Democratic state central committee to represent the First Congressional district, and was re-elected in 1898. In 1902 he was the Democratic nominee for Congress in the First Congressional district, but was defeated by James A. Hemenway, later a United States senator from Indiana. In 1904 he was a delegate to the Democratic national convention at St. Louis, and the same year was a candidate on the Democratic ticket for elector from the First district. In 1908 Spencer was one of the candidates on the Democratic ticket for elector at large from Indiana. In 1899 Spencer was a delegate at large to the antitrust conference held at Chicago, Illinois, having been appointed by Governor James A. Mount.

On November 9, 1911, Spencer was appointed judge of the Vanderburgh circuit court, succeeding Curran A. DeBruler. On March 26, 1912, after a spirited nomination contest, he was nominated by the Democratic state convention to contest a seat of the Supreme Court of Indiana representing the First Supreme Court judicial district. Less than one month later, on April 15, 1912, Spencer was appointed by Governor Thomas R. Marshall to a seat on the Supreme Court of Indiana vacated by the death of James H. Jordan. In November, 1912, Judge Spencer was elected to a full term of six years. Spencer wrote many of the important opinions handed down by the court, and became chief justice on May 26, 1913, serving until January 17, 1919.

== Personal life ==
On December 12, 1882, Spencer married Lillie L. Lichtenberger, of Mt. Vernon. At the time of his service on the Indiana Supreme Court, they had two living children, a daughter, Mrs. Alethea Vogel, of Dallas, Texas, and a son, John W. Jr., junior member of the law firm of Wittenbraker, McGinnis & Spencer, at Evansville. He died in Madison, Wisconsin.

Political offices
Preceded by James Jordan	Justice of the Indiana Supreme Court; 1912–1919	Succeeded by Benjamin Willoughby
