= Frank Sullivan Jr. =

American judge (born 1950)

102nd justice of the Supreme Court of Indiana
- In office November 1, 1993 – July 31, 2012
- Appointed by: Evan Bayh
- Preceded by: Jon D. Krahulik
- Succeeded by: Loretta H. Rush

Personal details
- Born: March 21, 1950 (age 76)
- Education: Dartmouth College (BA); Indiana University, Bloomington (JD); University of Virginia (LL.M)

Frank Sullivan Jr. (born March 21, 1950) was the 102nd justice of the Indiana Supreme Court. He served from November 1, 1993, to July 31, 2012. As of 2019 he is Professor of Practice at the Indiana University Robert H. McKinney School of Law.

Sullivan attended Dartmouth College, before receiving his legal education from Indiana University Maurer School of Law. He later achieved an LL.M. from the University of Virginia School of Law.

Political offices
Preceded by Jon D. Krahulik	Justice of the Indiana Supreme Court; 1993–2012	Succeeded by Loretta H. Rush
