= Joseph Mitchell (Indiana judge) =

American judge (1837–1890)

The Honorable Joseph Mitchell

Justice of the Indiana Supreme Court
- In office January 6, 1885 – December 12, 1890
- Preceded by: Edwin Hammond
- Succeeded by: John Berkshire

Personal details
- Born: December 21, 1837 Mercersburg, Pennsylvania, U.S.
- Died: December 12, 1890 (aged 52) Goshen, Indiana, U.S.

Joseph A. S. Mitchell (December 21, 1837 – December 12, 1890) was an American lawyer, politician, soldier, and judge who served as a justice of the Indiana Supreme Court from January 6, 1885, to December 12, 1890. Mitchell also served in the American Civil War as a captain in the 2nd Indiana Cavalry Regiment.

== Biography ==
Mitchell was born in 1837 near Mercersburg, Pennsylvania to Andrew Mitchell (of Scottish descent) and Sarah Mitchell (née Lecron, of French origin). He grew up on the family farm near Mercersburg until he was seventeen, when he moved to Blandinsville, Illinois in 1854 to become a student at Blandinsville Academy.

After a short education in Blandinsville, Mitchell became a school teacher. Returning to Pennsylvania in 1856 at age nineteen, he began to study law at the office of Riley & Sharp in Chambersburg.

In 1859, Mitchell was admitted to the Indiana bar. After travelling for several months in the South, Mitchell moved to his lifelong home of Goshen, Indiana in 1860. He opened up a private law practice, but following the outbreak of the Civil War, he left Goshen to serve in the Union Army.

Mitchell served in the war for two years, joining the 2nd Indiana Cavalry Regiment and attaining the rank of captain. He also served as inspector general on the staff of General Alexander McDowell McCook. Mitchell served in many notable battles fought in Kentucky and Tennessee: Shiloh, Chickamauga, Chattanooga, Lookout Mountain, Missionary Ridge, Resaca, and Kennesaw Mountain. Mitchell also participated in Stoneman's 1863 raid in Virginia.

Mitchell returned to practice law in Goshen following his service in the war. In 1865, he founded the legal firm of Baker & Mitchell with his cousin, John H. Baker, who would later serve as a judge of the United States District Court for the District of Indiana and as a U.S. Representative from Indiana. Other lawyers at the firm included Francis E. Baker (John H. Baker's son, a United States Circuit Court judge) and Charles W. Miller (Indiana Attorney General and U.S. Attorney for the District of Indiana). Baker & Mitchell would become one of the most prominent law firms of Northern Indiana. Mitchell served as Goshen's first city attorney and helped to draft the city ordinances following incorporation. From 1872 to 1874, Mitchell served as the third mayor of Goshen. In 1879, the Indiana State Bar Association chose Mitchell to be one of their delegates to a legal convention in Saratoga, New York. Another member of this three-person delegation was future U.S. President Benjamin Harrison. Additionally, Mitchell served as legal counsel for the Lake Shore & Michigan Southern Railway Company and as a member of the board of trustees of DePauw University.

In 1865, Mitchell married Mary E. Defrees of the prominent Defrees political family of Indiana. Mitchell's father in law was U.S. Representative from Indiana, Joseph H. Defrees, and his uncle-in-law was John D. Defrees, a newspaper publishing magnate and Superintendent of the U.S. Government Printing Office under Abraham Lincoln. Mitchell's marriage also made him a relative of James S. Frazer, a former Indiana Supreme Court Justice who also married into the Defrees family. As mentioned, Mitchell was a cousin of John H. Baker, and is thereby related to his son, Francis E. Baker, another Indiana Supreme Court justice. Joseph and Mary Mitchell had two children. Mitchell was raised in a Presbyterian family, but was active in Goshen's First Methodist Church.

In 1880, Mitchell was the Democratic candidate for a seat on the Indiana Supreme Court. He was defeated that year, but ran again in 1884 and won, succeeding Justice Edwin Hammond to the bench. While serving on the bench, Mitchell helped resolve a legal dispute between the owners of a dam on the St. Joseph River in South Bend. He was re-elected to his seat on the bench in 1890, but died weeks after his re-election, at the age of 52. Justice Robert McBride was appointed to Mitchell's now vacant seat. Mitchell was eulogized by fellow Indiana Supreme Court Justice Byron Elliott at his funeral in Goshen.

In 2009, Goshen mayor Allan Kauffman announced that the city would purchase Mitchell's historic Queen Anne style (built circa 1870) house to renovate and preserve it.

Political offices
Preceded by Edwin Hammond	Justice of the Indiana Supreme Court; 1885–1890	Succeeded by Robert McBride
