= Jon Krahulik =

American judge (1944–2005)

Justice of the Indiana Supreme Court
- In office December 14, 1990 – October 31, 1993
- Preceded by: Alfred Pivarnik
- Succeeded by: Frank Sullivan Jr.

Jon David Krahulik (December 31, 1944 – September 6, 2005) was an American lawyer, politician, and judge who served as a justice of the Indiana Supreme Court from December 14, 1990, to October 31, 1993.

== Biography ==
=== Early life, education, and career ===
Krahulik was born in Indianapolis, Indiana. His father was an immigrant from Czechoslovakia.

Krahulik graduated from North Central High School. He then attended Indiana University Bloomington, receiving his A.B. in 1965. He received his legal education at the Indiana University Robert H. McKinney School of Law, graduating in 1969 with a J.D. He was first admitted to the Indiana bar and was later admitted to practice before the United States Court of Appeals for the Seventh Circuit, the United States District Court for the Southern District of Indiana, and the United States Tax Court.

From 1967 to 1969, Krahulik was a member of the editorial board of the journal Indiana Legal Forum, the predecessor to the Indiana Law Review.

Krahulik practiced law in Indianapolis, first with the firm of Baker & Daniels (1969–1971) and then with the firm of Bingham, Summers, Welsh, & Spilman (1971–1990). Krahulik served as director of the Indiana Lawyers Commission in 1973.

In 1987, Krahulik represented Indiana Secretary of State Evan Bayh in the case of State Election Board v. Bayh following a legal challenge by state Republicans who claimed Bayh was ineligible to run for Governor because he did not meet the residency requirements of the state constitution. Krahulik argued in Bayh's defense before the Indiana Supreme Court and the court ruled unanimously in Krahulik and Bayh's favor.

=== Judicial career and later life ===
In 1990, Krahulik was appointed to the Indiana Supreme Court by Evan Bayh, who was now the Governor, to succeed the retiring Justice Alfred Pivarnik. During his time on the bench, Krahulik emerged as a prominent defender of the jury system, authored important opinions on tort law, helped to create the Indiana Rules of Evidence, and also recommended to the Court the adoption of the "IOLTA" ("interest on lawyer trust accounts") program that granted lower-income Hoosiers greater access to the judicial system. During his time on the court, Krahulik authored 141 opinions. Krahulik resigned from the bench in 1993 to become president and chief operating officer of Chemed Corporation in Cincinnati. He was succeeded to the court by Justice Frank Sullivan Jr.

In 1992, Krahulik became an adjunct professor at Indiana University Robert H. McKinney School of Law, teaching State Constitutional Law.

Krahulik participated in the 1992 Ironman World Championship in Hawaii.

Krahulik held his position at Chemed Corporation only briefly, quickly returning to Indianapolis to practice law with his sons, David and Sam.

Krahulik died in 2005.

Political offices
Preceded by Alfred Pivarnik	Justice of the Indiana Supreme Court; 1990–1993	Succeeded by Frank Sullivan Jr.
