= George Howk =

American judge (1824–1892)

Justice of the Indiana Supreme Court
- In office January 1, 1877 – January 7, 1889
- Preceded by: Alexander Downey
- Succeeded by: John Berkshire

George Vail Howk (September 21, 1824 – January 13, 1892) was an American lawyer, politician, and judge who served in the Indiana House of Representatives, the Indiana Senate, and as a justice of the Indiana Supreme Court from January 1, 1877, to January 7, 1889.

== Biography ==
=== Early life and education ===
Born in Charlestown, Indiana, Howk's family is of German origin and originally settled in Berkshire County, Massachusetts. George Howk's father, Isaac Howk, was a farmer who attended Williams College before settling in Charlestown in 1817. In Charlestown, Isaac Howk married George Howk's mother, Elvira Vail, daughter of a local doctor from Vermont. Isaac Howk served in the Indiana House of Representatives and later became Speaker of the House. He ran unsuccessfully as an independent for a seat in the U.S. House of Representatives in 1830. He was also a Freemason, elected senior grand deacon of Charlestown's Burning Star Lodge. Isaac Howk died in 1833.

George Howk grew up in Charlestown. He attended DePauw University (then known as Indiana Asbury University) in Greencastle, graduating in 1846. He was a classmate of future U.S. Senator from California, Newton Booth. Howk studied law under Judge Charles Dewey (a former justice of the Indiana Supreme Court) and would marry Dewey's eldest daughter.

=== Legal career, judicial service, and later life ===
Howk was admitted to the bar in 1847. In 1848, he moved to New Albany. Howk was a member of New Albany's city council from 1850 to 1864 and was also the city judge of New Albany from 1852 to 1853. In 1857, Howk became the judge of the Court of Common Pleas of Floyd County. In 1863, he was elected to represent Floyd County in the Indiana House of Representatives. From 1866 to 1870, he represented Floyd and Clark counties in the Indiana Senate. Howk was a Democrat.

Howk was elected to the Indiana Supreme Court in 1876 to succeed Justice Alexander Downey. Howk served on the court from 1877 to 1889. He was succeeded to the bench by Justice John Berkshire. After leaving the court, Howk returned to his private law practice in New Albany and was later appointed judge of the Floyd County Circuit Court.

=== Personal life and death ===
Howk married twice. First, in 1848, he married Eleanor Dewey, eldest daughter of former Indiana Supreme Court justice and Howk's mentor, Charles Dewey. They had two children together before Eleanor died in 1853. In 1854, Howk remarried to Jane Simonson, daughter of U.S. Army General John S. Simonson. Howk fathered two more children with Simonson. Howk was a Christian but did not identify with any particular denomination; his mother was a Methodist but his second wife and their children were Presbyterians. One of George and Jane Howk's sons, Rev. Dr. John Simonson Howk, became a pastor of the First Presbyterian Church of Jeffersonville.

Howk died in New Albany in 1892.

Political offices
| Preceded by Alexander Downey | Justice of the Indiana Supreme Court; 1877–1889 | Succeeded by John Berkshire |
