= Frank Richman =

American judge (1881–1956)

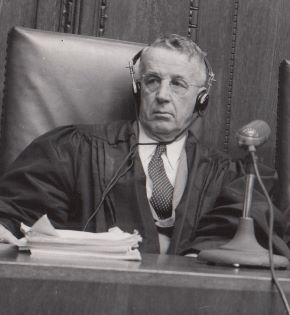

Justice of the Indiana Supreme Court
- In office January 6, 1941 – January 6, 1947
- Preceded by: George Tremain
- Succeeded by: James Emmert

Frank Nelson Richman (July 1, 1881 – April 29, 1956) was an American lawyer, politician, and judge who served as a justice of the Indiana Supreme Court from January 6, 1941, to January 6, 1947. Richman also participated as a judge in the Nuremberg trials, as one of the judges of the Flick trial.

== Biography ==
=== Early life and education ===
Richman was born in Columbus, Indiana, to Silas Tevis Richman (1852–1938) and Elma Jane Richman (née Baker, 1857–1953). On his father's side, Frank Richman was descended from German Quakers (later Methodists) who settled originally in Salem County, New Jersey. Silas Richman, originally from Decatur County, worked first as a schoolteacher and then as a medical doctor. On his mother's side, the Baker family were originally from Rowan County, North Carolina and were also Methodists. Silas Richman met Elma Baker while he was teaching school in Jamestown. They had two children; Frank and his older sister, Alice.

At a young age, Frank Richman and his family moved to Princeton, Kansas, where his father operated a general practice. In 1892, when Frank was eleven, the Richmans moved to the South Side of Chicago, Illinois, where his father opened another general practice until his retirement in 1927. Frank Richman graduated from Englewood High School at age 16.

Frank Richman began his higher education at Northwestern University (in Evanston, Illinois), originally planning to become a doctor like his father before discovering that he disliked working with cadavers. He then attended Lake Forest College (in Lake Forest, Illinois), where he was a member of the school's glee club, played for the college's baseball team, worked as a chapel organist, won prizes in composition and debate, and also served as the editor-in-chief of the school newspaper, the Stentor. Richman graduated from Lake Forest College in 1904 with an A.B. For two years, he worked as a newspaper reporter in Rockford, Illinois and La Crosse, Wisconsin. In 1906, he began studying law at the University of Chicago Law School, leaving the school in 1908 without obtaining a Juris Doctor degree. He moved his family back to the town where he was born, Columbus. He was admitted to the Bartholomew County bar and began practicing law at Baker & Richman (later Baker, Richman & Sharpnack) from 1908 to 1933. He finally got his law degree in 1940, taking his final classes at the Indiana University Maurer School of Law in Bloomington.

=== Judicial service and later life ===
Richman was a member of the Indiana State Bar Association, serving as the association's president from 1931 to 1932. During this time, Richman authored an influential article in the Indiana Law Journal, titled "A Majority of Electors Means a Majority of Those Voting on the Question." The article (in addition to a brief written by a committee of bar association members that Richman was a part of) led to an important ruling by the state Supreme Court decision, in the case of In re Todd, which overturned their 1870s ruling in the case of State V. Swift, where the court had invalidated the results of a referendum regarding new amendments to the state constitution. Richman's article also led to other important state Supreme Court rulings in the cases of In re Denny and In re Boswell, and also led to the removal of section 21 of article 7 of the state constitution. The removal of this section allowed for the Indiana Supreme Court to regulate admission to the Indiana bar via the new state Board of Law Examiners (created in 1931 via legislation enacted by the General Assembly), whose members were appointed by the Supreme Court.

Richman, a Republican, was elected to the Indiana Supreme Court and began serving on the bench in 1941, succeeding Justice George Tremain. Richman was known as a moderate at a time when the Indiana Republican Party was becoming more conservative. At the Indiana Republican Party convention of 1946, Richman was purged from the party due to his dissent in the case of State ex rel. v. Montgomery Circuit Court, which blocked Governor Ralph Gates's plans to reform state alcohol laws. He left the court in 1947, succeeded by Justice James Emmert.

Starting in 1944, Richman began to teach part-time at Indiana University Robert H. McKinney School of Law (in Indianapolis). After leaving the Supreme Court, Richman became a professor of law at the school, teaching procedure, equity, and corporate law, until his retirement from that position in 1952.

In 1947, following the end of the Second World War, Richman traveled to Nuremberg, Germany to participate in the Nuremberg trials of members and supporters of the Nazi regime. Richman served as a judge of Division IV of the American Military Tribunal. Richman was one of the judges assigned to the Flick trial, with the defendants being prominent Nazi industrialists. The trial took nine months and resulted in three of the industrialists being found guilty and the other three being acquitted.

=== Personal life and death ===
Richman was a member of the Columbia Club in Indianapolis. He was a charter member and later President of the Rotary Club in Columbus. He was also a founder of both the Columbus Boys' Club and the Bartholomew County Historical Society. From 1922 to 1939, he was chairman of the Columbus chapter of the American Red Cross. He chaired the Indiana Judicial Council and was a member of the Bartholomew County Bar Association, the American Bar Association, and the American Judicature Society. He was also a member of Phi Delta Phi and the Order of the Coif. Richman's hobbies included fishing, traveling, and playing golf and contract bridge.

In 1908, Richman married Edith Rogers. They married on Christmas Eve in Studley, Kansas, on the sheep ranch owned by Edith's parents. They had four children, one son and three daughters. All four children attended Indiana University.

Richman died of colon cancer at his home in Indianapolis in 1956.

Political offices
| Preceded by George Tremain | Justice of the Indiana Supreme Court; 1941–1947 | Succeeded by James Emmert |
