= Howard L. Townsend =

American judge (1871–1950)

Howard L. Townsend (1871 – March 20, 1950) was a justice of the Indiana Supreme Court from October 5, 1917, to November 1, 1923.

Born in Edon, Ohio, Townsend attended Angola High School and received an A.B. from Bethany College in West Virginia, and an LL.B. from Chicago-Kent College of Law. He entered the practice of law in Fort Wayne, Indiana in 1904.

In 1917, Governor James P. Goodrich appointed Townsend to a seat on the Indiana Supreme Court vacated by the death of Richard K. Erwin. Townsend was subsequently elected to fill the remainder of the term, retiring from the court in 1923 to resume the practice of law.

Townsend died while vacationing in Vero Beach, Florida, following a stroke.

Political offices
Preceded by Richard K. Erwin	Justice of the Indiana Supreme Court; 1917–1923	Succeeded by Fred C. Gause
