= Joseph S. Dailey =

American judge (1844–1905)

Justice of the Indiana Supreme Court
- In office June 25, 1893 – January 7, 1895
- Appointed by: Claude Matthews
- Preceded by: Walter Olds
- Succeeded by: Leander J. Monks

Joseph S. Dailey (May 31, 1844 – October 9, 1905) was an American politician, lawyer, and judge who served as a justice of the Indiana Supreme Court from June 25, 1893, to January 7, 1895.

== Biography ==
Joseph Dailey was born in Lancaster Township, Wells County, Indiana to James Dailey (Lancaster Township's first justice of the peace) and Lydia Dailey (née Garton). His family is of Irish descent. Both of Dailey's grandfathers were New Jersey natives and also both served in the War of 1812. He was the fifth of James and Lydia's nine children. Joseph Dailey's brother, Lewis "Lew" Dailey, enlisted in the Union army following the outbreak of the Civil War and died while fighting in the conflict. The local post of the American Legion in Bluffton was named the Lew Dailey Post in his honor.

Joseph Dailey was educated in the public schools of Bluffton before studying law for two years at the local law office of Newton Burwell. Dailey also taught school in Bluffton and elsewhere in Wells County.

In 1866, Dailey graduated from the Law School of Indiana University in Bloomington. That same year, he was admitted to the Indiana bar and returned to Bluffton to open a private practice in partnership with George S. Brown.

In 1866, Dailey—a Democrat—was elected district attorney of the common pleas court. In 1868, he was elected prosecuting attorney of the 10th Indiana Judicial Circuit Court (comprising Wells, Huntington, Adams, Allen, and Whitley counties). He was re-elected to this position in 1870, 1872, and 1874. In 1878, Dailey was elected to serve in the Indiana House of Representatives. In 1882, he was the Democratic nominee for a seat in the U.S. House of Representatives, but was defeated. He returned to his private practice until 1888, when he was elected judge of the 28th Circuit Court (comprising Wells and Huntington counties).

In 1893, Dailey was appointed by Governor Claude Matthews to the Indiana Supreme Court following the resignation of Justice Walter Olds. Dailey authored more than eighty opinions while serving on the bench. Dailey left the court in 1895 and was succeeded by Justice Leander J. Monks. After leaving the court, Dailey returned to Bluffton to practice law with his son, Frank C. Dailey.

Dailey married Emma Gutelius in Bluffton in 1870. They had four children, including the aforementioned Frank C. Dailey (a lawyer like his father), Lewis W. Dailey (a dentist), and Charles G. Dailey (principal of Bluffton High School).

Dailey died in Bluffton in 1905.

Political offices
Preceded by Walter Olds	Justice of the Indiana Supreme Court; 1893–1895	Succeeded by Leander Monks
