= Silas Coffey =

American judge (1839–1904)

Silas Demarcus Coffey (February 23, 1839 – March 6, 1904) was a justice of the Indiana Supreme Court from January 7, 1889, to January 7, 1895.

== Early life, education, and military service ==
Born in Owen County, Indiana, Coffey attended Indiana University at Bloomington in 1860, but "withdrew when the Civil War erupted". He enlisted in the Union Army for a three-month tour of duty. His regiment, the Fourteenth Indiana Infantry, was deployed, and remained in the military for three years. While serving, "[h]e carried a copy of Blackstone's Commentaries with him", and "studied while halting on a march and read at night by the light of the campfires". He served actively until June 1863, when he was transferred to the Veteran Reserve Corps for the remainder of his service.

== Legal and judicial career ==
Coffey returned to private life on November 1, 1864, and continued to study law, entering private practice in Bowling Green, Indiana, then the county seat of Clay County. He partnered with influential Indiana Bar member Allen T. Rose until 1868, and then with Major W. W. Carter.

During this time, Coffey "was an active participant in the Republican Party". On March 25, 1881, Governor Porter appointed Coffey to a seat on the Indiana Circuit Court, to fill the unexpired term of Judge Turman. In June of the following year, Coffey "was nominated by acclamation to continue the position of circuit judge", serving until his election to the Indiana Supreme Court in 1888.

Coffey retired from the bench in 1895, returning to private practice in Brazil, Indiana, in partnership with Judge McGregor, until his death.

== Personal life ==
Coffey married Caroline Byles, from a Pennsylvania family, with whom he had six children, of whom three daughters and one son lived.

He died in Brazil, Indiana. The Clay County Bar passed a resolution stating, of Coffey, "In his death this community has lost a useful and valuable citizen; the bar has lost an able lawyer, and his family a kind, devoted, and affectionate husband and father".

Political offices
Preceded by William E. Niblack	Justice of the Indiana Supreme Court; 1889–1895	Succeeded by James H. Jordan
