= Leonard Hackney =

American judge (1855–1938)

Justice of the Indiana Supreme Court
- In office January 2, 1893 – January 2, 1899
- Preceded by: John Miller
- Succeeded by: Alexander Dowling

Leonard J. Hackney (March 29, 1855 – October 3, 1938) was an American lawyer, politician, and judge who served as a justice of the Indiana Supreme Court from January 2, 1893, to January 2, 1899.

== Biography ==
=== Early life and education ===
Born in Edinburgh, Indiana, Hackney's only formal education was at the local schoolhouse, where he attended for five terms.

=== Legal career, judicial service, and later life ===
At age sixteen, Hackney became a law clerk at the firm of Hord & Blair in Shelbyville. He was briefly employed at a law office in Kokomo in 1873 and then another office in Indianapolis, run by Kendall M. Hord, who Hackney knew from his clerk job back in Shelbyville. In 1876, Hackney was admitted to the Indiana bar and returned to Shelbyville to open his own private law practice. He represented several large railroad companies and was perceived by the public to be in the pocket of the Cleveland, Cincinnati, Chicago and St. Louis Railway company, known as the "Big Four Railroad."

In 1878, Hackney, a Democrat, was elected prosecuting attorney of Shelby County. He served one term in the position and then returned to his private practice. In 1888, he was elected judge of Indiana's Sixteenth Circuit Court after a controversial campaign. Before Hackney's election to the position, the Shelby County Circuit Court judge was his old friend, Kendall M. Hord, who had to resign after being accused of bribery. Later, Hackney himself was accused of bribery, with a local newspaper charging that he paid off local Democratic Party officials to secure his nomination as their candidate in the election. Hackney denied wrongdoing while giving a speech about tariffs at the local Shelbyville Opera Hall. Despite the controversy, Hackney won the election and was seated as judge.

In 1892, Hackney was elected to the Indiana Supreme Court to succeed Justice John Miller. Hackney's most famous opinion from his time on the bench came in the famous case of Re Petition of Leach, Ex Parte, involving a woman, Antoinette Dakin Leach, who had been denied admission to the Indiana bar because she legally prohibited from voting. In their ruling, Hackney and his fellow justices ruled in favor of Leach, overturning a lower court's ruling against her, and striking down laws that barred women from practicing law. In his opinion, Hackney wrote, "If nature has endowed women with wisdom, if our colleges have given her education, if her energy and diligence have led her to a knowledge of the law, and if her ambition directs her to adopt the profession, shall it be said that forgotten fictions must bar the door against her?" The case set a powerful precedent that paved the way for women gaining the right to vote in Indiana and the repeal of similar laws banning women from being lawyers in other states. Hackney later wrote the opinion in another important case regarding women's suffrage, Gougar v. Timberlake, involving a woman from Tippecanoe County named Helen M. Gougar who sued after being denied the right to vote. Hackney and the court sided against Gougar, saying the Indiana Constitution did not allow women to vote. Hackney did not seek re-election to his seat on the court. He was succeeded to the bench by Justice Alexander Dowling.

After leaving the court, Hackney moved to Cincinnati and became general counsel to the Cleveland, Cincinnati, Chicago and St. Louis Railway. He worked for the company until retiring in 1928, moving to Winter Park, Florida, where he became a patron of Rollins College.

=== Death ===
Hackney died in Winter Park in 1938.

Political offices
Preceded by John Miller	Justice of the Indiana Supreme Court; 1893-1899	Succeeded by Alexander Dowling
