= George Tremain =

American judge (1874–1948)

George Lee Tremain
- Born: April 6, 1874; Hartsville, Indiana, U.S.
- Died: February 8, 1948 (aged 73); Greensburg, Indiana, U.S.
- Education: Canterbury College; Indiana Law School
- Occupations: Lawyer, politician, judge
- Years active: 1901–1940
- Notable work: Justice of the Indiana Supreme Court (1935–1940)
- Spouse: Mary Littell
- Relatives: Milton A. Tremain (brother)

George Lee Tremain (April 6, 1874 – February 8, 1948) was an American lawyer, politician, and Judge who served as a justice of the Indiana Supreme Court from January 1, 1935, to December 31, 1940.

== Biography ==
=== Early life and education ===
Tremain was born in Hartsville, Indiana, to John W. Tremain (a Decatur County commissioner) and Eliza E. Tremain (née Jones). George Tremain's brother, Milton A. Tremain, became a physician.

In 1894, Tremain began attending Central Normal College in Danville (now known as Canterbury College). From 1894 to 1898, he left Central Normal College to teach school. In 1898, he re-entered Central Normal College. In 1899, he began attending Indiana Law School in Indianapolis (now known as Indiana University Robert H. McKinney School of Law), graduating in 1900.

In 1901, Tremain began practicing law in Greensburg with Barton Porter, and then with Judge James K. Ewing. Tremain specialized in criminal law. In 1907, Tremain formed a partnership with Rollin A. Turner.

=== Judicial service and later life ===
In 1934, Tremain was elected to the Indiana Supreme Court to succeed Justice David Myers.

In 1937, Tremain was involved in the controversial case of Joel Baker and Peter Cancilla, who were arrested and charged with assault and battery with the intent to kill after they attacked Wayne Coy, the State Welfare Director, at the Indiana Statehouse. Criminal Court Judge Frank P. Baker was controversially selected to handle the ensuing trial—Joel Baker was an associate of Judge Baker's and had worked with him in the courtroom as an investigator, so many feared Judge Baker would be unable to handle the case without bias. Judge Baker refused to arraign Joel Baker and Cancilla, causing Justice Tremain to issue a writ of prohibition, ordering Judge Baker to take no further action in the Baker-Cancilla case, fearing that the defendants might be able to take advantage of a legal loophole to claim double jeopardy.

Tremain wrote the court's opinion in the 1940 case, Sanders v. State, involving the conviction of a man under Indiana's sodomy law despite the limitation on character witnesses at the man's trial. Tremain wrote in his opinion, "[The sodomy law] gives no other definition of the crime, obviously out of regard to the better sentiments of decent humanity, and to leave the record undefiled by details. The court has read the evidence in the record, and for the same reasons which influenced the framers of the statute, refuses to defile the reports by a recital of the sordid, immoral, depraved, and detestable statements therein contained."

Tremain left the court in 1940, succeeded by Justice Frank Richman. After leaving the court, Tremain resumed his private practice of law in Greensburg. Tremain was a member of the Indiana State Bar Association, serving on the organization's Board of Managers. He was also a member of the American Bar Association.

=== Personal life and death ===
In 1910, Tremain married Mary Littell. In 1907, Littell helped organize the local Omega chapter of Kappa Kappa Kappa, which engaged in charitable work around Greensburg. Littell became the chapter's first president.

Tremain died in Greensburg in 1948.

Political offices
Preceded by David Myers	Justice of the Indiana Supreme Court; 1935–1940	Succeeded by Frank Richman
