= James Emmert =

American judge (1895–1974)

Justice of the Indiana Supreme Court
- In office January 6, 1947 – January 5, 1959
- Preceded by: Frank Richman
- Succeeded by: Amos W. Jackson

31st Indiana Attorney General
- In office 1943–1947
- Preceded by: George N. Beamer
- Succeeded by: Cleon H. Foust

Personal details
- Born: September 26, 1895 Laurel, Indiana, U.S.
- Died: April 14, 1974 (aged 78) Shelbyville, Indiana, U.S.

James A. Emmert (September 26, 1895 – April 14, 1974) was an American lawyer, politician, and judge who served as Indiana Attorney General from 1943 to 1947 and as a justice of the Indiana Supreme Court from 1947 to 1959.

== Biography ==
=== Early life and education ===
Emmert was born in Laurel, Indiana to Clinton B. Emmert and Alice Emmert (née Patterson).

Emmert attended and graduated from Clarksburg High School in Clarksburg and the Tennessee Military Institute in Sweetwater.

Emmert served in the First World War, working at a British military general hospital in France for twenty-two months.

Emmert attended Northwestern University in Evanston, Illinois as an undergraduate. He got his legal education and degree from Harvard Law School in Cambridge, Massachusetts. While at Harvard, Emmert was a research student working under Felix Frankfurter, later an associate justice of the United States Supreme Court. Frankfurter said that Emmert was "the best research student [he] ever had at Harvard."

=== Judicial service and later life ===
In 1923, after receiving his degree, Emmert opened a law practice in Shelbyville, Indiana. In 1925, Emmert was elected mayor of Shelbyville. In 1928, he was elected judge of the Shelby County Circuit Court. He was re-elected to the position in 1934, serving until 1940, when he returned to private practice in partnership with M.O. Sullivan and Ralph Adams.

Emmert, a Republican, was an unsuccessful candidate in the 1940 Indiana gubernatorial election. That same year, amid the Second World War, Emmert assisted in the foundation of the Indiana State Guard, serving as the first commanding officer of the First Battalion, Fourth Regiment. In 1942, Emmert was elected Indiana Attorney General and was later re-elected to the position in 1944. Emmert began living in his office in the Indiana Statehouse in order to avoid having to travel back to Shelbyville.

In 1946, Emmert was elected to the Indiana Supreme Court, succeeding Justice Frank Richman. He left the bench in 1959, succeeded by Justice Amos W. Jackson.

After leaving the court, Emmert returned to Shelbyville and began practicing law in partnership with James M. Robinson.

=== Personal life and death ===
In 1929, Emmert married Bernice L. Foster in Indianapolis. They had two daughters.

Emmert was described as an expert rifleman and a life member of the National Rifle Association of America. The Shelbyville branch of the Fraternal Order of Police named a local pistol range in honor of Emmert. Emmert was a member of the Indiana State Bar Association and the Pioneer Society of Indiana. He was also a Methodist and a Freemason, being a member of the Greensburg Masonic Lodge for fifty years.

Emmert died in Shelbyville in 1974.

Political offices
Preceded by George N. Beamer	Indiana Attorney General; 1943-1947	Succeeded by Cleon H. Foust
Preceded by Frank Richman	Justice of the Indiana Supreme Court; 1947-1959	Succeeded by Amos W. Jackson
