= Alexander Downey =

American judge (1817–1898)

Alexander Cummings Downey (September 10, 1817 – March 26, 1898) was a justice of the Indiana Supreme Court from January 3, 1871, to January 1, 1877.

== Early life and education ==
Born in Hamilton County, Ohio, to John and Susannah (Selwood) Downey, in 1818 the family moved to Dearborn County, Indiana, where Downey received a common school education, finishing his schooling at the County Seminary of Wilmington, Indiana.

He studied law with James T. Brown and gained admission to the bar in 1841. In 1844 he moved to Rising Sun, Indiana, which he maintained as his home for the rest of his life.

== Career ==
In 1850 was appointed Circuit Judge by Governor Joseph A. Wright. He was elected to the office in 1851 and re-elected in 1852 under the new Constitution, serving until August 1858. He then resigned to engage in practice. From 1854 to 1858 he also established and conducted the law department of Asbury University which later became DePauw University. He was a member of the Indiana State Senate from 1863 to 1865. In 1870 he was elected as a Democrat to a seat on the Supreme court of Indiana. At one point in 1871 Downey was briefly discussed as a possible vice presidential candidate for prospective presidential candidate John T. Hoffman, then Governor of New York, who sought "a prominent Western man" to balance the ticket and counter the candidacy of Indiana senator Thomas A. Hendricks. Downey declined renomination to the court in 1877 and returned to active practice. He served for a time as president of the Asbury University board of trustees. He had the degree of Doctor of Laws conferred on him in 1858 by Asbury University, and the same in 1871 by Indiana University.

== Personal life and death ==
On April 19, 1846, Downey married Sophia J. Tapley, with whom he had eight children. Downey died at his home in Rising Sun, from apoplexy, at the age 80.

Political offices
Preceded by Jehu Elliott	Justice of the Indiana Supreme Court; 1871–1877	Succeeded by George Howk
