= William Z. Stuart =

American judge (1811–1876)

William Z. Stuart (December 25, 1811 – May 6, 1876) was a justice of the Indiana Supreme Court from January 3, 1853, to January 3, 1858.

== Early life and education ==
Born in Dedham, Massachusetts, Stuart was the son of Dr. James and Nancy (Allison) Stuart, of Aberdeen, Scotland. Up to the age of fourteen years, he received all his instructions from his mother, an educated woman, and at that age went to New Bedford, Massachusetts, to become a drug clerk. Later he went to Boston, again working in a drug store, and spending his spare time in reading medical works with a view of entering that profession. Through the influence of Dr. Kirk, he entered Amherst Academy at Amherst, Massachusetts, and graduated from Amherst College in 1833.

== Legal career ==
After graduating he became principal of Mayville Academy at Westfield, New York. During the two years he was there he read law with Judge Osborn. In 1836 he moved to Logansport, Indiana, was admitted to the bar (February 20, 1837) and at once began the practice of this profession. He was elected prosecuting attorney of the Eighth judicial circuit in 1844 and served one term. In 1852 he was elected to the state supreme court for a term of six years over John B. Howe, but resigned, August 15, 1857, to take effect January 12, 1858, to become attorney for the Toledo & Wabash Railroad Company. In 1870 he declined a nomination to return to the state supreme court.

== Personal life and death ==
Stuart was a moderate Democrat. He married Minerva Potteo at Westfield, New York, in 1838. They had three children, Venetia, Selden P. and Frances H. His wife died in 1846 and Stuart remarried in 1849 to Sarah Scribner Benedict, of Vernon, New York. They had four sons, Charles B., Thomas A., Will V. and W. Z. His health became impaired in the spring of 1876 and, hoping to recover his health, he went to Clifton Springs, New York, where he died.

Political offices
Preceded by Thomas Smith	Justice of the Indiana Supreme Court; 1853–1858	Succeeded by James Worden
