= Edwin Hammond =

American judge (1835–1920)

Edwin Pollock Hammond (November 26, 1835 – January 27, 1920) was a justice of the Indiana Supreme Court from May 14, 1883, to January 6, 1885.

Born in Brookville, Indiana to Nathaniel and Hannah H. (Sering) Hammond, he was educated in the common schools of Brookville and Columbus, Indiana, where his family moved when he was fourteen. He was also a student in the Seminary of Columbus, Indiana. In 1854 he accepted a position in Indianapolis, but soon afterward entered the law office of his half-brother, Abram A. Hammond. In 1857, he was admitted to the senior law class at Asbury University, graduating that spring with an LL.B., and gaining admission to the bar in 1858. He moved to Rensselaer, Indiana, and opened a law office.

At the outbreak of the American Civil War, he enlisted in the 9th Indiana Infantry Regiment, and served three months, later serving as captain of the 87th Indiana Infantry Regiment, coming out of the service with the rank of lieutenant colonel. After the war he resumed his practice until 1873, when he became Judge of the Thirtieth circuit. He served in that capacity until his election to the Supreme Court of Indiana, in 1883. In his two years of service on the court, Hammond "wrote nearly two hundred opinions on issues ranging from libel, blackmail, murder, probate, and liquor sales to minors". In 1885, he left the Supreme Court to return to private practice. In 1892 he was again elected to the Circuit bench, but after two years resigned to form a partnership with Charles B. and William V. Stuart, at Lafayette, Indiana.

Hammond was also a member of the Masons and the Odd Fellows, and was a member of the Grand Army of the Republic, and a trustee of Purdue University. He married Mary V. Spiller in 1864, with whom he had three children. Hammond Died in Lafayette, Indiana.

Political offices
Preceded by William Woods	Justice of the Indiana Supreme Court; 1883–1885	Succeeded by Joseph A. S. Mitchell
