= Dixon Prentice =

American judge (1919–2014)

Associate Justice of the Indiana Supreme Court
- In office January 4, 1971 – January 6, 1986
- Preceded by: Amos W. Jackson
- Succeeded by: Brent Dickson

Personal details
- Born: June 3, 1919 Sellersburg, Indiana
- Died: July 20, 2014 (aged 95) Tucson, Arizona
- Party: Democratic

Dixon Wright Prentice (June 3, 1919 – July 20, 2014) was an American judge who served as an Associate Justice of the Indiana Supreme Court from 1971 to 1986.

Born in Sellersburg, Indiana, Prentice attended Indiana University, and received an LL.B. from the Indiana University Maurer School of Law in 1942. He served in the United States Navy during World War II, from 1942 to 1946, after which he practiced law in Sellersburg until his appointment to the Supreme Court of Indiana, in 1970.

During his tenure on the Court, he served as a commissioner of the National Conference on Uniform State Laws. He was also "one of the driving forces" behind the adoption of the "lazy judge rule", which enabled parties to seek the substitution of a judge who they considered to be too slow-acting in their case. Prentice resigned from the court in 1985, and died on July 20, 2014, in Tucson, Arizona at age 95.

Political offices
Preceded by Amos W. Jackson	Justice of the Indiana Supreme Court; 1971–1986	Succeeded by Brent E. Dickson
