= Douglas J. Morris =

American judge (1861–1928)

Justice of the Indiana Supreme Court
- In office January 2, 1911 – January 1, 1917
- Preceded by: Oscar H. Montgomery
- Succeeded by: David Myers

Douglas J. Morris (January 5, 1861 – July 9, 1928) was an American lawyer, politician, and judge who served as a justice of the Indiana Supreme Court from January 2, 1911, to January 1, 1917.

== Biography ==
Morris was born in Knightstown, Indiana to John and Hannah (née Scovell) Morris. He attended Knightstown's public schools, graduating from Knightstown High School before attending DePauw University (then called Indiana Asbury University) in Greencastle.

After graduating from DePauw in 1882 with a B.A. degree, Morris studied law in Indianapolis from 1882 to 1883 under the guidance of Benjamin Harrison, future President of the United States. Morris then went to practice law in Knoxville, Tennessee before returning to Indiana and opening up a private practice in Rushville. From 1889 to 1895, he practiced law in partnership with David S. Morgan, and then from 1895 to 1898 with S.L. Innis and Wallace Morgan.

In 1888, Morris was the Democratic candidate in a race for a seat in the U.S. Congress, but was defeated. In 1898, Morris was elected judge of the Rush County Circuit Court, serving in the position until 1904.

In 1910, Morris was elected to the Indiana Supreme Court to succeed Justice Oscar H. Montgomery. He served on the bench until 1917, when he was succeeded by Justice David Myers. He returned to his private practice in Rushville after leaving the court.

Morris married Pamela A. Spann, the daughter of a prominent Rush County politician, in 1892. They had two children, a son and a daughter. Morris's daughter, Hannah, was admitted to the Indiana bar and practiced law with her father.

Morris was a Presbyterian and a member of the Delta Kappa Epsilon fraternity.

Morris died in Rushville in 1928.

Political offices
Preceded by Oscar H. Montgomery	Justice of the Indiana Supreme Court; 1911–1917	Succeeded by David Myers
