= Charles Dewey (Indiana judge) =

American judge (1784–1862)

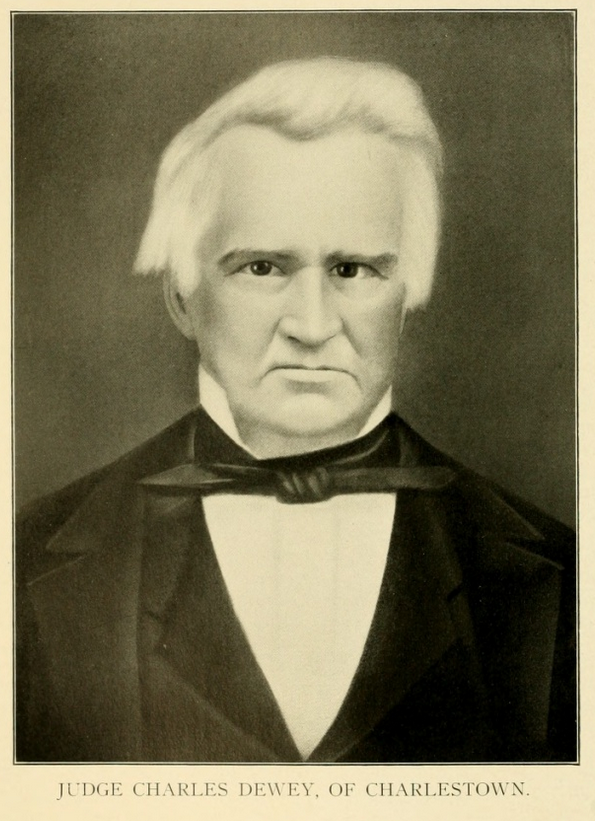

Justice of the Indiana Supreme Court
- In office May 30, 1836 – January 29, 1847
- Appointed by: Noah Noble
- Preceded by: Stephen Stevens
- Succeeded by: Thomas Smith

Personal details
- Born: March 6, 1784 Sheffield, Massachusetts
- Died: April 25, 1862 (aged 78) Charlestown, Indiana
- Resting place: Charlestown Cemetery
- Spouse: Sarah Liggett
- Relations: George Howk (son-in-law)
- Children: 5
- Education: Williams College
- Occupation: Lawyer, judge

Charles Dewey (March 6, 1784 – April 25, 1862) was a justice of the Indiana Supreme Court from May 30, 1836, to January 29, 1847.

Born in Sheffield, Massachusetts, Dewey moved to Indiana "at an early day in its history". Dewey attended Williams College, and received an honorary LL.D. from Indiana University.

He became a leading lawyer in private practice in the state prior to his appointment to the state supreme court. Following his retirement from the bench, Dewey returned to private practice, though he was not thereafter active in public affairs.

After breaking his leg in a fall in his early seventies, Dewey largely withdrew from practice. He died at his home in Charlestown, Indiana at the age of 78, following a long illness.

Political offices
| Preceded by Stephen Stevens | Justice of the Indiana Supreme Court; 1836–1847 | Succeeded by Thomas Smith |
