= Leander Monks =

American judge (1843–1919)

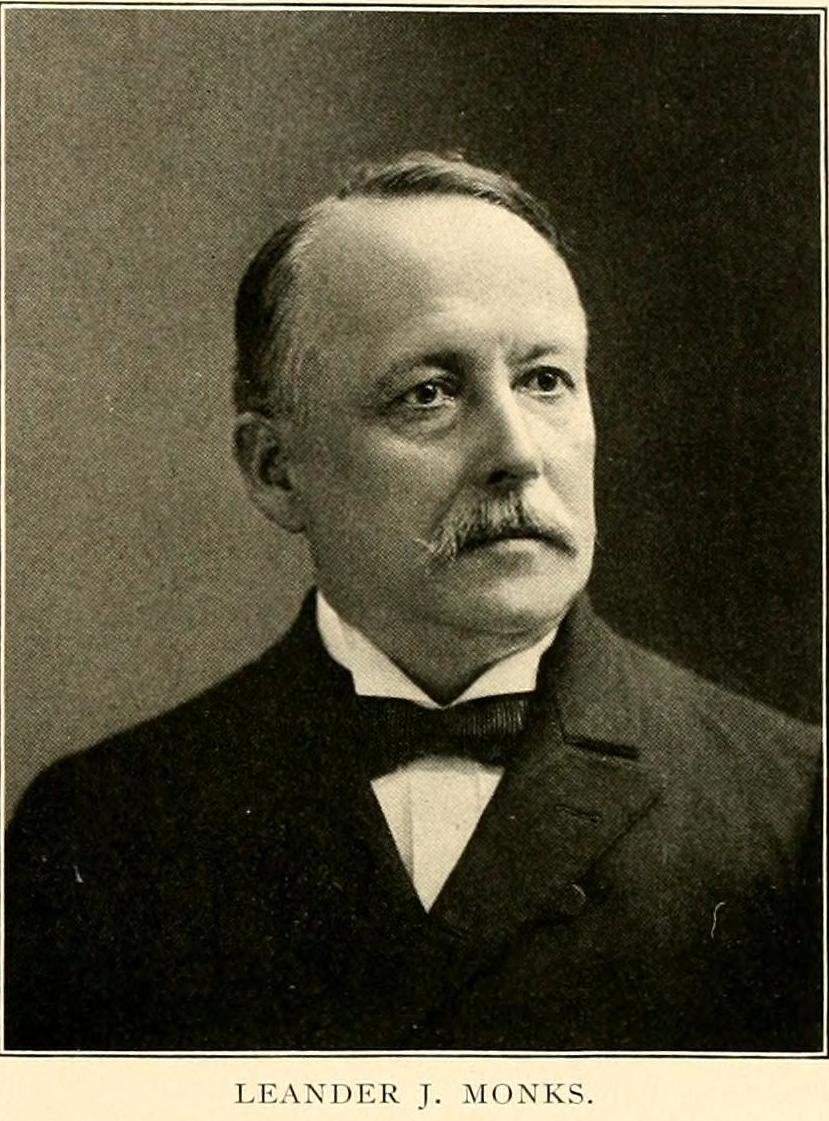
Indiana Supreme Court Justice Leander J. Monks.

Leander John Monks (July 10, 1843 – April 19, 1919) was a justice of the Indiana Supreme Court from January 7, 1895, to January 7, 1913.

== Early life and education ==
Monks was born in Winchester, Randolph County, Indiana, to George W. Monks and Mary A. Irvin. His father was twice elected county clerk, and served in the Indiana General Assembly for the 1855 session.

Monks was educated in the common schools, and attended Indiana University Bloomington from 1861 to 1863, gaining admission to the bar in Indiana in 1865, and entering the practice of law in 1866.

== Legal and political career ==
Monks practiced with various attorneys, and, developing a fondness for politics, was made county chairman of the Republican Party, serving in that capacity through the campaigns of 1870 and 1872. He became a member of the Republican State Committee and the Executive Committee in 1874. He served on these committees during the campaigns of 1874 and 1876, resigning from them to become a candidate for circuit judge in 1878.

He was elected as a circuit judge, and was twice re-elected, in 1884 and 1890. He served his first two terms as judge of the Twenty-fifth Judicial Circuit, consisting of Randolph and Delaware counties. Before the beginning of his third term the circuit was divided, and in 1890 he was elected judge of a circuit consisting of Randolph county alone. In 1894, he was elected to the Indiana Supreme Court.

Monks wrote a number of noted opinions. In Pomeroy v. Beach, he wrote an opinion construing the garnishee law of 1897 to require the filing of an affidavit in attachment before a writ of garnishment could issue. In Board of Commissioners v. Allman, he wrote an opinion overruling a large number of earlier decisions to the effect that counties are liable for injuries caused by detective bridges. In Baton v. Thomas, he wrote an opinion holding that usurious interest may be recovered back. In Louisville, N. A. & C. Railway Co. v. Bates, he wrote an opinion holding that a railroad company is bound to inspect foreign cars received from other roads in the ordinary course of business, before setting its own servants at work operating them.

In 1899, the Indiana State Bar Association's Indiana Law Journal said of Monks:

Judge Monks is very pleasant, and fond of a good joke. While his bearing is dignified, he is as approachable when holding the position of Chief Justice as he may be presumed to have been when he was a young lawyer seeking clients. As a member of the Supreme Court he is noted for the clearness and brevity of his opinions, usually contenting himself with stating the conclusion reached on a controverted point, with the reasons and authorities which support his conclusion, without entering into an extended discussion of the subject.

After leaving the bench, Monks returned to the practice of law in Indianapolis, and wrote the well-regarded book, Courts and Lawyers of Indiana. Monks died in Indianapolis.

== Personal life ==
In 1865, Monks married Lizzie W. White; they had four children.

Political offices
Preceded by Joseph S. Dailey	Justice of the Indiana Supreme Court; 1895–1913	Succeeded by Richard K. Erwin
