= David Myers (Indiana judge) =

American judge (1859–1955)

Justice of the Indiana Supreme Court
- In office January 1, 1917 – December 31, 1934
- Preceded by: Douglas J. Morris
- Succeeded by: George Tremain

David Albert Myers (August 5, 1859 – July 1, 1955) was an American lawyer, politician, and judge who served as a justice of the Indiana Supreme Court from January 1, 1917, to December 31, 1934.

== Biography ==
=== Early life and education ===
Myers was born in Cass County, Indiana near Logansport, to Henry C. Myers and Maria Myers (née Bright). Henry Myers, a prosperous farmer, was born near Hamilton, Ohio before moving with his family to Cass County in 1835. Maria Myers was a native of Virginia before moving with her family to Cass County. David Myers was the youngest of their four children.

Myers grew up on the family farm. He studied at Smithson College (in Logansport, now defunct), then at Canterbury College (in Danville, also defunct), and finally at Albany Law School of Union University (in Albany, New York). He received his law degree in 1882.

=== Legal career ===
Myers began practicing law in 1883, in Greensburg, amassing "one of the finest law libraries in the state of Indiana." In 1886, he was elected city attorney of Greensburg. From 1890 to 1892, he served as prosecuting attorney of Decatur County and Rush County. Myers was a Republican.

From 1890 to 1894, Myers served as a judge on the circuit court encompassing Decatur and Rush counties. In 1899, Myers was appointed judge of the 8th Indiana Judicial District by Governor James A. Mount, serving until 1900, when his successor was elected. In 1904, Myers was appointed a judge of the 1st district of the state appellate court, later elected to the position and serving until 1913, when he was defeated during a statewide Democratic electoral sweep.

Myers was a stockholder in the Greensburg Electric Light Company and served as director of the Greensburg National Bank when it opened in 1900.

Myers was elected Justice of the Indiana Supreme Court in 1916, succeeding Justice Douglas J. Morris. He was re-elected to the position twice, in 1922 and again in 1928. He left the court in 1934, after seventeen years. He was succeeded to the bench by George Tremain.

=== Personal life and death ===
Around 1881, Myers married Laura Hart. Hart died in 1883. Myers married again in 1907 to Margaret McNaught, daughter of the owner of a local milling company in Greensburg.

Myers was involved in numerous fraternal organizations throughout his life. He was a Scottish Rite Mason of the thirty-second degree, a Shriner, an Odd Fellow, an Elk, a member of the Knights Templar at Shelbyville, and a member of the Columbia Club.

Myers assisted in founding the Indiana State Bar Association.

Myers died in 1955 in Greensburg, at the age of 95.

Political offices
Preceded by Douglas J. Morris	Justice of the Indiana Supreme Court; 1917–1934	Succeeded by George Tremain
