= Richard K. Erwin =

American judge (1860–1917)

Richard K. Erwin (July 11, 1860 – October 5, 1917) was a justice of the Indiana Supreme Court from January 6, 1913, to October 5, 1917.

Born in Adams County, Indiana, to pioneers who had settled the area, Erwin served in the Indiana House of Representatives and was an Adams county prosecutor and a circuit court judge before being elected to the Indiana Supreme Court in 1910. He served until his death, following four weeks of hospitalization after surgery to remove gallstones.

Political offices
Preceded by Leander J. Monks	Justice of the Indiana Supreme Court; 1913–1918	Succeeded by Howard L. Townsend
