= James S. Frazer =

American judge (1824–1893)

Justice of the Indiana Supreme Court
- In office January 3, 1865 – January 3, 1871
- Preceded by: James Worden
- Succeeded by: James Worden

James Somerville Frazer (July 17, 1824 – February 20, 1893) was an American politician, lawyer, and judge who served in the Indiana House of Representatives and as a justice of the Indiana Supreme Court from January 3, 1865, to January 3, 1871. Frazer also worked for the Grant administration to help adjust claims made by various parties against the U.S. during the Civil War (most notably the Alabama Claims made by the United Kingdom). Frazer was considered by President Ulysses S. Grant as a potential nominee to the U.S. Supreme Court.

== Biography ==
=== Early life, education, and career ===
Born in Hollidaysburg, Pennsylvania to a family of Scottish descent, Frazer's mother died when he was just two years old. In 1837, Frazer moved with his father to Wayne County, Indiana. He began studying law in Winchester at the office of Moorman Way, a local judge. Frazer also taught school to help cover expenses.

After being admitted to the bar in 1845, Frazer opened a law office in Warsaw. He served in the Indiana House of Representatives from 1847 to 1848. In 1852, Frazer was elected prosecuting attorney of his local circuit court. He would return to the General Assembly for a final term in 1855, chairing the House education committee, which drafted a new education bill that allowed townships to levy taxes to pay for school buildings.

In 1855, Frazer and his family moved temporarily to Waukegan, Illinois following an outbreak of multiple diseases in Warsaw. In 1862, after the epidemic ended and the Frazers had returned to Warsaw, Frazer began a partnership with another prominent local attorney, George W. Frasier. Also in 1862, during the Civil War, the U.S. Congress passed the Revenue Act of 1862 which created what is today known as the Internal Revenue Service, an organization within the federal government responsible for collecting taxes. The legislation divided the nation into several collection districts, where matters of tax collection were to be overseen by assessors, appointed by the U.S. president. President Abraham Lincoln appointed Frazer to be the assessor of collection district that included Warsaw. Frazer held the position for less than a year before resigning, however.

=== Judicial service and later activities ===
In 1864, Frazer ran for a seat on the Indiana Supreme Court as a Republican. Indiana's 1864 elections resulted in a Republican landslide victory. The four members of the Supreme Court at that time—all Democrats—were swept out of office, replaced by Frazer and three other Republican justices (known as "the Lincoln four", consisting of Frazer, Jehu Elliott, Charles Ray, and Robert Gregory). During his time on the bench, Frazer advocated that the Court focus on the merits of a case rather than on legal technicalities. Frazer and his Republican justices also ended the Supreme Court's practice of reversing the appeals of most criminal convictions. A notable case heard by the court during Frazer's time on the bench was Smith v. Moody, in which the court struck down Article 13 of the Indiana constitution that barred African-Americans and multiracial individuals from entering or living in Indiana and also made void any contract entered into by African-Americans and multiracial individuals. The court ruled that Article 13 violated the U.S. Constitution's Privileges and Immunities Clause. Frazer left the court after a single, six-year term, refusing to seek re-nomination to his seat on the court. Frazer was succeeded to the bench by the same man he had replaced, Justice James Worden.

In 1871, President Ulysses Grant appointed Frazer to a three-person committee with the task of adjusting claims made by U.S. and U.K. citizens during the Civil War (the "Alabama Claims"). From 1873 to 1875, Frazer did similar work as an employee of the Treasury Department, tasked with adjusting claims of cotton farmers whose crops had been seized or destroyed during the war. This was the extent of Frazer's work with the federal government, but according to Donald B. Kite in Justices of the Indiana Supreme Court, President Grant "seriously considered [nominating Frazer] to the U.S. Supreme Court."

In 1879, Frazer returned to state-level politics when he was appointed head of a three-person board (also chaired by Indiana politicians David Turpie and John H. Stotsenberg) to revise and codify state statutes following the passage of legislation in the General Assembly that called for their revision. The work of the board of revision led to the implementation of the Revised Statutes of 1881 and the Revised Criminal Code and Offense Act.

In 1889, Governor Alvin P. Hovey appointed Frazer to the position of judge of the Kosciusko County Circuit Court. Frazer's decision in the notable case of State ex rel. Snoke v. Blue, School Trustee, regarding the purchase and distribution of school textbooks, was later reversed when the Indiana Supreme Court heard the case.

Also in 1889, President Benjamin Harrison (a former U.S. Senator from Indiana) suggested to his Secretary of State, James G. Blaine, that Frazer be appointed to a commission to settle an international dispute regarding U.S. claims against Venezuela. Frazer was offered the position, but declined, wishing to remain a circuit court judge.

=== Personal life and death ===
In 1848, Frazer married Caroline McLean DeFrees, a member of a prominent Indiana political family. John D. DeFrees, a newspaper magnate and superintendent of the U.S. Government Printing Office under Abraham Lincoln, and Joseph H. DeFrees, a U.S. Representative from Indiana, were both brothers-in-law to Frazer. James and Caroline Frazer were married for forty-five years and had six children together, five daughters and one son. One of their daughters, Harriet DeFrees Frazer, served as court reporter of the Kosciusko Circuit Court for forty years, with many claiming she was Indiana's first ever court reporter. Through marriage, Frazer is related to two other Indiana Supreme Court justices--Joseph Mitchell (who also married into the DeFrees family) and Francis E. Baker (Mitchell's nephew).

In 1893, Frazier died of Bright's disease at his home in Warsaw, at the age of 68, after his health had been declining for two months. He is buried in Warsaw's Oakwood Cemetery. Caroline Frazer would outlive her husband by nearly thirty years.

Political offices
Preceded by James Worden	Justice of the Indiana Supreme Court; 1865–1871	Succeeded by James Worden
