= Brent Dickson =

American judge

Chief Justice of the Indiana Supreme Court
- In office 2012–2014
- Succeeded by: Loretta Rush

Associate Justice of the Indiana Supreme Court
- In office January 6, 1986 – April 29, 2016
- Preceded by: Dixon Prentice
- Succeeded by: Geoffrey G. Slaughter

Personal details
- Born: July 18, 1941 (age 84) Hobart, Indiana, U.S.
- Education: Purdue University (BS); Indiana University (JD)

Brent Ellis Dickson (born July 18, 1941) is an American attorney and jurist who served as a justice of the Indiana Supreme Court from January 6, 1986, to April 29, 2016, and was chief justice of the Court from 2012 to 2014. He retired from the Indiana Supreme Court on April 29, 2016.

== Early life and education ==
Born in Hobart, Indiana, Dickson earned a Bachelor of Science degree from Purdue University in 1964 and a Juris Doctor from the Indiana University Robert H. McKinney School of Law in 1968. During law school, Dickson attended evening courses while working full-time as an insurance claims adjuster.

== Career ==
He practiced law in Lafayette from 1968 to 1985 and became the senior partner in the law firm of Dickson, Reiling, Teder & Withered. He was appointed by Governor Robert D. Orr to replace retiring Indiana Supreme Court Justice Dixon Prentice. The appointment began January 6, 1986, and he was retained by election in 1988.

== See also ==
- List of justices of the Indiana Supreme Court

Political offices
Preceded by Dixon Prentice	Justice of the Indiana Supreme Court; 1986–2016	Succeeded by Geoffrey G. Slaughter
