= Fred Gause =

American judge (1879–1944)

Justice of the Indiana Supreme Court
- In office November 1, 1923 – January 5, 1925
- Appointed by: Warren T. McCray
- Preceded by: Howard L. Townsend
- Succeeded by: Willard Gemmill

Personal details
- Resting place: Crown Hill Cemetery and Arboretum, Section 58, Lot 129, indianapolis, indiana

Fred Carl Gause (August 29, 1879 – February 15, 1944) was an American lawyer, politician, and judge who served as a justice of the Indiana Supreme Court from November 1, 1923, to January 5, 1925.

== Early life, education, and career ==
Gause was born in Greens Fork, Indiana to a Quaker family. Two years after he was born, his father, Dr. Thomas Gause, was murdered by Arthur Brooks after Dr. Gause told Brooks's wife that her husband was having an extramarital affair. This caused Mr. Brooks to seek revenge, entering Gause's office, threatening him, and then shooting him with a revolver. Brooks was later convicted by a jury and given a harsh sentence. The case garnered media attention across Indiana. After the murder, Fred's mother, Christine Gause (née Boone), moved her family to Henry County.

Fred Gause attended New Castle High School, graduating in 1897. Gause attended the Indiana University Maurer School of Law in Bloomington from 1898 to 1900. He was admitted to the bar the same year he graduated.

Gause returned to New Castle, where he read law under John Morris and Eugene Bundy before beginning to practice law in the city himself. Gause became the Henry County Attorney, serving in the position from 1902 to 1912.

== Judicial service and later life ==
Gause, a Republican, was elected judge of the Henry County Circuit Court, serving from 1914 to 1923. As judge, Gause approved the use of funds raised to assist American soldiers fighting in the First World War to build Henry County Memorial Park, which remains open to this day.

Gause was appointed to the Indiana Supreme Court by Governor Warren T. McCray to fill the vacancy left by the retirement of Justice Howard L. Townsend. He is remembered as a prolific opinion writer during his time on the bench. Gause wrote the opinion of the court in the case of Diamond v. Indiana, regarding the legality of the execution of an insane person (the court's decision would later be reversed by the U.S. Supreme Court decision, Panetti v. Quarterman). Gause left the bench in 1925 and was succeeded by Justice Willard Gemmill. Sources disagree about whether he chose not to run for re-election, or if he did seek re-election but was defeated.

After leaving the court, Gause returned to private practice with the firm of Pickens, Gause & Pickens in Indianapolis. Starting in 1926, Gause was a member of Indiana State Election Board, serving on the commission for many years, resigning shortly before his death. He was the President of the Indiana Bar Association in 1936 and the President of the Indianapolis Bar Association in 1941. In 1930, Gause was one of the lawyers who represented the State of Indiana in the U.S. Supreme Court case, Kentucky v. Indiana, regarding a dispute about the construction of a bridge over the Ohio River to connect Evansville and Henderson. Gause was a Methodist, a member of Beta Theta Pi, a member of the Columbia Club, and a member of the Indianapolis Chapter of the Citizens Historical Association.

== Personal life and death ==
In 1904, Gause married Mollie Cummins of Bluffton. They had one child, a daughter named Katherine.

Gause died in 1944 in Indianapolis. He is buried in Crown Hill Cemetery.

Political offices
Preceded by Howard L. Townsend	Justice of the Indiana Supreme Court; 1923–1925	Succeeded by Willard Gemmill
