= Benjamin Willoughby =

American judge (1855–1940)

Justice of the Indiana Supreme Court
- In office January 6, 1919 – January 7, 1931
- Preceded by: John W. Spencer
- Succeeded by: Walter E. Treanor

Benjamin Milton Willoughby (April 8, 1855 – June 29, 1940) was an American lawyer, politician, and judge. He served as a justice of the Indiana Supreme Court from January 6, 1919, to January 7, 1931.

== Biography ==
Willoughby was born in Ripley County, Indiana to Milton Willoughby (of English descent, originally from Pittsburgh, Pennsylvania) and Phoebe Willoughby (née Osborn, originally from Batavia, Ohio). Benjamin Willoughby was the second of their eight children.

In 1873, Willoughby moved to Trimble County, Kentucky, where he attended school. He came to Vincennes in 1875. He graduated from high school in Vincennes in 1876 and moved to Petersburg, where he became the principal of the grammar department at the local high school. In 1877, he began reading law under the tutelage of Capt. George G. Reily. From 1877 to 1878, he taught school in Sandborn. In 1878, he began studying law at Cincinnati College, graduating in 1879 and being admitted to the bar the same year.

Willoughby returned to Vincennes to practice law. In 1882, he opened a practice in partnership with Louis A. Meyer, a German immigrant, forming the firm of Meyer & Willoughby. The firm found much success, partially thanks to Meyer's ability to speak German, which attracted many clients who were German immigrants.

Willoughby was served in the Indiana House of Representatives from 1895 to 1899. Willoughy was a lifelong Republican.

In 1899, Willoughby was offered a position in the administration of William McKinley as U.S. Consul to Zanzibar, but he declined the offer.

In 1900, Willoughby became the first President of a newly formed bar association in Vincennes. Willoughby became a judge for Indiana's 12th Circuit Court in 1912, a position he held until 1918. Willoughby also served as President of the Vincennes Northern & Southern Traction Company, incorporated in 1911, which constructed railroad tracks that connected Vincennes to the rest of Knox County and Sullivan County.

Willoughby became a justice of the Indiana Supreme Court in 1919. His time on the court saw numerous challenges to Indiana's new Prohibition laws and the rise of the Ku Klux Klan's influence on Indiana politics. The KKK and the Indiana Anti-Saloon League created a powerful alliance that would target and attempt to oust elected officials in Indiana who were critical of Prohibition. Willoughby emerged as a leading critic of Prohibition and became a personal enemy of the Rev. Dr. E.S. Shumaker, superintendent of the Indiana Anti-Saloon League. Willoughby and his fellow Justices found Shumaker in contempt of court for spreading libelous information regarding the court's handling of cases regarding Prohibition law violations. The court ordered Shumaker jailed for sixty days. Governor Edward L. Jackson attempted to pardon Shumaker, but the court overturned the pardon, ruling that the Governor did not have the power to pardon those found in contempt by the Supreme Court. In 1930, Willoughby was defeated in his bid for re-election following a challenge for the Republican nomination by Thomas B. Coulter, judge of the Knox County Circuit Court. Shumaker, Anti-Saloon League, and the KKK threw their support behind Coulter, leading him to barely prevail over Willoughby in an extremely close contest, though Coulter was later defeated in the general election by Willoughby's eventual successor, Democrat Walter E. Treanor.

In 1880, Willoughby became a Scottish Rite Mason. Over his lifetime, he held various leadership positions as the Vincennes Masonic Lodge. He was twice commissioned as a Representative of the Grand Lodge of Illinois; first in 1889 and then again in 1895. He was also a Shriner and a member of the Columbia Club in Indianapolis.

In 1912, Willoughby married Edith Getches in Vincennes.

Willoughby died in 1940 in Vincennes.

Political offices
Preceded by John W. Spencer	Justice of the Indiana Supreme Court; 1919–1931	Succeeded by Walter E. Treanor
