= Loretta Rush =

American judge (born 1958)

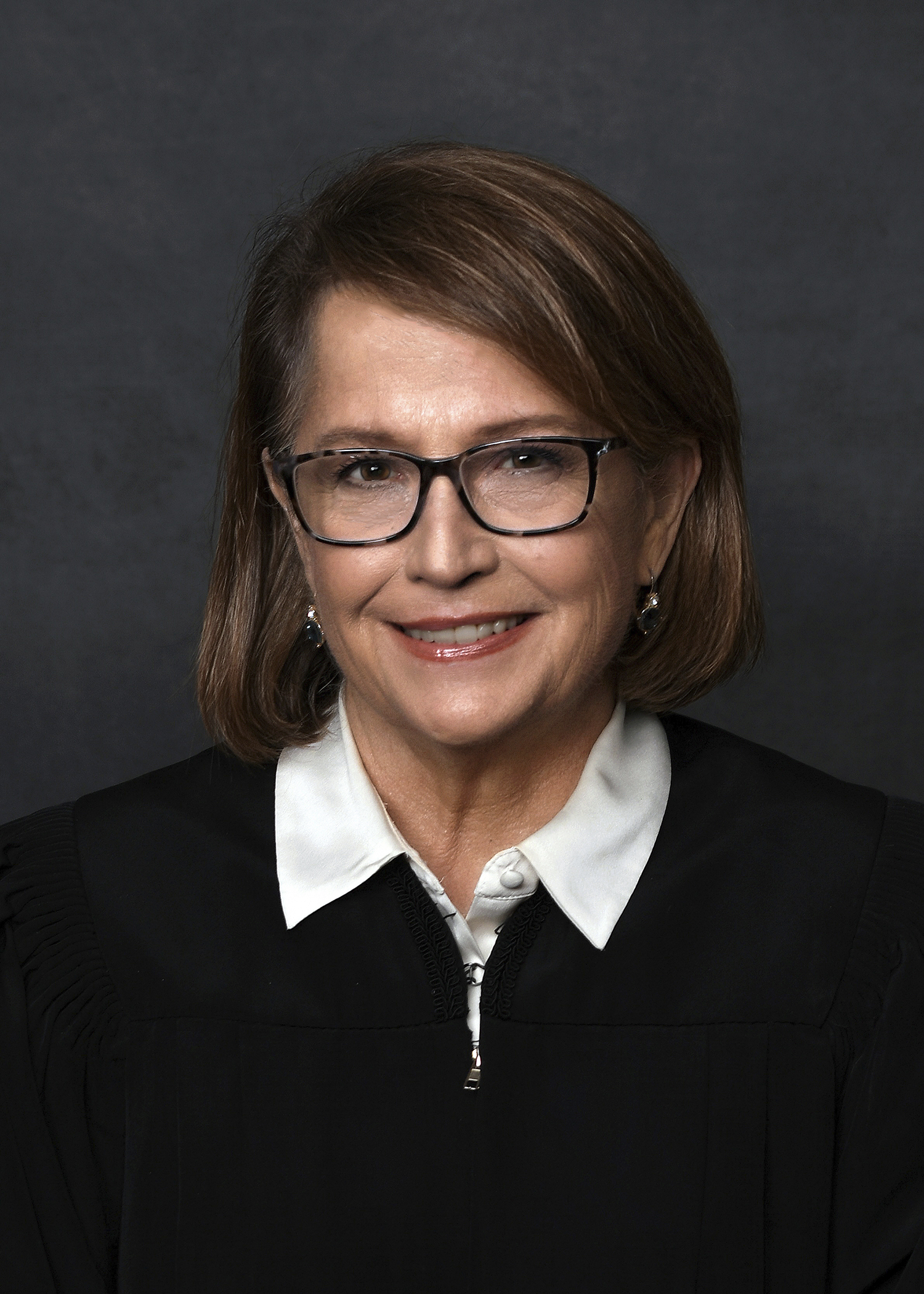

Chief Justice of the Indiana Supreme Court
- Incumbent
- Assumed office August 18, 2014
- Preceded by: Brent Dickson

Justice of the Indiana Supreme Court
- Incumbent
- Assumed office November 7, 2012
- Appointed by: Mitch Daniels
- Preceded by: Frank Sullivan Jr.

Personal details
- Born: May 11, 1958 (age 68) Scranton, Pennsylvania, U.S.
- Education: Purdue University (BA); Indiana University, Bloomington (JD)

Loretta Hogan Rush (born May 11, 1958) is an American lawyer who has served as the chief justice of the Indiana Supreme Court since 2014. She has served concurrently as an associate justice since 2012.

== Early life and education ==
Rush was born in 1958 in Scranton, Pennsylvania. She settled in Indiana in 1972. She earned an undergraduate degree from Purdue University and a Juris Doctor from the Indiana University Maurer School of Law in Bloomington, Indiana.

== Career ==
Rush spent 15 years in general practice as an associate and then partner at the Lafayette, Indiana firm of Dickson, Reiling, Teder and Withered. Her practice consisted of civil litigation, family law, business, personal injury, corporate, probate and workers compensation cases. Prior to her appointment to the Indiana Supreme Court, she was elected Tippecanoe Superior Court 3 judge and served for 14 years. As juvenile court judge in Tippecanoe County she assisted with the creation of the county's Court Appointed Special Advocate (CASA) program. She also implemented a certified juvenile drug treatment court, and initiated a twenty-four-hour assessment center for youth.

=== Indiana Supreme Court ===
Rush was appointed to the Indiana Supreme Court by Governor Mitch Daniels in September 2012. She took the oath of office as Indiana's 108th Supreme Court Justice on November 7, 2012. She became Chief Justice on August 18, 2014. She is Indiana's first female chief justice. Rush was reappointed as Chief Justice in 2019 and 2024.

She became a member of the Judicial Conference Committee on Federal-State Jurisdiction after being appointed by Chief Justice John Roberts.

Rush is a member of the Tippecanoe, Indiana, Indianapolis, Seventh Circuit and American Bar Association's Indiana and National Council of Juvenile and Family Court Judges.

=== Organizational memberships ===
In 2022, Rush became president of the Conference of Chief Justices and chair of the National Center for State Courts Board of Directors.

== Awards ==
In 2003, she was awarded the Kinsey Award for Juvenile Judge of the Year and was presented with the Fiscal Responsibility Award by the Tippecanoe County Council and Commissioners in 2001. In 2013 she was selected as one of Indianapolis Business Journal's 2013 "Women of Influence."

In 2023, she was awarded the Lady Justice Award by the National Association of Women Judges.

== See also ==
- List of justices of the Indiana Supreme Court
