= William H. Coombs =

American judge (1808–1894)

William H. Coombs (sometimes misreported as Combs; July 17, 1808 – November 28, 1894) was an American jurist, born in Brunswick, Maine, to Andrew and Susanah Coombs. In December 1811, his family moved to Cincinnati, Ohio, and the next spring established a farm 20 miles east in Clermont County, where he spent his youth. He lived in Cincinnati from 1826 to 1831 as a carpenter, settled in Connersville, Indiana, where he read law with Caleb B. Smith.

Coombs' admittance to the Indiana bar followed in Spring 1834 practicing in Connorsville for a short time with Smith before his several moves: Wabash (1835 to 1847), Fort Wayne (1847 to 1840), and California via Cape Horn. The later he would call home, practice law and farm until 1855, returning to Fort Wayne. He would retire from law in 1866 until on December 2, 1882, Governor Albert G. Porter temporarily appointed him to the vacated seat in the Indiana Supreme Court of James Worden. He sat for one month until a successor was qualified on January 1, 1883.

Coombs married Jane Adsall of Ohio on May 25, 1837. They had eleven children, three of whom survived him when he died at home after several months of declining health.

Political offices
Preceded by James Worden	Justice of the Indiana Supreme Court; 1882–1883	Succeeded by Allen Zollars
