= Thomas Smith (Indiana judge) =

American judge (1805–1875)

Thomas L. Smith

Justice of the Indiana Supreme Court
- In office January 29, 1847 – January 3, 1853
- Nominated by: James Whitcomb
- Preceded by: Charles Dewey
- Succeeded by: William Z. Stuart

Personal details
- Born: March 23, 1805

Thomas Lacey Smith (March 23, 1805 – January 1875) was an American surgeon, writer, lawyer, politician, and judge who served as a justice of the Indiana Supreme Court from January 29, 1847, to January 3, 1853.

== Biography ==
=== Early life, education, and travels ===
Born in Philadelphia, Pennsylvania, Smith grew up in the city and attended the University of Pennsylvania. After obtaining his medical degree, Smith was hired as a surgeon on a merchant vessel that traveled to trade in several East Asian ports. It was because of this job that Smith spent nearly ten years in China and learned to speak Chinese.

Shortly after medical school, Smith (under the pen name "Jeremy Peters") published The Chronicles of Turkeytown, a satirical novel about rural America.

After returning to Pennsylvania from China, Smith established a medical practice in Chester County and married a local woman. During this time, he also served in the Pennsylvania General Assembly.

Smith eventually abandoned his medical career and left Chester County, moving to Louisville, Kentucky, where he was part owner and (for a brief time) editor in chief of a local newspaper, the Louisville Weekly Democrat.

Smith moved again in 1845 to New Albany, Indiana, where he would live for the rest of his life. In New Albany, Smith began to practice law. A member of the Democratic Party, Smith made connections with other prominent Democrats living in New Albany, including future Governor Ashbel P. Willard and future U.S. Speaker of the House Michael C. Kerr. In 1843, Smith ran for election to the Indiana Senate but lost.

=== Judicial career ===
After taking office, Democratic Governor James Whitcomb sought to replace the two Whig justices of the Indiana Supreme Court--Charles Dewey and Jeremiah Sullivan—with Democrats. Whitcomb nominated Smith to the Supreme Court. The state senate voted against confirming him three separate times until he was finally confirmed by a narrow, one-vote margin on the fourth attempt. Smith became a justice of the Indiana Supreme Court on January 29, 1847, succeeding Justice Dewey. Smith would author over two hundred opinions during his time on the court. Most notably, Smith would author the court's majority opinion during a case involving a land dispute between the state and Vincennes University. Smith and his fellow Justices ruled in favor of the state, but the Supreme Court of the United States would eventually overturn this ruling. After nearly six years, Smith retired from the court on January 3, 1853. He was succeeded by Justice William Z. Stuart.

After leaving the court, Smith returned to his law practice in New Albany. He also authored and published a school textbook, Elements of the Law. Additionally, Smith remained active in Indiana politics as a lobbyist. Smith drafted legislation to charter a new state bank and worked tirelessly to get lawmakers to support the effort. In 1855, after a long, bitter fight, the Indiana General Assembly voted to charter the bank, overriding a veto by Governor Joseph A. Wright. After the bank opened, Smith was provided with subscription rights to stock in the bank, along with stock in several of the bank's different branches. Smith was also appointed to a board that decided where branches of the bank would be opened. Due the generosity of these gifts from the bank he helped to found, Smith was subsequently investigated by the state senate for graft and corruption, though he never faced any punitive actions as a result of this investigation.

During the Civil War, Smith was a War Democrat, part of the wing of the Democratic Party that supported the Union during the conflict. Smith wrote the lyrics for a pro-Union song called "The Union Soldier's Hymn", composed by Augustus Paulsen. In 1862, Smith presented a resolution of Union Democrats calling for the U.S. to "utterly crush out the present unnatural and causeless rebellion", while protecting citizens of the rebellious states who remained loyal to the U.S.

Political offices
Preceded by Charles Dewey	Justice of the Indiana Supreme Court; 1847–1853	Succeeded by William Z. Stuart
