= John Miller (Indiana judge) =

American judge (1840–1898)

Justice of the Indiana Supreme Court
- In office February 25, 1891 – January 2, 1893
- Appointed by: Alvin Peterson Hovey
- Preceded by: John Berkshire
- Succeeded by: Leonard Hackney

John Donnell Miller (December 2, 1840 – March 18, 1898) was an American lawyer, politician, and judge who served as a justice of the Indiana Supreme Court from February 25, 1891, to January 2, 1893.

== Biography ==
John Miller was born in Clarksburg, Indiana to George Miller (originally from Western Virginia) and Margaret Jane Miller (née Donnell, born near Kingston, Indiana).

In 1859, Miller began attending Hanover College, but left school in 1861 to enlist following the outbreak of the Civil War. Part of Company G of the 7th Indiana Infantry Regiment, which was sent to fight in Virginia and West Virginia. Miller reportedly served in twenty battles as a private (including many famous battles such as the Second Battle of Bull Run, Antietam, Fredericksburg, Chancellorsville, the Battle of the Wilderness, and Gettysburg) and (from 1862 to 1864) as a clerk to an adjutant.

After the end of the war, Miller studied law at the firm of Overstreet & Hunter in Franklin. He was admitted to the bar in 1866 and moved to Greensburg. From 1868 to 1873, he ran a private law practice in Greensburg in partnership with Colonel Frank E. Gavin. Miller served as Greensburg's City Clerk from 1866 to 1867 and City Attorney in 1871. In 1872, Miller was elected to represent Decatur and Rush counties in the General Assembly. Miller was a Republican.

After the death of Indiana Supreme Court Justice John Berkshire in 1891, Governor Alvin Peterson Hovey appointed Miller to fill his now vacant seat on the bench. Miller wrote 136 opinions during his time on the bench, writing on a variety of cases; land disputes, debt collection, employer liability, and women's rights under the law (for example, Miller wrote the court's opinion on cases involving dower portions and coverture). Miller sought re-election to the court in 1892, but was defeated and succeeded by Justice Leonard Hackney. Miller returned to Greensburg to practice law.

Miller married Mary Jane Stevens in Greensburg in 1869. Mary died in 1891. They had three children together, all daughters.

In 1894, he would be elected judge of Indiana's 8th Circuit Court, a position he would hold until he died in 1898.

Political offices
Preceded by John Berkshire	Justice of the Indiana Supreme Court; 1891–1893	Succeeded by Leonard Hackney
