= Oscar H. Montgomery =

American judge (1859–1936)

Justice of the Indiana Supreme Court
- In office January 2, 1905 – January 2, 1911
- Preceded by: Alexander Dowling
- Succeeded by: Douglas J. Morris

Oscar Hilton Montgomery (April 27, 1859 – May 5, 1936) was an American lawyer, politician, and judge who served as a justice of the Indiana Supreme Court from January 2, 1905, to January 2, 1911.

== Biography ==
Montgomery was born on a farm near Seymour, Indiana. Montgomery's father, Theophilus Wylie Montgomery, was of Scottish descent and his mother, Susan Harriet Montgomery, was from New York.

Montgomery grew up on the family farm and was educated at local public schools before leaving to attend Hanover College, where he was part of the Sigma Chi fraternity. Graduating in 1881 from Hanover's classical studies department, Montgomery became a school teacher in Reddington while he began studying law. In 1884, he was admitted to the Indiana bar. He moved to Greenfield shortly before returning to his boyhood home of Seymour.

Back in Seymour, Montgomery opened up a private law practice and became involved in local politics as a Republican. In 1892, he was elected to serve on the Jackson county council. In 1896, he served as a delegate from Indiana to the 1896 Republican National Convention in St. Louis, Missouri. Montgomery served for ten years as Seymour's city attorney. He was also active in numerous local fraternal organizations, namely the Knights of Pythias and the Masonic Order, and was also a member of the private Columbia Club in Indianapolis. Montgomery was on the board of trustees for Hanover College and the First National Bank of Seymour. He presided over a state Committee on Uniform State Laws.

In 1904, Montgomery was elected to the Indiana Supreme Court to succeed Justice Alexander Dowling. He was succeeded to the court in 1911 by Justice Douglas J. Morris.

In 1886, Montgomery married Ida E. Harding and had four children. One of them, Theophilus Harlan Montgomery, was a Princeton University graduate and practiced law with his father in Seymour.

Montgomery died in Seymour in 1936, at the age of 77.

Political offices
Preceded by Alexander Dowling	Justice of the Indiana Supreme Court; 1905–1911	Succeeded by Douglas J. Morris
