= James Jordan (Indiana judge) =

American judge (1842–1912)

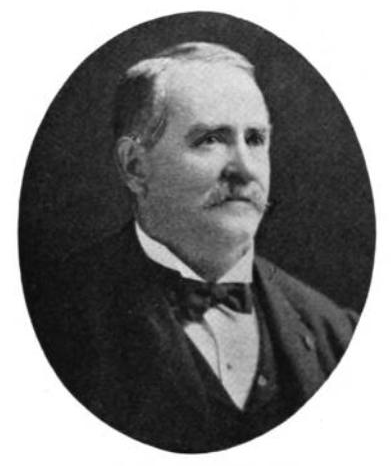

Justice of the Indiana Supreme Court
- In office January 7, 1895 – April 5, 1912

Personal details
- Born: James Henry Jordan; December 21, 1842; Woodstock, Virginia
- Died: April 5, 1912 (aged 69); Martinsville, Indiana
- Political party: Republican
- Education: Indiana University School of Law – Bloomington
- Occupation: Judge

James Henry Jordan (December 21, 1842 – April 5, 1912) was a justice of the Indiana Supreme Court from January 7, 1895, to April 5, 1912.

== Biography ==
Born in Woodstock, Virginia, Jordan came to Indiana in 1853 with his parents, who settled near Corydon, Indiana, where he lived until the outbreak of the American Civil War. He then enlisted in the Indiana legion and served for three years with the Forty-fifth Regiment, Indiana Volunteers, the Third Cavalry, participating in seventy-six engagements and got wounded twice. At the close of the war, he was promoted to the rank of lieutenant colonel. On returning from the war he attended Wabash College, but left there and received his B.A. from Indiana University in 1868, and also read law with Judges William A. Porter and Thomas C. Slaughter to gain admission to the Indiana bar in 1868. He re-entered Indiana University and received an LL.B. from the Indiana University School of Law – Bloomington in 1871.

He was admitted to the bar at Corydon in 1871. He moved to Clinton, Missouri, but returned to Indiana and settled at Martinsville, Indiana. In 1872 he was appointed district attorney of the Common Pleas court and served until this court was abolished in 1873. He was then elected city attorney of Martinsville, serving in this capacity for twelve years. He was selected as one of three Republican candidates for the Supreme Court from the First District in the state convention of August 8, 1888, but his candidacy was unsuccessful. He was elected in 1894 and served until his death, in Martinsville, Indiana.

He was a member of the Grand Army of the Republic, and served as a trustee of Indiana University for a number of years. Jordan died in his home in Martinsville following five months of illness with Bright's disease.

Political offices
Preceded by Silas Coffey	Justice of the Indiana Supreme Court; 1895–1912	Succeeded by John W. Spencer
