= Horace P. Biddle =

American judge (1811–1900)

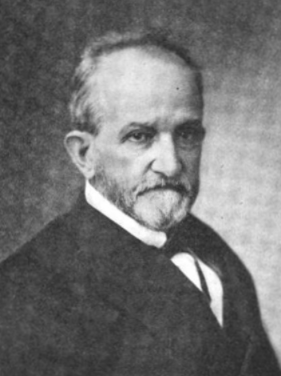

Justice of the Indiana Supreme Court
- In office 1875–1881

Personal details
- Born: Horace Peters Biddle; March 24, 1811 Hocking County, Ohio, U.S.
- Died: May 13, 1900 (aged 89) Logansport, Indiana, U.S.
- Party: Whig; Republican
- Spouses: Elema Ward (m. 1832; died 1834) Anna Maria Matlack (m. 1846)
- Occupation: Jurist, writer

Horace Peters Biddle (March 24, 1811 – May 13, 1900) was a lawyer, judge, poet, musicologist, and famous hermit.

== Biography ==
Horace P. Biddle was born on what was then the frontier in present-day Hocking County, Ohio on March 24, 1811. He was the youngest of nine children and was largely raised by his oldest sister after the death of his mother when Biddle was five. After working for seven years for his brother Daniel, a store owner, he caught the attention of lawyer and future Ohio Senator Thomas Ewing who advised him to study law and found a place for him in the office of Hocking H. Hunter. After being admitted to the Ohio Bar in 1839, Biddle moved to Logansport, Indiana and opened a practice there. From 1847 to 1852 he served as the presiding judge of the Carroll County circuit. In 1850 he was a member of the state constitutional convention. In 1852 he resigned from the circuit court and ran for United States Representative on the Whig Party ticket but was unsuccessful. He was elected as a Republican to the Indiana Supreme Court in 1857, but the court decided that the vacancy, created by a resignation, could be filled by the governor by appointment. He was nominated again for the position in 1858, but was not elected. Biddle instead served two 6-year terms as Carroll County circuit court judge (1860–1872). In 1872 Biddle was nominated for a Congressional seat by the Democratic and Independent Reform conventions, but declined the nomination and endorsed Ulysses S. Grant's re-election. In 1874 he was nominated by the Democratic and Independent Reform slates for Supreme Court justice and was elected; he served from January 1875 to January 1881.

Biddle was also a poet who published a number of works; his work was praised by Washington Irving and others. He published several works on literary theory, including The Definition of Poetry (1873) and The Analysis of Rhyme (1876). He translated a number of works (The Swallow by Lamartine, for example) and published a book on Russian literature. He published several works on sound and music theory, including The Musical Scale (1860), a Review of Tyndall on Sound (1872), and a pamphlet describing an instrument of his invention called the tetrachord.

In his last years Biddle became rather reclusive, rarely leaving his home in Logansport, which was on a 17-acre island in the Wabash River known as Biddle Island. He died there on May 13, 1900. His will was not found until six months later; his estate, including a 9,000 volume library and the 17 acre island property, went largely to his niece Eva Peters Reynolds.

Biddle married Elema Ward on April 19, 1832; she died June 12, 1834. They had one child, who died as an infant. Biddle married Anna Maria Matlack (1824?-1900) on June 8, 1846; after 1847 they separated, although they never divorced.

Political offices
Preceded by Andrew L. Osborn	Justice of the Indiana Supreme Court; 1875–1881	Succeeded by William A. Woods
