= Robert D. Rucker =

American judge

Indiana Supreme Court Justice
- In office November 19, 1999 – May 12, 2017
- Appointed by: Frank O'Bannon
- Preceded by: Myra Selby
- Succeeded by: Christopher M. Goff

Personal details
- Born: 1947 (age 78–79) Canton, Georgia
- Party: Democratic Party
- Spouse: Denise Rucker
- Education: Indiana University Northwest; Valparaiso University School of Law
- Occupation: Lawyer

Military service
- Branch/service: United States Army
- Battles/wars: Vietnam War

Robert D. Rucker (born 1947) was the 105th justice appointed to the Indiana Supreme Court. He retired May 12, 2017.

Born in Canton, Georgia, Rucker grew up in Gary, Indiana. He joined the army and served in the 1st Cavalry Division during the Vietnam War, where he earned the Bronze Star Medal and the Purple Heart.

He is a graduate of Indiana University Northwest (B.A. 1974) and Valparaiso University School of Law (J.D. 1976). He earned a Master of Laws degree in the judicial process from the University of Virginia Law School in 1998.

Justice Rucker served as a Judge on the Indiana Court of Appeals, having been appointed to that position in 1991 by Indiana Governor Evan Bayh. He was the first African American to serve on the Indiana Court of Appeals and thus making him the first African American appellate judge in the State of Indiana. While on the Court of Appeals, Justice Rucker served as vice-chair of the Indiana Commission for Continuing Legal Education.

As a lawyer, Justice Rucker served on the board of directors of the Indiana Trial Lawyers Association and on the board of directors of the Northwest Indiana Legal Services Organization. He also served as a deputy prosecuting attorney for Lake County, Indiana, City Attorney for the City of Gary, and practiced general law in East Chicago, Indiana.

Justice Rucker was appointed to the Indiana Supreme Court by Governor Frank O'Bannon in 1999. He is the second African American to serve on the Supreme Court of Indiana, succeeding Myra Selby, the first African American, and the first woman to ever serve on the Supreme Court of Indiana. Justice Rucker is the only Court of Appeals judge to ever be elevated to the Supreme Court. Since his appointment to the Supreme Court in 1999 he has served on the longest continuous group of justices to serve together in the Court's long and distinguished history, ten years and counting. Justice Rucker has authored over 450 majority opinions and issued over 100 dissents during his tenure on both the Court of Appeals and the Supreme Court.

His published writings include, The Right to Ignore the Law: Constitutional Entitlement Versus Judicial Interpretation, 33 Val. U. L. Rev. 449 (Spring 1999).

Justice Rucker has been a pioneer in many areas including his dedication to increasing diversity in the legal profession. He has done this in many ways including appointing women and lawyers of color to serve on various Supreme Court boards and commissions and consistently hiring lawyers of color to serve as his law clerks on the Court of Appeals and the Supreme Court.

The Lake County (Indiana) Commissioners have recently renamed the Lake County courthouse in downtown Gary, Indiana after Justice Rucker. The courthouse is home to several Lake County Superior Courts. Commissioner Roosevelt Allen said the February 17, 2010 vote to rename the courthouse, "Was a vote in recognition of the distinguished, exemplary career of Justice Rucker. Black male role models such as President Obama and Justice Robert Rucker will inspire countless numbers of black males, both nationally and within our community, to aspire to greatness and help our nation to remain the pre-eminent country in the world."

Justice Rucker is a member of the American Bar Association, the Indiana Judges Association, the Indiana State Bar Association, the Marion County Bar Association, and is a Fellow of the Indianapolis Bar Foundation. He is the chair of the Lake County Judicial Nominating Commission. He also serves as the current chair of the National Bar Association's Judicial Council. Justice Rucker has received numerous awards throughout his career for his service and dedication to the bench and the bar, including the outstanding alumni achievement award from Valparaiso University School of Law.

Justice Rucker is the father of three children: James, Dawn and Fanon. Fanon A. Rucker is a Judge on the Hamilton County Municipal Court in Cincinnati, Ohio. Justice Rucker and Judge Rucker were recently honored as the first African-American father/son Justice/Judge combination in known American History.

== Indiana Supreme Court judge ==
=== Notable opinions ===
- Wrinkles v. Indiana, 749 N.E.2d 1179 (Ind. 2002)(prohibited use of stun belt on defendant in courtroom)
- Saylor v. Indiana, 765 N.E.2d 535 (Ind. 2002)(Indiana death penalty statute did not permit judges to unconstitutionally increase sentence beyond statutory maximum)
- Indiana v. Quirk, 842 N.E.2d 334 (Ind. 2007)
- Anglemyer v. State, 868 N.E.2d 482 (Ind. 2007) as corrected on rehearing by 875 N.E.2d 218 (Ind. 2007)
- Indiana v. Davis, 898 N.E.2d 281 (Ind. 2008)
- Wallace v. State, 905 N.E.2d 371 (Ind. 2009)
- Myers v. Leedy, 915 N.E.2d 133 (Ind. 2009).
- A Dissenting opinion "Barnes v. Indiana", 82S05-1007-CR-343 (Ind. 2011) arguing that individuals have a right to defend their homes from unlawful entry by government agents.

== See also ==
- List of African-American jurists
- List of first minority male lawyers and judges in Illinois
