= Robert McBride (Indiana judge) =

American judge (1842–1926)

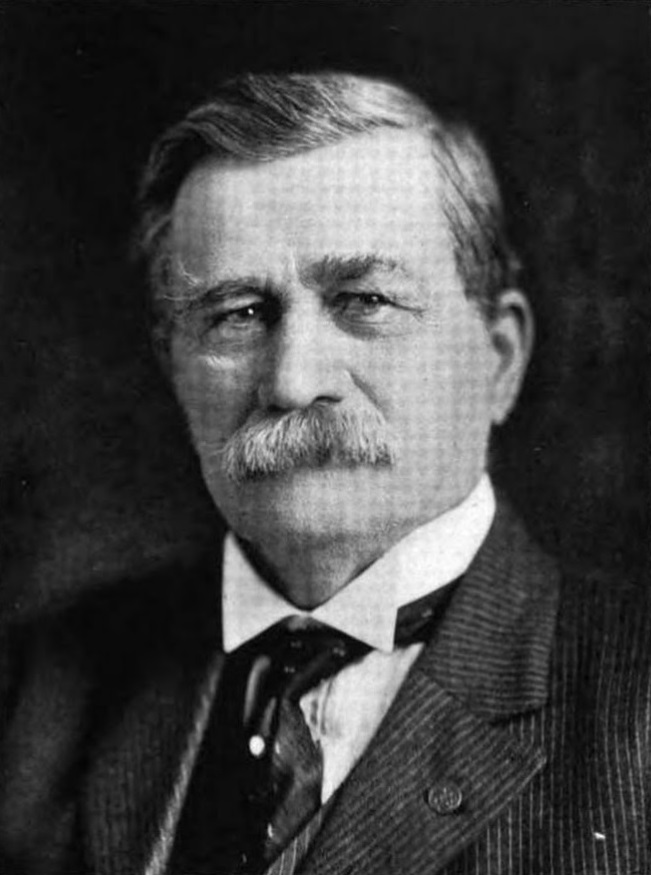
Indiana Supreme Court Justice Robert McBride.

Robert Wesley McBride (January 25, 1842 – May 15, 1926) was a justice of the Indiana Supreme Court from December 17, 1890, to January 2, 1893.

Born in Richland County, Ohio, to Augustus and Martha A. (Barnes) McBride, he was six years old when his father died, and at the age of thirteen he accompanied an uncle to Mahaska County, Iowa, his education principally being obtained in the common schools of Ohio and Iowa. He taught in Iowa for three years and then returned to Ohio. In 1863 he enlisted in the volunteer service, in Ohio. His company was composed of men selected to serve as bodyguards for President Abraham Lincoln, but it was for a while assigned to other duty in Washington, D.C. McBride served a bodyguard for Lincoln for about six months in 1863, during which time McBride was permanently injured so as to make him unfit for active duty. In January 1865, he was transferred to the War Department at Washington, D.C., where he served until September 1865.

After the war he taught school, and worked as a clerk in the Indiana Senate, while reading law. In April 1867, when he was admitted to the bar at Auburn, Indiana. He had excellent success at the bar. He settled in Waterloo, Indiana in 1866, and was a partner of James I. Best, and later of Joseph L. Morlan. In 1882 he was elected circuit judge of the Thirty-fifth circuit. In June 1890, McBride moved to Elkhart, Indiana, and later that year was nominated by the Republican party for the office of judge of the Supreme Court, but was defeated with his party, with opponent Joseph Mitchell winning the seat in November 1890. Mitchell, however, died less than a month later, and McBride was appointed to the seat on December 17, 1890. He served on the court until January 2, 1893, thereafter returning to private practice. In 1893, he formed a partnership with Caleb S. Denny in Indianapolis, which lasted until 1904, after which McBride practiced alone. He also served for a time as president of the Indiana State Bar Association, and continued the practice of law until his death.

Political offices
Preceded by Joseph Mitchell	Justice of the Indiana Supreme Court; 1890–1893	Succeeded by Timothy Edward Howard
