= Geoffrey G. Slaughter =

American judge (born 1962)

Geoffrey Slaughter
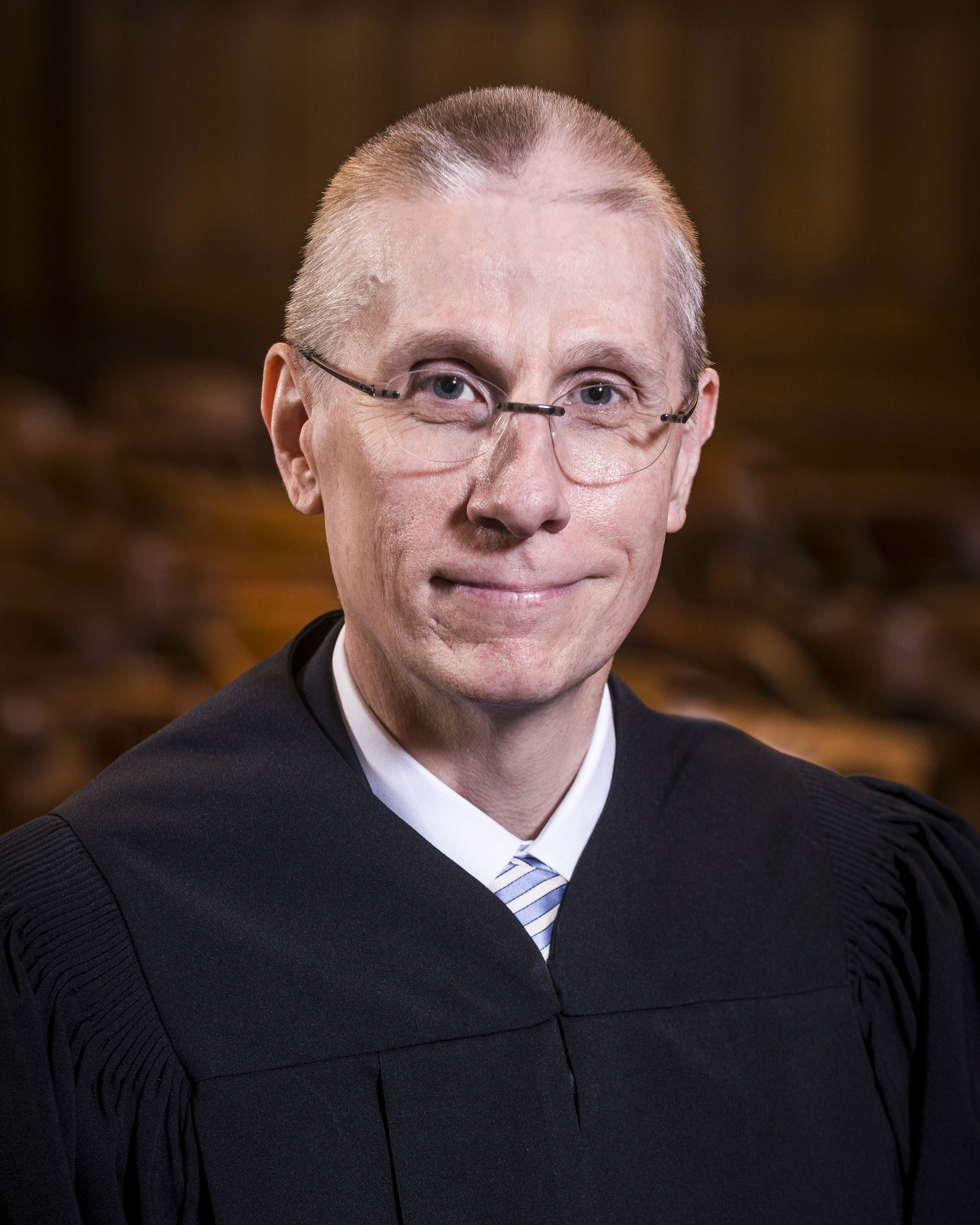

Associate Justice of the Indiana Supreme Court
- Incumbent
- Assumed office May 9, 2016
- Appointed by: Mike Pence
- Preceded by: Brent Dickson

Personal details
- Born: November 1, 1962 (age 62); Gary, Indiana, U.S.
- Education: Indiana University, Bloomington (BA, JD, MBA)

Geoffrey G. Slaughter (born November 1, 1962) is an associate justice of the Indiana Supreme Court. He was appointed by Governor Mike Pence in May 2016.

== Early life and education ==
Born in Gary, Indiana, Slaughter was raised in Crown Point, graduating from high school there in 1981. He received a Bachelor of Arts in economics with high honors from Indiana University Bloomington in 1985, followed by a Master of Business Administration in finance from the Kelley School of Business in 1989 and a Juris Doctor, cum laude, from the Indiana University Maurer School of Law in 1989.

== Legal career ==
Slaughter was then a law clerk to the Honorable Allen Sharp of the United States District Court for the Northern District of Indiana, stationed in South Bend. Slaughter entered private practice in Chicago, with the firm of Kirkland & Ellis, until 1995, when he became a special counsel to the Indiana Attorney General. He returned to private practice in 2001, in Indianapolis, as a partner with Taft Stettinius & Hollister, a position he held until his appointment to the Indiana Supreme Court.

Legal offices
Preceded by Brent Dickson	Associate Justice of the Indiana Supreme Court; 2016–present	Incumbent
