= Alfred Pivarnik =

American judge (1925–1995)

Alfred J. Pivarnik (January 20, 1925 – June 3, 1995) was a justice of the Indiana Supreme Court from May 13, 1977, to December 14, 1990.

Born in Valparaiso, Indiana, Pivarnik served in the United States Army Air Force during World War II, as a radio operator and gunner on a B-17 Flying Fortress, and then attended Creighton University, and received his law degree from Valparaiso University School of Law in 1951. He then established a law practice in Valparaiso. Pivarnik served three terms as a circuit judge, from 1962 to 1977, prior to his appointment to the state supreme court by Governor Otis R. Bowen. He was the first justice to be appointed to the high court through a newly established nonpolitical merit system.

In 1988, Pavarnik accused then-Chief Justice Randall T. Shepard of having abused alcohol and drugs and of "making improper advances toward men" earlier in Shepherd's career. He further questioned the thoroughness of the investigation conducted by the judicial nominating officials who vetted Shepherd. Pivarnik also aggressively pursued defamation lawsuits against people who accused him of corruption, winning a settlement in one such case in 1979. Pivarnik retired from the court due to a diagnosis of liver cancer.

Political offices
Preceded by Norman Arterburn	Justice of the Indiana Supreme Court; 1977–1990	Succeeded by Jon Krahulik
