= Christopher M. Goff =

American judge (born 1972)

Christopher Goff
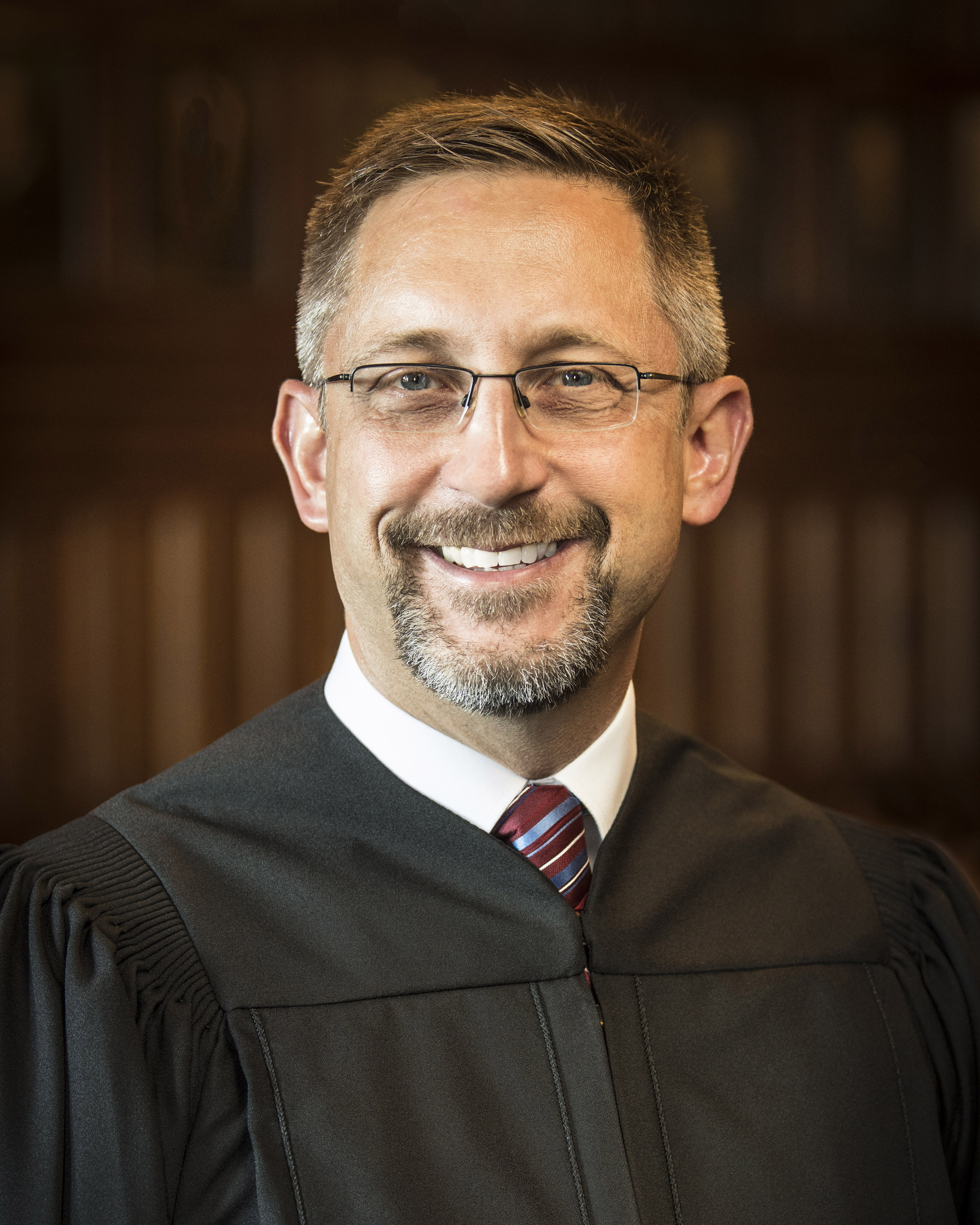

Associate Justice of the Indiana Supreme Court
- Incumbent
- Assumed office July 24, 2017
- Appointed by: Eric Holcomb
- Preceded by: Robert D. Rucker

Personal details
- Born: 1972 (age 53–54) Wabash County, Indiana, U.S.
- Spouse: Raquel
- Children: 4
- Education: Ball State University (BA); Indiana University, Bloomington (JD)

Christopher M. Goff (born 1972) is an American lawyer who has served a justice of the Indiana Supreme Court since 2017.

== Biography ==
Goff was born in 1972 and raised in Wabash, Indiana. He received his undergraduate degree from Ball State University in 1994 and his Juris Doctor from Indiana University Maurer School of Law in 1996. Upon graduation from law school he was a partner at Mills, Northrop & Goff in Huntington, Indiana.

== Judicial career ==
=== Superior court service ===
Goff served as a judge on the Wabash County Superior Court from 2005 until his appointment to the Supreme Court. During his tenure on the superior court he established the Wabash County Drug Court and the Wabash County Family Drug Treatment Court.

=== Supreme Court of Indiana ===
Goff was one of three candidates for a seat on the Supreme Court of Indiana, after the retirement of Robert D. Rucker. On June 12, 2017, Governor Eric Holcomb selected him to be the next appointment to the Supreme Court. He was officially sworn in on July 24, 2017.

== Personal life ==
Goff and his wife, Raquel, have four children.

Legal offices
Preceded by Robert D. Rucker	Associate Justice of the Indiana Supreme Court; 2017–present	Incumbent
