= Curtis Roll =

American judge (1884–1970)

Curtis William Roll (August 29, 1884 – November 8, 1970) was a justice of the Indiana Supreme Court from January 5, 1931, to January 4, 1943. He was a Democrat.

Born in Fredericksburg, Washington County, Indiana, Roll received an A.B. from Indiana University in 1909, followed by an LL.B. from the Indiana University Maurer School of Law in 1912. He served as the county attorney for Howard County, Indiana from 1913 to 1914, and a prosecutor in Kokomo, Indiana, from 1912 to 1931. He was elected to the Indiana Supreme Court in the Democratic wave of 1930. Roll authored two important opinions with "noted political repercussions", one denying a recount to 1938 U.S. Senate candidate Raymond E. Willis, and the other striking down a 1941 legislative effort to diminish the powers of Governor Henry F. Schricker. Roll declined to seek re-election in 1942.

Before and after his service on the Supreme Court of Indiana he engaged in private law practice. He is buried in Paoli, Orange County, Indiana.

Political offices
Preceded by Willard G. Gemmill	Justice of the Indiana Supreme Court; 1931-1943	Succeeded by Martin J. O'Malley
