= John Berkshire =

American judge (1832–1891)

John Griffith Berkshire (1832 – February 19, 1891) was a justice of the Indiana Supreme Court from January 17, 1889, to February 19, 1891.

== Early life and education ==
Born in Ohio County, Indiana, during early life Berkshire learned the trade and worked at blacksmithing with his father. In the late 1850s he began the study of law at Versailles, Ohio, and then at Indiana Asbury University (which later became DePauw University), and later was admitted to practice.

In 1864 he was the Republican candidate for judge of the Circuit Court, and was elected. He was re-elected to the same position in 1870, and again in 1876. He was a candidate for the Supreme Court judgeship in 1883, but the opposing party had the State in the election that year. In 1888 he was again a candidate, and was successful. He had been a resident of North Vernon for the past fourteen years, and was held in high esteem. He served until his death, after which Governor Hovey appointed a successor to serve until the next general election.

Berkshire died at his home in North Vernon at 6 o'clock on a Thursday evening. He had been in poor health for a year or more but his last sickness only lasted a few days before his death from pneumonia.

Political offices
| Preceded by George Howk | Justice of the Indiana Supreme Court; 1889–1891 | Succeeded by John Miller |
