= Justice Elliott =

Justice Elliott may refer to:

- Byron Elliott (1835–1913), associate justice of the Indiana Supreme Court
- Charles B. Elliott (1861–1935), associate justice of the Minnesota Supreme Court
- Jehu Elliott (1813–1876), associate justice of the Indiana Supreme Court
- Victor A. Elliott (1839–1899), associate justice of the Colorado Supreme Court

== See also ==
- Judge Elliott (disambiguation)
- Justice Ellett (disambiguation)
