= Justice Hanna =

Justice Hanna may refer to:

- James Hanna (judge) (1816–1872), associate justice of the Indiana Supreme Court
- Richard H. Hanna (1879–1946), associate justice of the New Mexico Supreme Court

== See also ==
- Jim Hannah (1944–2016), associate justice of the Arkansas Supreme Court
