= Hartford City Courthouse Square Historic District =

Historic district in Indiana, United States

- U.S. National Register of Historic Places
- U.S. Historic district
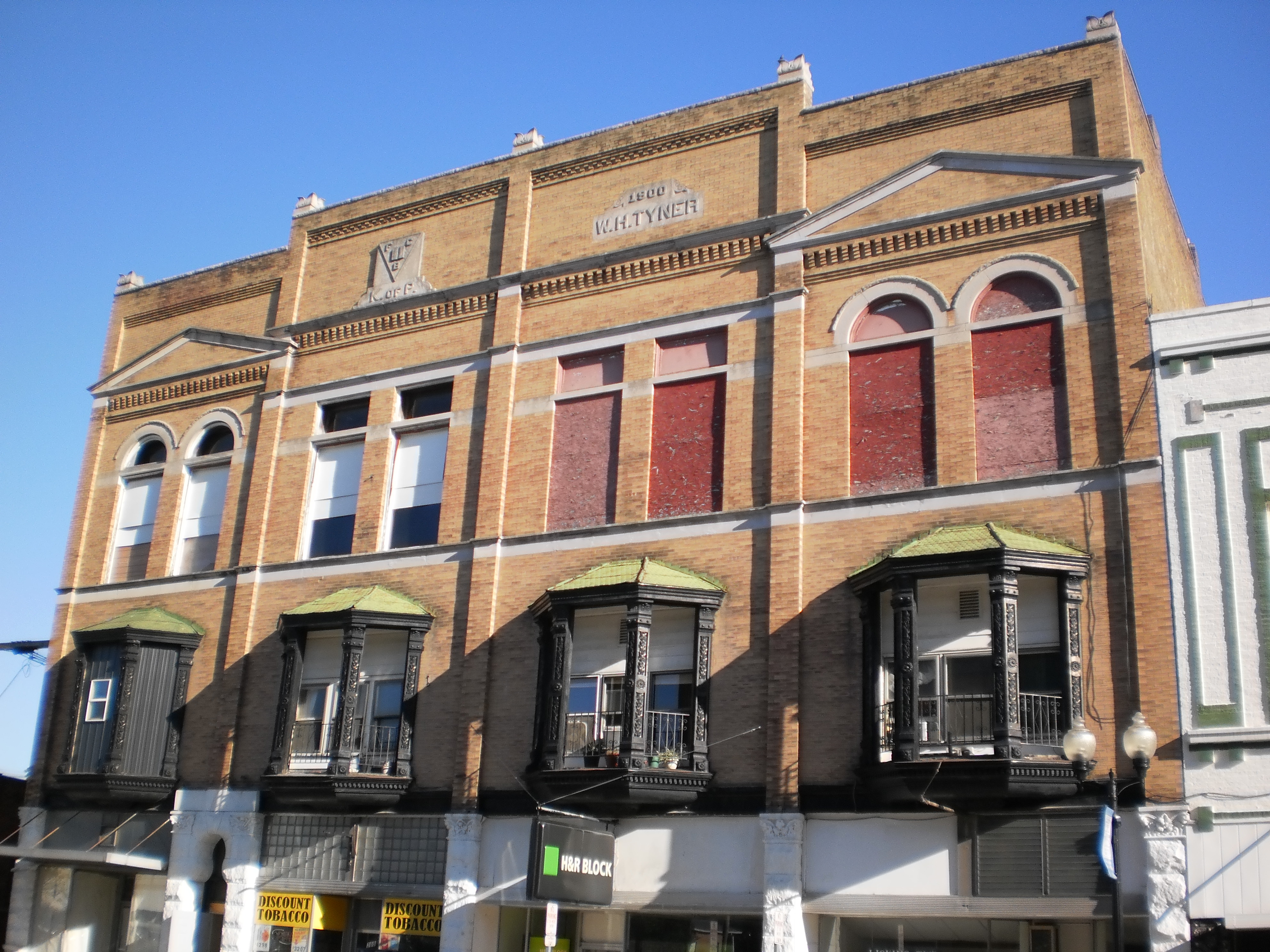
- One of the buildings on Main Street in the district

- Location within Blackford County, Indiana Location within Indiana Location within the United States
- Location: Roughly bounded by Franklin, Walnut, Water and Monroe Sts., Hartford City, Indiana United States
- Coordinates: 40°27′5″N 85°22′5″W
- Area: 19 acres (7.7 ha)
- Architects: Arthur LaBelle; Burt French; P.J. Loney; others
- Architectural style: Italianate, Romanesque Revival, Renaissance Revival, Queen Anne, Art Deco
- NRHP reference No.: 06000522
- Added to NRHP: June 21, 2006

The Hartford City Courthouse Square Historic District is located in Hartford City, Indiana. Hartford City has a population of about 7,000 and is the county seat of Blackford County and the site of the county courthouse. The National Park Service of the United States Department of the Interior added the Hartford City Courthouse Square Historic District to the National Register of Historic Places on June 21, 2006—meaning the buildings and objects that contribute to the continuity of the district are worthy of preservation because of their historical and architectural significance. The District has over 60 resources, including over 40 contributing buildings, over 10 non-contributing buildings, one contributing object (a World War I statue), eight non-contributing objects, and two other buildings that are listed separately in the National Register.

Much of the District's significance relates to the discovery of natural gas in the east central region of Indiana. The discovery led to a regional economic boom known as the Indiana Gas Boom. Beginning in the late 1880s and lasting for about 15 years, the Gas Boom changed the economy and the appearance of the region. The Hartford City Courthouse Square Historic District is situated in what was the center of Hartford City in the 19th and 20th centuries, and most of the buildings within the District were constructed during the Gas Boom era. The buildings within the District were built in several architectural styles, including Commercial Italianate, Romanesque Revival, Renaissance Revival, and others. Many of the buildings' exteriors have not been changed from their original appearance.

== History ==
Hartford City began in the late 1830s as a few log cabins near a creek in East Central Indiana. The community was originally named Hartford. This was later changed to "Hartford City" after it was discovered that another "Hartford" already existed elsewhere in Indiana. The East Central Indiana version of Hartford was named county seat of Blackford County early in its existence, thereby ensuring its importance. It took over 40 years for the rural community to grow to a population of nearly 1,500. During that time, community planners had the foresight to plan for railroads, which linked the community to other cities, beginning in the 1860s. With a focus on agriculture, the entire county had only 171 people working in manufacturing as of June, 1880.

Hartford City Gas and Oil Company was formed in February 1887, and the company found natural gas in March of the same year. Surnames of some of the directors of this company can be found on the District's buildings today — Campbell, Smith, Dowell, and Weiler. Both oil and natural gas were discovered in the county in 1887, and the city began a period of rapid growth. Described as the "future metropolis of Eastern Indiana", the city successfully used its railroad facilities and abundant natural gas resource as enticements for manufacturers to locate there, and became a boom town. Hartford City was not alone with its good fortune — natural gas (and some oil) had also been discovered in adjacent counties. The entire East Central Indiana region was transformed during a fifteen to twenty-year period that became known as the Indiana Gas Boom, as manufacturers moved to the area.

Upon examination of Hartford City's infrastructure, the Gas Boom's transformation of the city is apparent. The wooden buildings surrounding the courthouse prior to the Gas Boom were vulnerable to fire, and the District had at least three major fires between 1871 and 1881. During the Gas Boom, wooden buildings were torn down and replaced with brick buildings. The courthouse was replaced with a magnificent stone and brick structure (see recent photo herein). Eventually, an interurban rail line ran by the east side of the courthouse square, providing easy access to the courthouse square commercial district and adding to the two rail lines that already served the city. The Gas Boom's economic transformation of the city is also apparent when examining the city's population. By 1900, the city had grown to a population of 5,912. Over 1,200 people worked in manufacturing in Hartford City in 1902 — and this was in addition to the bankers, merchants, physicians, and lawyers necessary for a growing population. These population and manufacturing figures are considerably larger than the pre-Gas Boom figures for 1880.

The gas and oil became depleted in the early 20th century, and the Gas Boom era came to an end. However, Hartford City was permanently changed. The city's infrastructure was vastly improved. Buildings in the commercial district surrounding the courthouse square were made of brick and stone instead of wood. A municipal waterworks was built in 1894. Telephones became available to Hartford City's surrounding rural areas in 1903. By 1914, 98 percent of the houses in Hartford City were wired for electricity. Roads were being paved, and the interurban line made it easier to travel to/from other cities. While some of the manufacturing facilities that depended on a low-cost source of fuel were closed after the boom, others remained in the city because they did not have a better alternative. A city that had very few manufacturing jobs now had a supply of skilled manufacturing personnel. Some of this skilled workforce remained in the city after the boom, while some found new occupations in the automobile and auto parts manufacturing facilities that were beginning to be located in nearby cities.

== Architecture ==
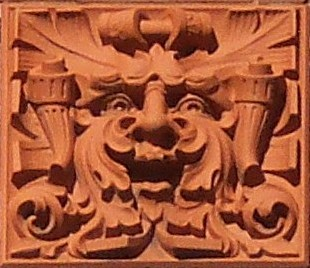
A carving on the side of the Weiler Building

Three styles of architecture are well represented in the collection of buildings that are part of the Hartford City Courthouse Square Historic District: Commercial Italianate, Renaissance Revival, and Romanesque Revival. A few examples of the Queen Anne style can also be found. Grouped together, these styles are called Victorian architecture, and buildings constructed in these styles during the 19th century are more likely to have decorative ornamentation (such as the face-like object from the east side of the Weiler Building shown herein) than buildings constructed later in the 20th century. Because many of the District's buildings were constructed during the Gas Boom era (between 1885 and 1905), these styles of architecture are more prevalent than the styles that became popular later in the 20th century. However, additional architecture styles are also represented. An outstanding example of the Art Deco style can be found in the district's Scheidler Theatre, and the Post Office is the single outstanding example of the Neoclassical style. The commercial building at 210 East Washington Street is the District's sole representative of the Art Moderne style of architecture.

Romanesque Revival architecture was very popular in Hartford City, and at least 7 of the District's contributing buildings were built using this style. This style of architecture is known for round arches in many of the openings. Smooth surfaces, sometimes with belt courses are also typical. A variation of the Romanesque Revival architectural style known as Richardsonian Romanesque was popular in America near the end of the 19th century, when much of the construction around Hartford City's courthouse took place. The courthouse and Presbyterian Church are outstanding examples of Henry Hobson Richardson's variation in Romanesque Revival style. (See photos herein.) A corner tower, arched windows, recessed entrances, steeply pitched roofs, and multiple exterior textures (rustication) are typical of this style of architecture. The Richardsonian Romanesque buildings differ from the original Romanesque Revival buildings by having rough-textured exterior surfaces instead of all-smooth surfaces. The Hotel Ingram, Kirshbaum, and Weiler buildings were built in Romanesque Revival style with arched windows and multiple exterior textures, but they were not identified in the National Register of Historic Places Registration Form as Richardsonian (see photos of all three buildings herein.)

== Boundaries ==
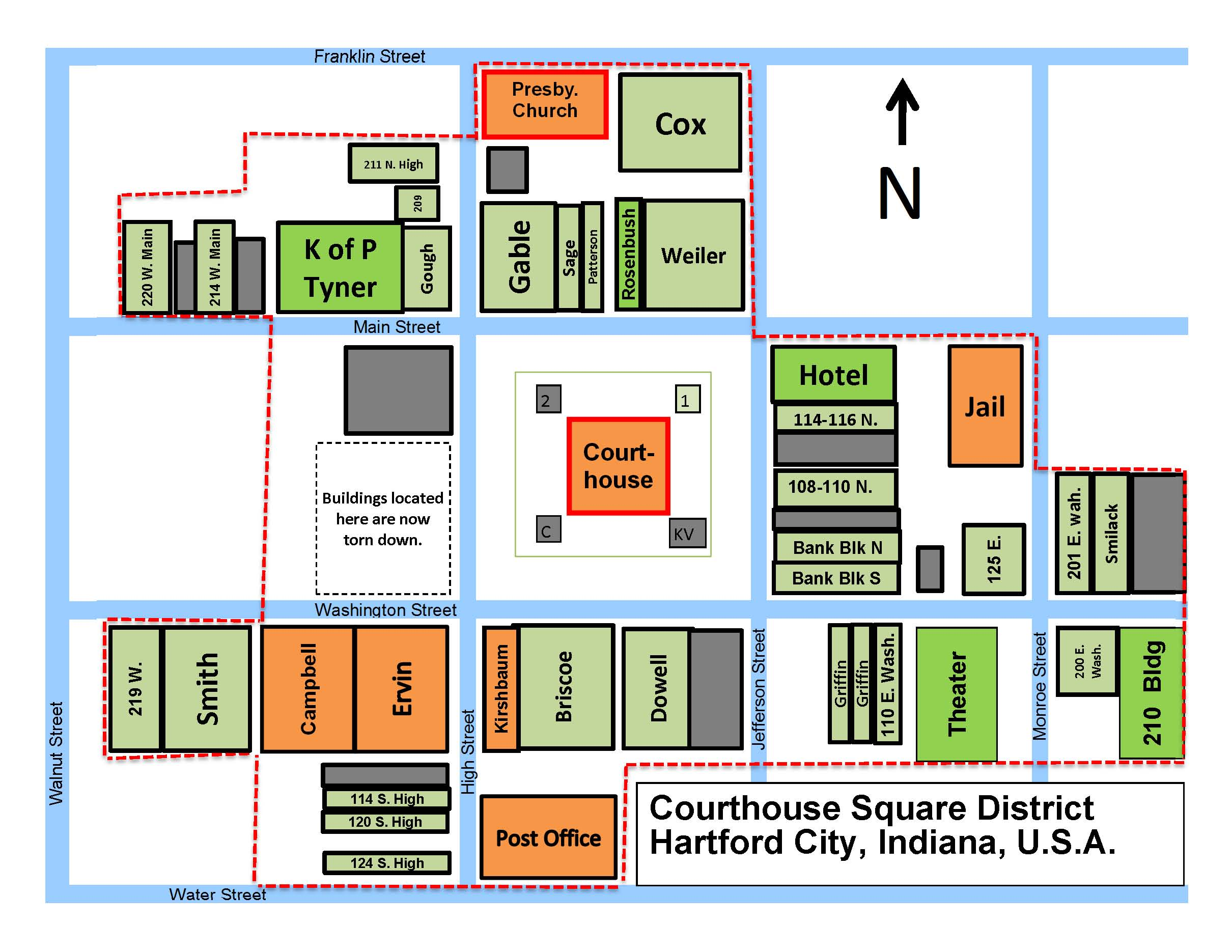

Located in the original center of the community, the Hartford City Courthouse Square Historic District includes significant portions of the city's historic commercial district. The town was platted using the Public Land Survey System typical of Northwest Ordinance communities — with rectangular blocks, and streets running north–south and east–west. Hartford City's layout of a courthouse surrounded by an open area was a common design in the "Midwest" of the United States. The Courthouse Square Historic District includes the courthouse and surrounding blocks. Franklin Street is the northernmost street in the district, and Water Street borders part of the southern part of the district. The west side is past High Street almost to Walnut Street, and the east side reaches half a block past Monroe Street toward Mulberry Street. The adjacent diagram shows the district and its buildings. (The buildings may not be exactly to scale.) The property locations shown in orange are the sites of outstanding buildings of historic and/or architectural significance. Two of these buildings, the Blackford County Courthouse and the First Presbyterian Church, are listed in the National Register of Historic Places. The locations shown in bright green are for buildings considered notable in historic or architectural significance, and the buildings sites (and one monument) denoted in pale green contribute to the continuity of the district. The dark gray locations are for properties that do not contribute to the historic district. At least two contributing buildings have been torn down since the Courthouse Square District was added to the National Register. Two additional Gas Boom era buildings located nearby and often mentioned in Hartford City history, the Van Cleve Block and the Cooley Block, were gone by the time the District was nominated for the National Register.

== Outstanding properties ==
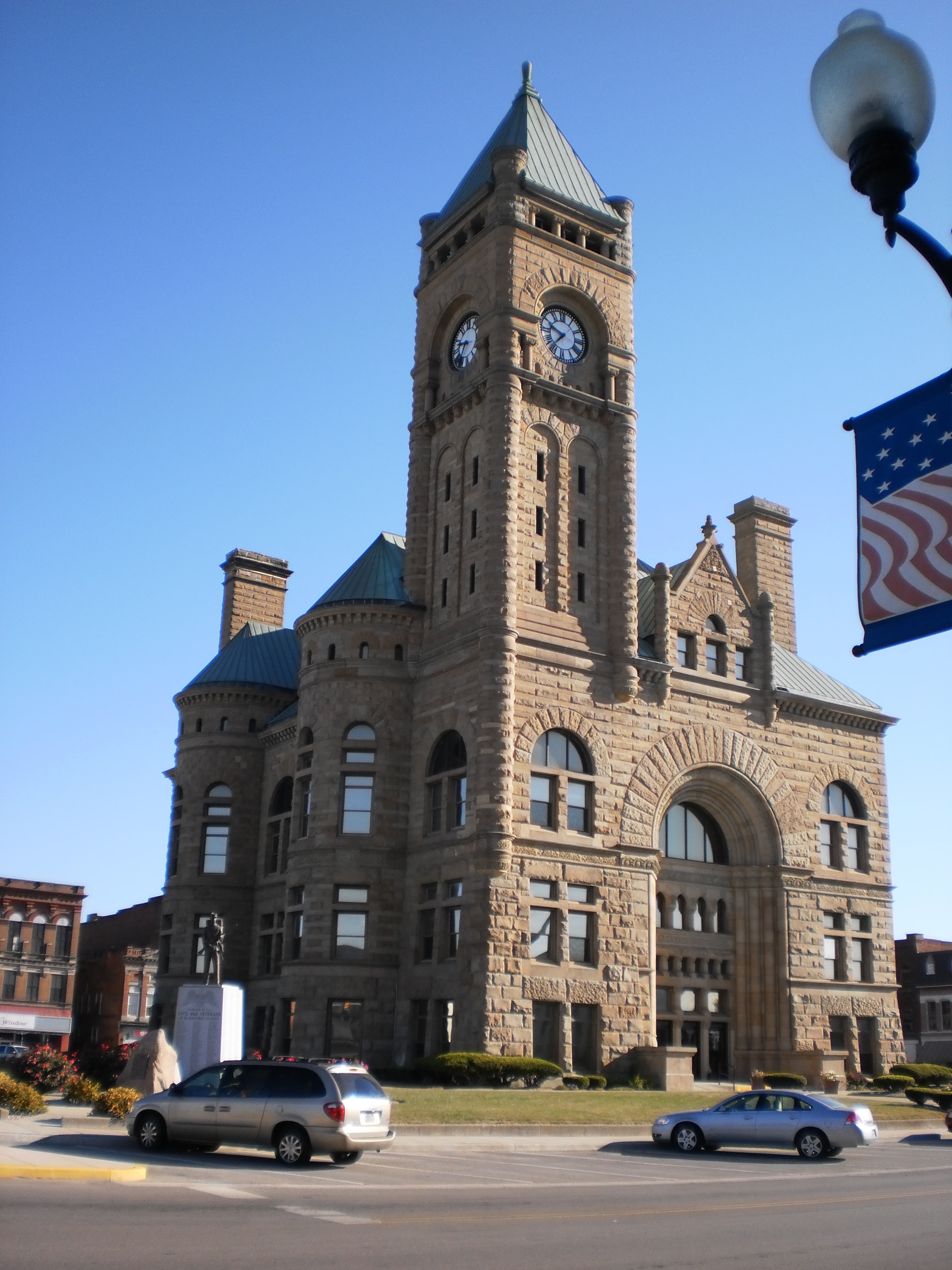
Blackford County Courthouse

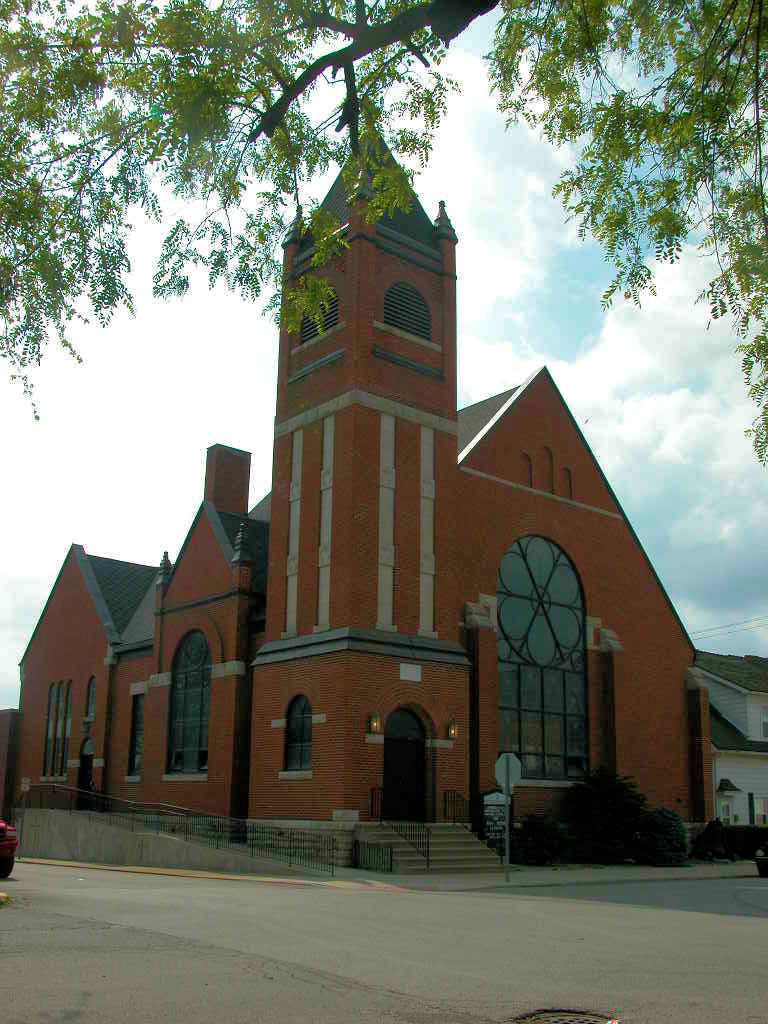
First Presbyterian Church

The Historic Landmarks Foundation of Indiana, which has since been renamed Indiana Landmarks, identified seven properties within the Courthouse Square Historic District that have enough historic or architectural significance to potentially be listed in the National Register of Historic Places. These properties have been assigned a rating of "outstanding", which is the top rating. The properties are assessed for their historic significance, architectural merit, environment, and integrity. All seven of the outstanding properties listed here are contributing properties to the Hartford City Courthouse Square Historic District, and two have already been listed in the National Register of Historic Places.

=== Blackford County Courthouse ===
The Blackford County Courthouse was added to the National Register of Historic Places on August 11, 1980. Like most of the other buildings in the Hartford City Courthouse Square Historic District, the Blackford County Courthouse was built during the Indiana Gas Boom. The county's original courthouse was condemned in 1893, and removed to enable the construction of a new all-stone structure. The courthouse was built by Christian Boseker & Son in 1894. Designed by Arthur LaBelle and Burt L. French (of Marion, Indiana), the courthouse features the Richardsonian Romanesque style of architecture. (See adjacent photo.) The building has two main entrances (north side and south side) that both open into a main hall. The walls feature marble paneling, and the ceilings are covered with paneled steel. (Fireproofing was an important consideration for the courthouse construction plan.) The magnificence in architecture and size of the courthouse dominates downtown Hartford City. The Blackford County Courthouse reflects the wealth of the city during the Gas Boom, and could be considered a monument to that era. Continuing the "monument" theme, the grounds of the courthouse are the location for American war memorials, including structures commemorating the Revolutionary War, World War I, World War II, Korean War, and Vietnam War. A Civil War monument was added in 2006.

=== First Presbyterian Church ===
Hartford City's First Presbyterian Church was added to the National Register of Historic Places on June 13, 1986. The building was designed by local architect Alec Gable, and built in the Richardsonian Romanesque style. Another monumental building built during the Indiana Gas Boom, construction of the church building started in 1892, and was completed in 1893. The church is the oldest church building in Hartford City. Located at the corner of Franklin and High Streets, the structure features huge stained-glass windows that were installed by local glass workers. (See photo herein.) The chapel contains features a pipe organ that was partially funded by a donation made by businessman and philanthropist Andrew Carnegie. With only one major addition to the original structure, the exterior of the building looks almost the same as it did in the 1890s.

=== Other outstanding properties ===
- Blackford County Jail The Blackford County Jail was completed in 1879, and it is considered an outstanding example of the Italianate style of architecture. It is located at 120 East Main Street. The jail is the Courthouse District's oldest contributing building still in existence. T. G. Tolan and Son was the architectural firm, and the firm of Hinkley and Norris (of Indianapolis) was the builder.
- Campbell Building The Campbell Building was built in the Renaissance Revival style in 1901. The two-story building is crowned with a large gable that bears a limestone tablet that reads "1901 Campbell". This building has the addresses of 207 through 211 West Washington Street. This building was originally an office building, and some of the occupants in the early 1900s were an attorney, a dentist, insurance agents, a physician, a realtor, and a steamship agent.

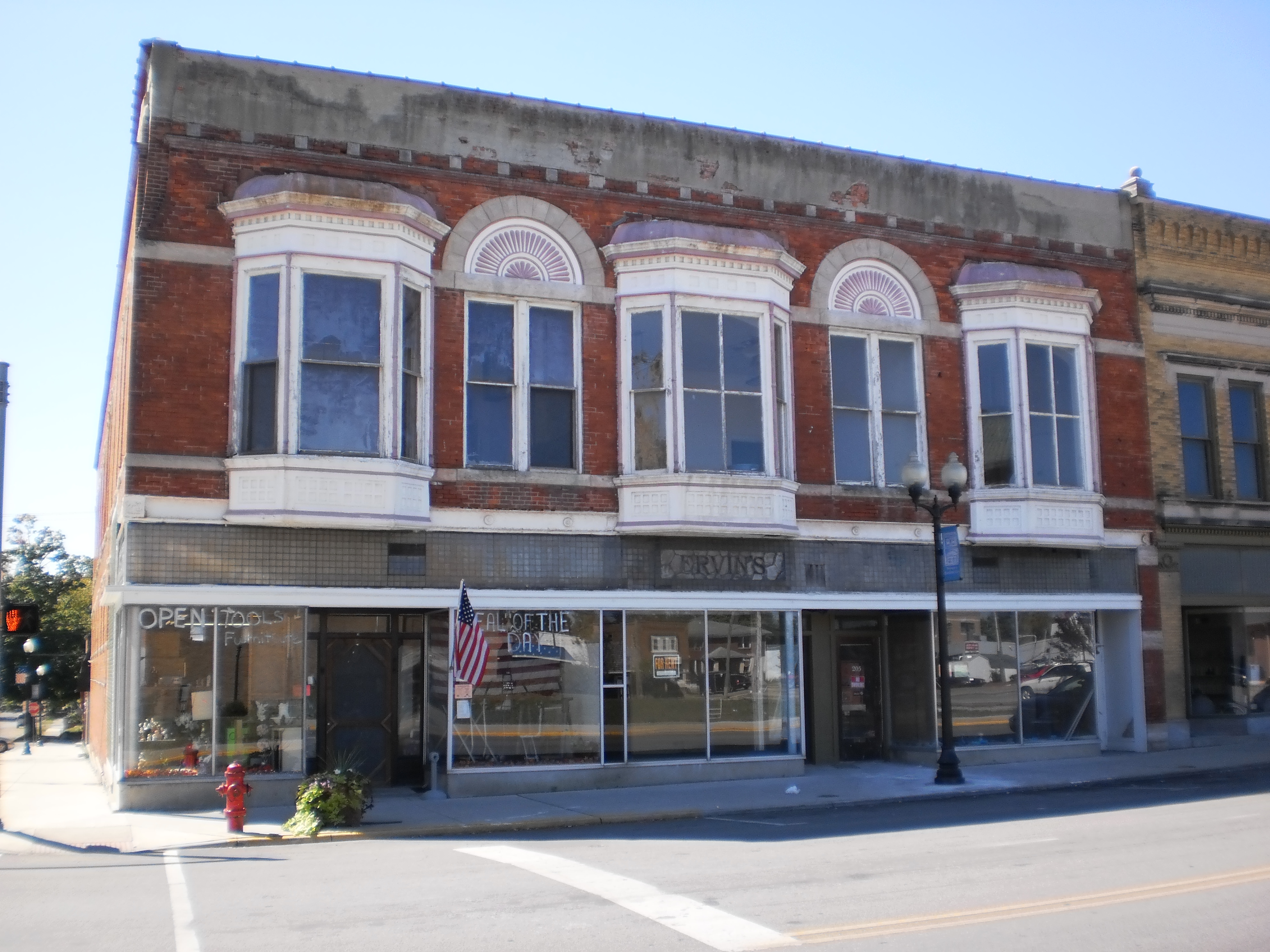
Ervin Building

- Ervin Building The Ervin Building was built in the Queen Anne style around 1890. It occupies the addresses of 201 through 205 West Washington Street. The facade of this corner building features three oriel windows. The name "Ervin" appears in stained-glass in the center of the building. The Campbell & Ervin dry goods store was housed in this building in the 1890s and early 1900s. The store sold clothing, hats, and shoes. (See 2010 photo herein)
- Kirshbaum Building The Kirshbaum Building was built in the Romanesque Revival style in 1893. It is located on the corner of High and Washington Streets, with an address of 123 W. Washington Street. An early occupant was the city's First National Bank, and its name is engraved in limestone on the building. The engraving "1893 Kirshbaum" is located centrally atop the cornice. (See 2010 photo of Briscoe Block and Kirshbaum Building, Kirshbaum Building is corner building on far right.) Raphael Kirshbaum (also spelled "Kirschbaum" in earlier years) was the builder of this building. Another building constructed for Kirshbaum in nearby Randolph County is listed in the National Register of Historic Places. Kirshbaum was a German merchant that sold goods in Portland, Union City, and Hartford City (all in Indiana). At one time, he partnered with Adolph Weiler in Hartford City. (See also section on Weiler's Building.) Eventually, Mr. Kirshbaum settled in Indianapolis, and was the key contributor for the Kirshbaum Center in that city.
- United States Post Office Hartford City's Post Office is one of the few buildings in the Courthouse District built during a period other than the Indiana Gas Boom. Built during the Great Depression, the project was Federal Public Works Number 207. Construction began in 1934, and was finished in 1935. Designed by Louis A. Simon, the Post Office is the only example of the Neoclassical style of architecture in the Courthouse District. It is located at 123 South High Street.

== Notable properties ==
The Historic Landmarks Foundation of Indiana has also identified five properties within the Courthouse Square Historic District that are above average in importance. After further research, these properties may have enough historic or architectural significance to be listed in the National Register of Historic Places. These properties have been assigned a rating of "notable", which is just below the top rating. The properties are assessed for their historic significance, architectural merit, environment, and integrity. All five of the notable properties listed here are contributing properties to the Hartford City Courthouse Square Historic District.

- 210 East Washington Street Commercial Building This building was constructed around 1940 using the Art Modern style of architecture that evolved from Art Deco. This architectural style is not found elsewhere in the Courthouse District.

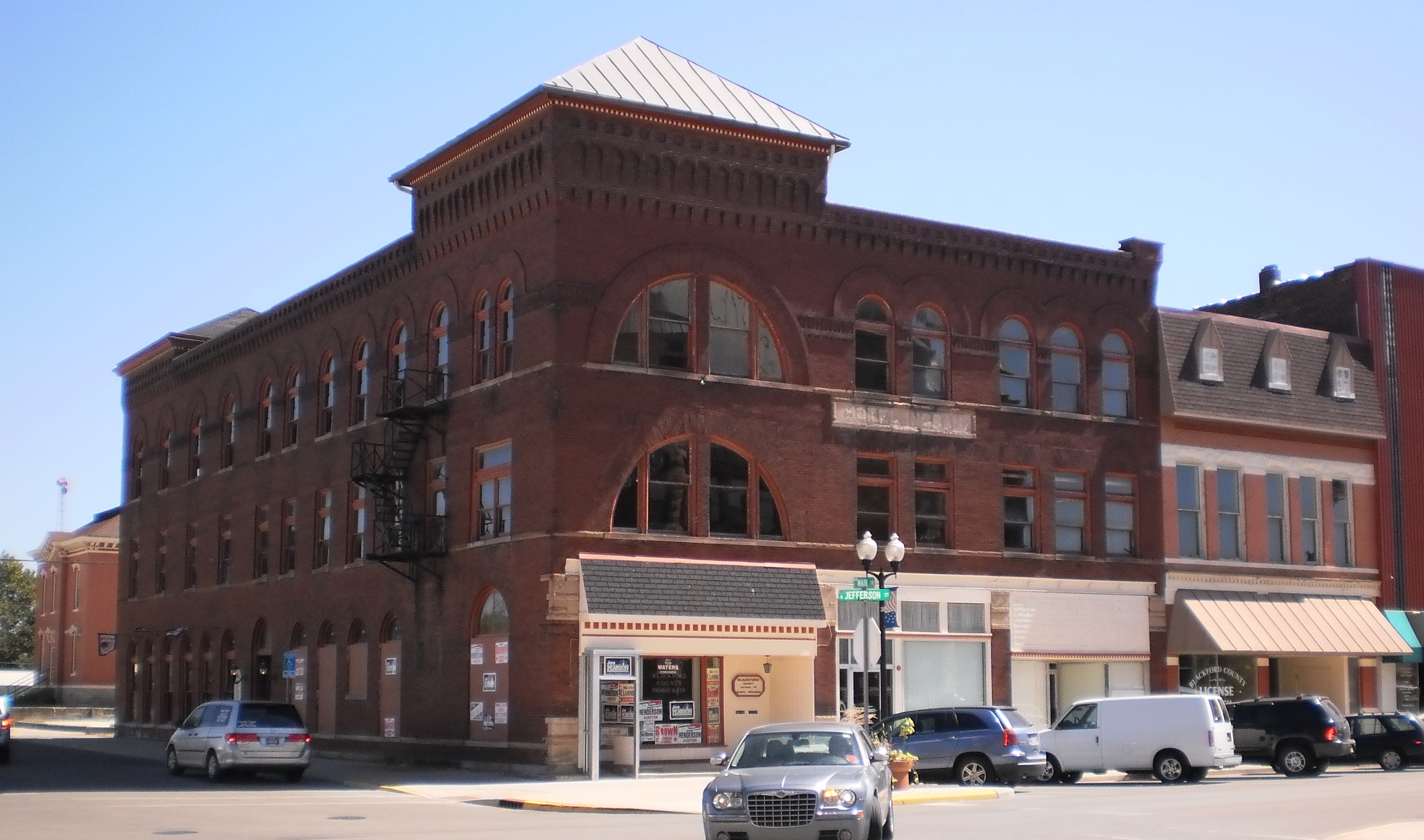
Hotel Ingram building

- Hotel Ingram A three-story building built in the Romanesque Revival style. This corner building occupies addresses of 118 through 122 North Jefferson Street, and is located at the corner of Jefferson and Main streets, which is the northeast corner of the courthouse square. (See photo herein) Hotel Ingram is written in limestone on the second story of the building's facade. The building was constructed in 1893, and opened to the public on January 9, 1894. The hotel originally had 45 guest rooms, and featured a large dining room with excellent food. The hotel building included a saloon known as the Ingram Bar. The Hotel Ingram's grand opening included a dinner for about 150 guests, plus entertainment provided by the Montani Brothers' orchestra. W. F. Crist was the hotel's original proprietor. During the hotel's first month in existence, it had 1,200 "arrivals". The building was also the site of the Ingram grocery. The hotel became known as the Hartford Hotel in 1922. George D. Stevens, a local business executive and one of the community's leading citizens, lived in a room at this hotel for many years during the first half of the 20th century. Stevens, who was described as "one of the richest men in Hartford City", made news after his death when it was discovered that he was a black man living as a white man in a town that had become all white.

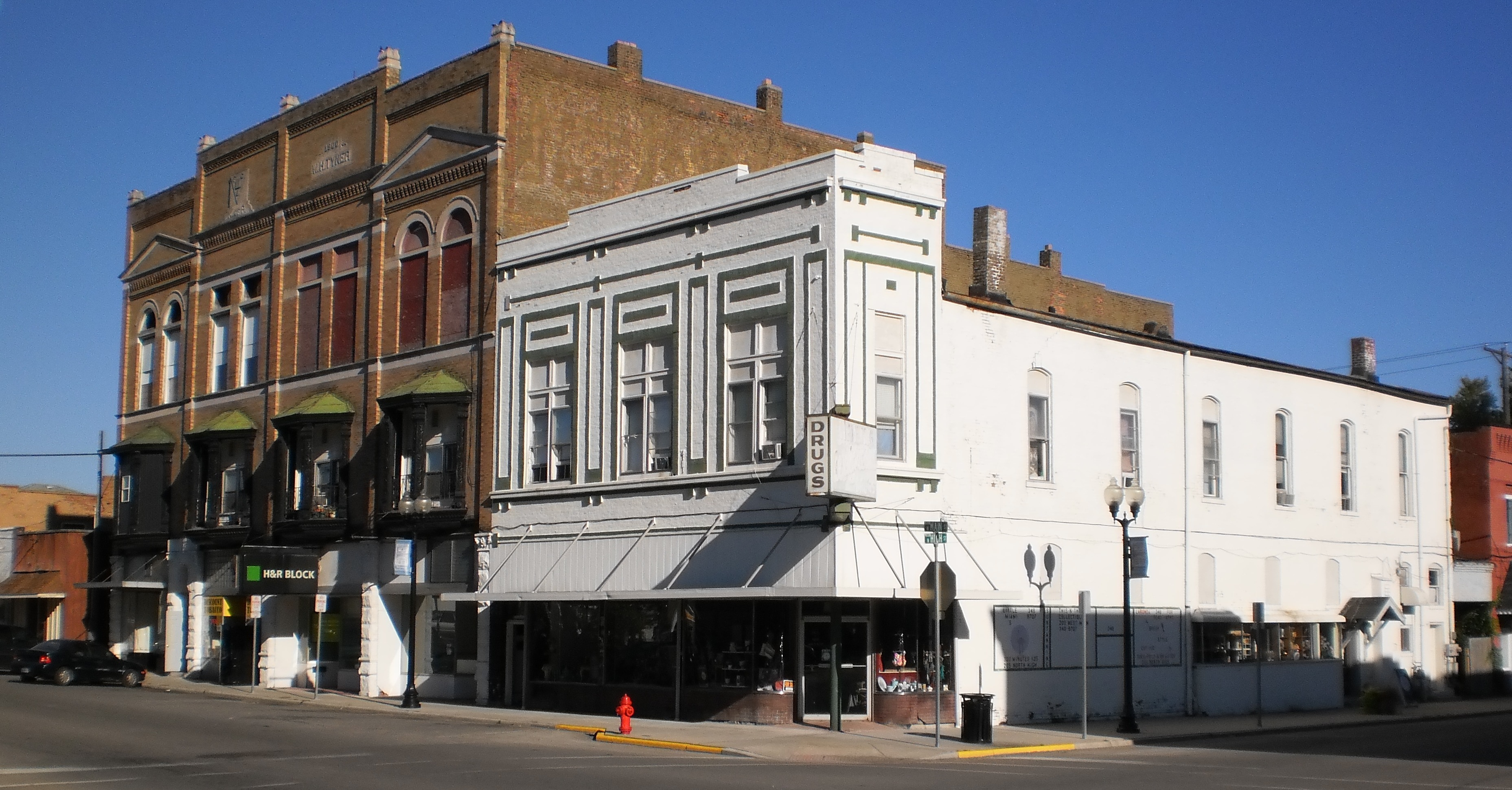
Knights of Pythias/Tyner building on left, Sowers & Gough drugstore building on right.

- Knights of Pythias/Tyner Building Designed by A. W. Maxwell and constructed around 1900, the building's architecture is a mixture of Romanesque, Classical, and Queen Anne, and it is located at 204–210 West Main Street. (See photo herein) The three-story building also has decorative limestone elements that resemble flames — possibly in tribute to the Gas Boom. "K of P" can be found on a western tablet, while "W.H. Tyner" can be found in the eastern panel. Among the offices in this Main Street building in the early 1900s were a confectioner, a doctor, and an attorney. The Knights of Pythias, Fraternal Order of Eagles, and Maccabees all held meetings in this building in the early 1900s. During a tumultuous period in the 1920s, the Ku Klux Klan had an office on the third floor of the building. Three events helped drive the Klan out of Hartford City — including one that happened in the Tyner building, and one that happened about four blocks away. First, a disturbing murder case against the state Klan leader disgusted many members. (Charles E. Cox, uncle of local newsman and Cox Building owner Edward E. Cox, assisted in the prosecution of this case.) Second, a safe in the Tyner Building was broken into, and the names of local Klan members were revealed. Third, violence that occurred at an event a few blocks from the courthouse caused the Hartford City mayor to order the local Klan leader out of town in 1926.
- Rosenbush Building The Renaissance Revival building was built around 1890. Located at 110 West Main Street, the name Rosenbush can be found on the two-story building, written on a limestone tablet. The building has terra cotta star-like patterns on the brick above the windows. Tailor Aaron W. Rosenbush ran his business from this building in the early 1900s. The Rosenbush building was also the site of Rosenbush's Royal Theatre, where silent movies were shown accompanied by piano. Years later, when the theater was closed, the building was the home of a tavern. On June 12, 2014, when the Weiler Building was demolished, the Rosenbush Building was also demolished, due to the buildings sharing a wall.
- Scheidler Theater First owned by Matt Scheidler, this "very elegant and beautifully decorated" building was originally called the Hartford Theatre. Unlike most of the buildings in the district, this building was built after the Gas Boom, in 1947. Its architectural style is Art Deco. The structure is located at 122 East Washington Street.

== Other properties ==
Other properties, in addition to those listed as outstanding or notable, contribute to the Hartford City Courthouse Square Historic District. Many of these were also built during the Gas Boom. Some of the contributors are listed below.

The terminology used to describe the buildings of the Gas Boom era is slightly different from that used today. The term "block" was often used to describe the group of offices or stores located in a building instead of referring to the building. As can be seen in the boundaries diagram and descriptions herein, these "block" buildings did not occupy an entire city block, but they often had multiple storefronts or offices with multiple occupants. For example, the New York Times article from 1899 (see below) refers to the "Briscoe Block" instead of the Briscoe Building. The article also lists multiple businesses that occupied the building. Another example can be found in a business directory from the Gas Boom Era. Some of the attorneys (and other businesses too) listed their address as part of a "block" such as "Campbell Block" or "Tyner Block". Most of the building names used herein rely on the building names found in either National Register forms or publications from the Historic Landmarks Foundation of Indiana.

- Bank Block This two-story building was constructed in the Commercial Italianate style in the 1880s. In the early 1900s, Citizen's State Bank was located at the 102 North Jefferson Street address. A law firm and barber also listed "Bank Block" as their addresses. The southern portion of the original building still has much of its original appearance. It is located at the corner of Jefferson and Washington streets, with an address of 100 North Jefferson Street. However, the northern portion has been substantially remodeled, and is now considered a separate building. The words "Bank Block" are on the northern portion that occupies addresses of 102 and 104 North Jefferson Street. All of the north building's Commercial Italianate features are now removed. The Historic Landmarks Foundation of Indiana's Blackford County Interim Report has a picture, on page 63, of the entire magnificent building circa 1900.

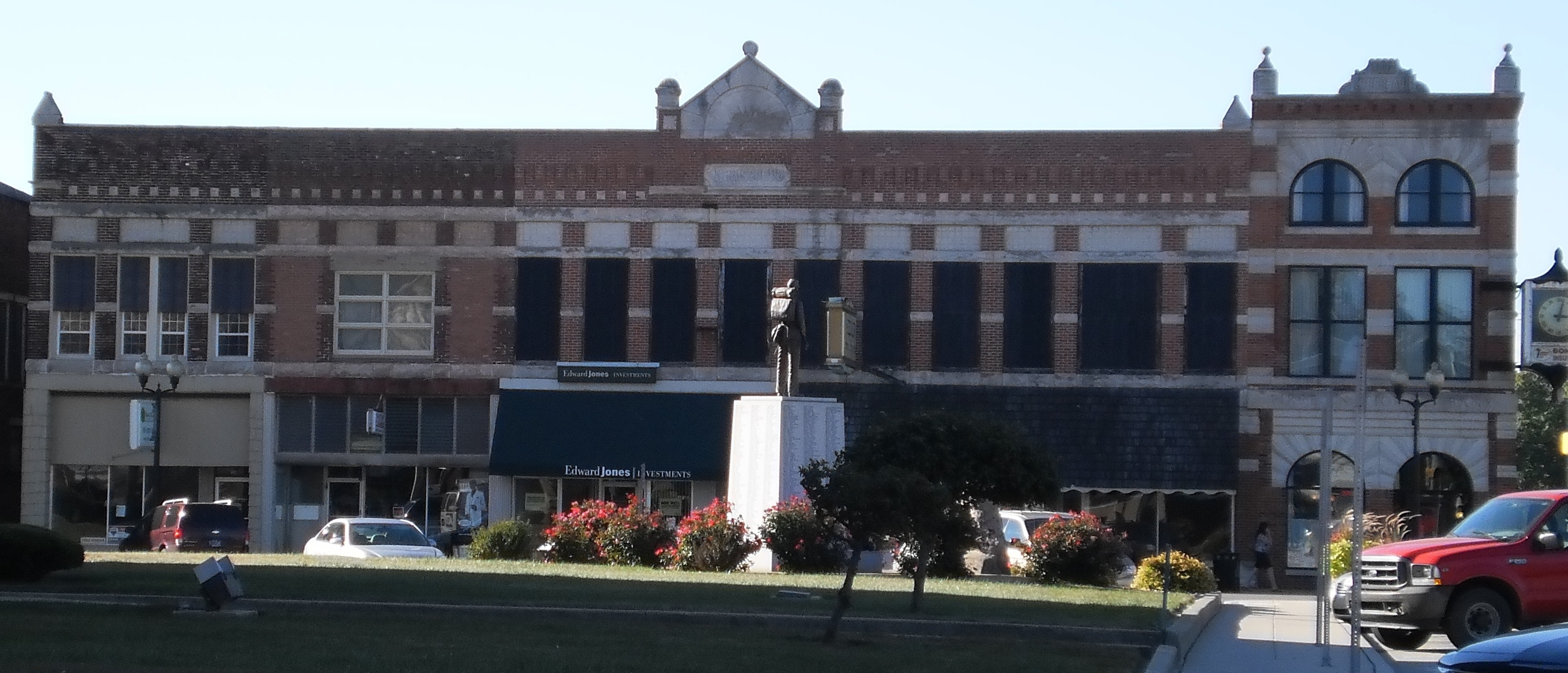
Briscoe Block (center) and Kirshbaum building (right) on south side of square.

- Briscoe Building This two-story Romanesque Revival building was constructed in 1893, and occupies the addresses of 113 through 121 West Washington Street. Three colors of brick are found on the facade, effectively dividing the building into three sections. (Adjacent photo shows building in 2010.) While the county's new courthouse was being constructed in 1893 and 1894, Blackford County's courtroom and office of the county clerk were located in two rooms in this building. In 1899, this building, described as the "Briscoe Block", was originally thought to have been destroyed by fire. However, the fire destroyed the roof of the building, and the remaining portion of the building escaped significant damage. The damage to the building was repaired, and the Briscoe Building still stands today. Occupants at the time of the 1899 fire included Kentucky Liquors, Western Union, Central Telephone, a grocer, and the J. L. Hoover Furniture Company — which later became long-time local retailer Hoover-Needler Furniture.
- Cox Building Located at 217 North Jefferson Street (Jefferson and Franklin streets), the Cox Building is simply identified as "Commercial Building" in the District's National Register of Historic Places Registration Form. An industrial building originally used for printing newspapers such as Hartford City's Telegram, its architecture style has some Craftsman influences. The original building was designed by local architect P. J. Loney in 1895, and owned by newsman and prominent Democrat Edward E. Cox. The Cox Building was expanded around 1915. The building was demolished April 26, 2016.
- Dowell Building Located at 107–109 West Washington Street, the Dowell building was constructed in 1893 using the Italianate style of architecture. Frank P. Dowell maintained an office in this building, conducting transactions related to real estate such as loans, mortgages, insurance, and titles. A notary public, he was also involved in buying, selling, and renting property. Frank Dowell's father is Jessie H. Dowell, founder and president of Hartford City Natural Gas and Oil Company. In 1887, this company drilled the city's first successful natural gas well. The Dowell building is located on the south side of the square, east of the adjacent Briscoe Block.

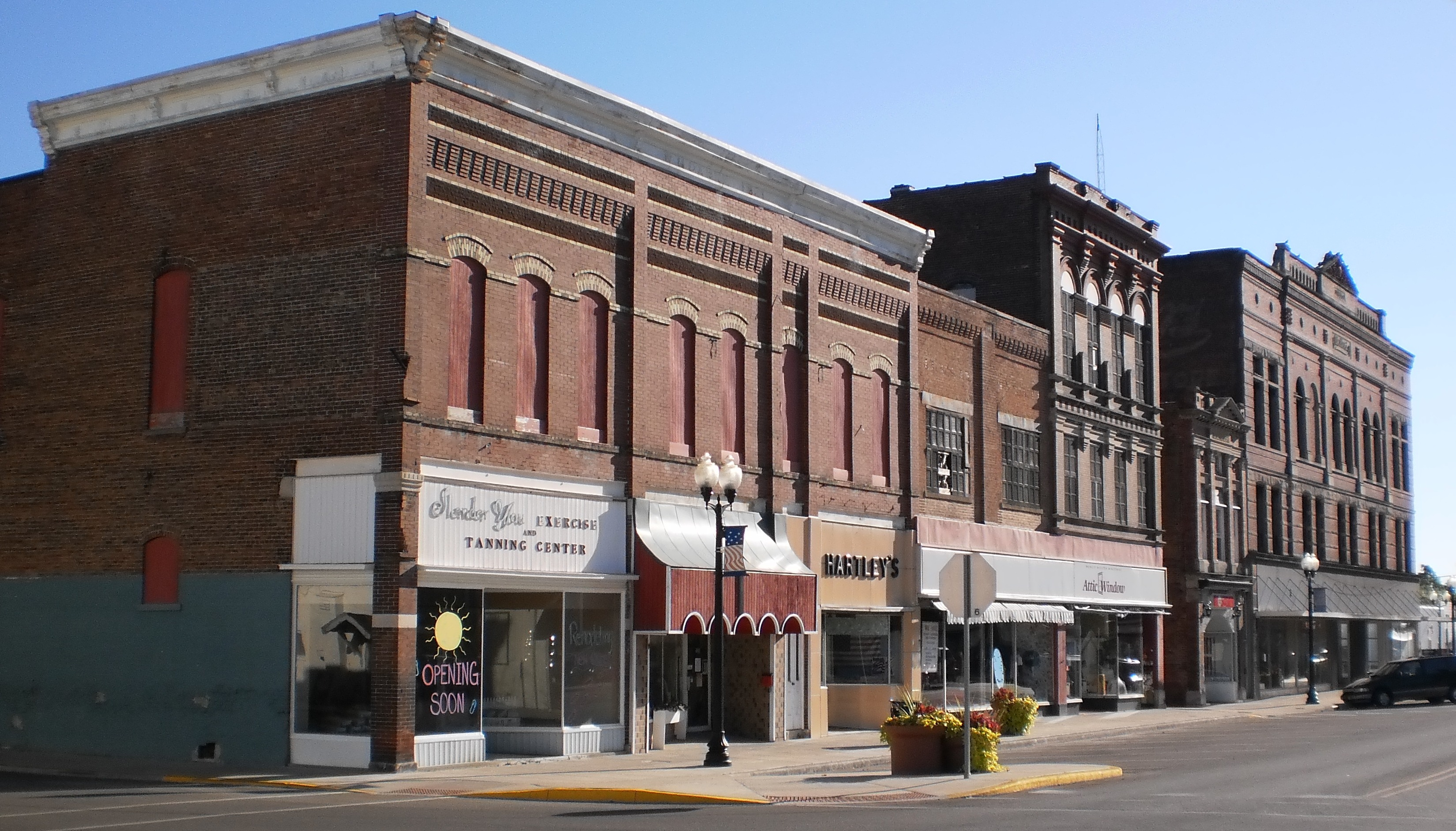
Gable, Sage, Patterson, Rosenbush, and Weiler's buildings on north side of square.

- W.H. Gable Block This two-story Commercial Italianate building was constructed in 1891, and occupies the addresses of 118 through 122 West Main Street. Five brick pilasters divide it into three storefronts and a stairway to the upstairs offices. "W.H. Gable 1891" appears in the center of the cornice. William H. Gable participated in the California Gold Rush in 1850 through 1852, and returned with enough money to begin various business interests, including furniture, undertaking, and real estate. The W. H. Gable business block was eventually built on land that was Gable's first real estate investment.
- Griffin Buildings Two Griffin buildings are located side by side with addresses of 106 and 108 East Washington Street. The name "Griffin" can be found on the cornice of both buildings. Both were constructed around 1900. The 106 East Washington Street building was built in the Romanesque Revival style, and a second source believes this building was constructed in the 1890s. It is believed that 106 was built to be a saloon and was the longest running bar in Hartford City. The Russell Lewis saloon was located at the 108 East Washington address during the early 1900s. 108 East was demolished in 2023. 106 is the only remaining Griffin building. 106 sustained damage in the demolition and is currently undergoing reconstruction.
- E. Smilack Building The E. Smilack Building is located at 203 East Washington Street. The building was constructed around 1910 using the Craftsman style of architecture. A stone tablet above the second floor says "E. Smilack". Elbert Smilack was a well-educated Russian, originally named Smilackoff, who immigrated to the United States in 1899. After brief stays in Philadelphia, Chicago, and Michigan, he found steady employment in Marion, Indiana. Smilack saved enough money to move to Hartford City with a horse and buggy – and 35 cents in his pocket. A friend loaned him five dollars to start a junk business. After about a decade in the business, Smilack was involved in scrap iron, metals, hides, fur, and wool. He also became a provider of coal and firewood. Smilack prospered enough that he was able to invest in land and oil wells. By 1914, he was considered one of the wealthier men in Blackford County. Smilack, along with other family members, was killed on July 22, 1922, when his automobile was struck by a passenger train.
- Sowers & Gough Drugstore This corner building, located at 200 West Main Street, was originally built around 1910, and remodeled using the Art Deco style of architecture around 1940. The Sowers & Gough Drugstore was originally across the street, but Gough bought the building at the 200 West Main street address and moved the drugstore after Sowers' health failed. Cecil Gough's drugstore became a favored gathering place during the 1930s and 1940s, as the store had a soda fountain and seating. The drugstore was bought by Merrit Tams in 1947, and was later run by Pat Mehling as Mehling's Drugstore. A 2010 photo of building, painted white and no longer a drugstore, is shown herein (notable properties section).

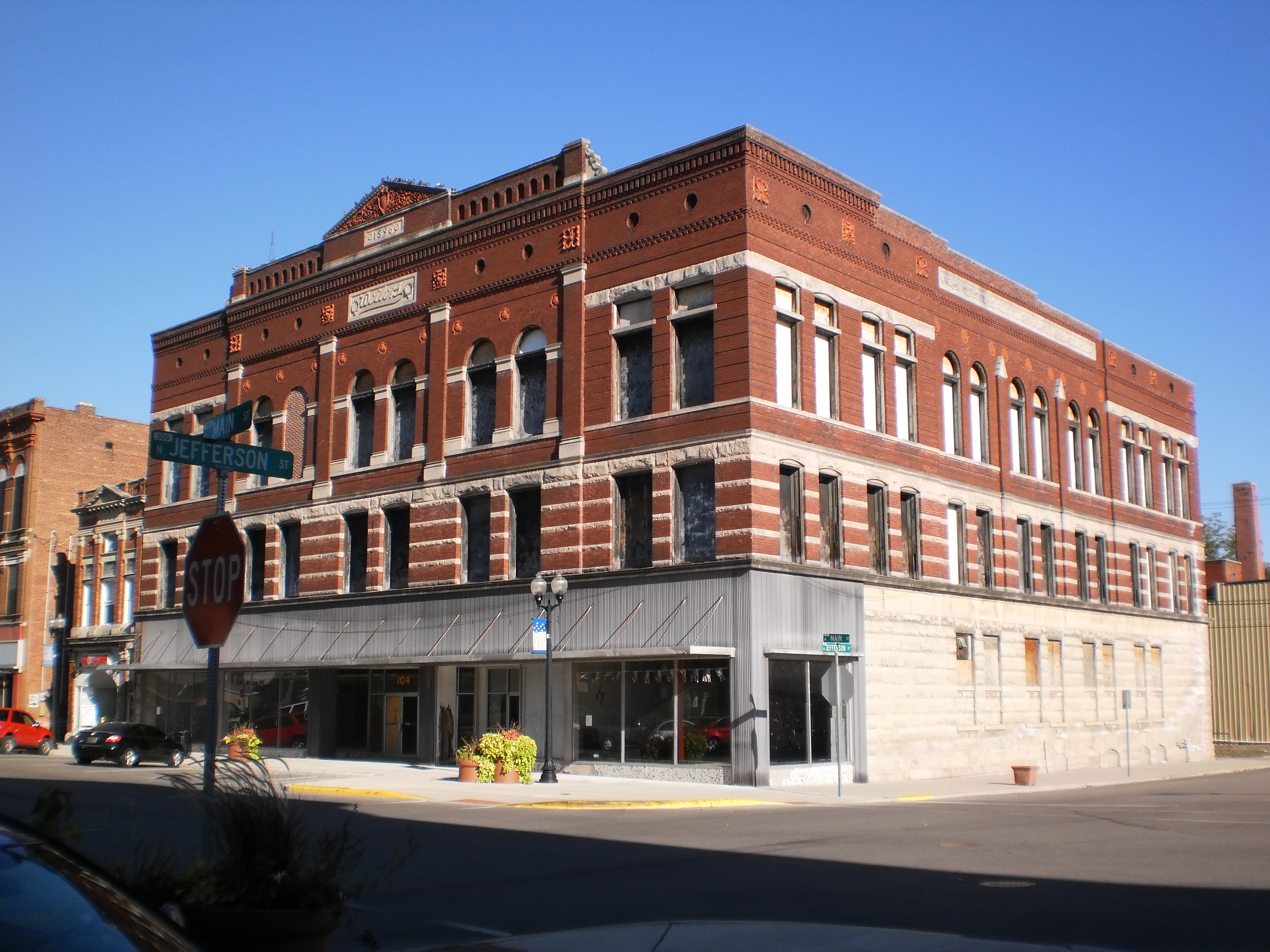
Weiler's building in 2010.

- Weiler Building Completed in 1896 according to the engraving at the top of the building, the three-story structure was built in the Romanesque Revival style. The Weiler name, written on a limestone tablet, can be found on the third story. The uppermost portion of the building above the windows features terracotta rosettes and faces of men. The building is located at 104 West Main Street. This building housed the Weiler Brothers department store, and later a Montgomery Ward store. At one time, the Weiler Brothers store housed in this building was thought to be one of the largest department stores in Indiana. During construction, over 250 feet of glass cases were ordered, and the interior furniture was said to be "equal to that in any store in the large cities." The store employed 80 people during the "busy season" in the early 1900s. The Weiler brothers originally involved with the store at this location were German immigrants Abraham, Adolph R., and Meyer M. Weiler. Abraham Weiler was also on the board of directors of the Hartford City Gas and Oil Company that had the first gas well in town. Abraham Weiler became involved with dry goods when he moved to Union City, Indiana, and worked with Raphael Kirshbaum. (See Kirshbaum Building, section above.) They later established Kirshbaum & Weiler in Hartford City, Indiana, and Weiler eventually purchased Kirshbaum's share of the business. The Weiler Brothers store was established in 1878, and moved to the Weiler's Building in 1896. Products sold included hardware, furniture, clothing, carpets, crockery, glassware, boots and shoes. Because of Ku Klux Klan-led boycotts of Jewish and Catholic merchants, Hartford City's Weiler store closed during the 1920s. On April 14, 2014, this building partially collapsed. Most of the damage was to the roof and the rear of the building. On June 12, 2014, the building was demolished.
- World War I Memorial Hartford City's Blackford County courthouse lawn is the home of numerous war memorials. The World War I memorial was the first of the four larger memorials to be located at the corners of the courthouse lawn. It was dedicated on September 28, 1921. James Taylor, president of Taylor University, was the dedication ceremony speaker. The sculptor was Ernest Moore Viquesney. The sculpture is known as the "Spirit of the American Doughboy", and this particular version was the third one erected.

== Significance ==
The Hartford City Courthouse Historic District is eligible for the National Register under two criteria. First, a number of events influenced the development of the area (Criterion A), most notable the establishment of Hartford City as the county seat, and the Indiana Gas Boom. The district is the historic center of Blackford County's commercial, social, and governmental activity. As county seat, the courthouse and nearby offices became the focus of Blackford County government. In the late 1880s, the Indiana Gas Boom brought major growth and prosperity to the region, resulting in the construction of numerous commercial, retail, and social facilities in the area surrounding the courthouse. Later, during the 1920s, the courthouse square was the site for events involving the Ku Klux Klan.

The second reason the district is significant is its collection of buildings and their architectural styles (Criterion C). Most of these buildings were constructed during the Indiana Gas Boom in the late 19th century or early 20th century, and have many of their original features. Three styles of architecture, Italianate, Renaissance Revival, and Romanesque Revival are all well represented, and additional styles can also be found.
