= Justice Davison =

Justice Davison may refer to:

- Andrew Davison (judge) (1800–1871), justice of the Indiana Supreme Court
- Denver Davison (1891–1983), justice of the Oklahoma Supreme Court
- Henry Davison (judge) (1805–1860), chief justice of the Supreme Court of Madras
- Ronald Davison (1920–2015), chief justice of New Zealand
