= Senator Hadley =

Senator Hadley may refer to:

- Galen Hadley (born 1942), Nebraska State Senate
- Jackson Hadley (1815–1867), Wisconsin State Senate
- John V. Hadley (c. 1839–1915), Indiana State Senate
- Ozra Amander Hadley (1826–1873), Arkansas State Senate
- William F. L. Hadley (1847–1901), Illinois State Senate
