= Jeremiah Sullivan =

American judge

Jeremiah C Sullivan
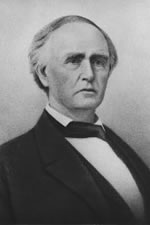
- Jeremiah Sullivan (Indiana Supreme Court portrait)

Indiana Supreme Court Justice
- In office May 29, 1837 – January 21, 1846
- Preceded by: John T. McKinney
- Succeeded by: Samuel Perkins

Personal details
- Born: July 21, 1794 Harrisonburg, Virginia, U.S.
- Died: December 7, 1870 (aged 76) Madison, Indiana, U.S.
- Children: Algernon Sydney Sullivan; Jeremiah C. Sullivan; Thomas Crook Sullivan
- Education: College of William & Mary
- Occupation: Lawyer

Jeremiah C. Sullivan (July 21, 1794 – December 6, 1870) was a justice of the Indiana Supreme Court from 1837 to 1846 and coined the name "Indianapolis" for the new state capital.

Sullivan's father, Thomas Littleton Sullivan, was the son of an Irish barrister and emigrated from Charleville, County Cork, Ireland, in 1791 to Augusta County, Virginia. Jeremiah began his studies at The College of William & Mary in Virginia. After serving in the War of 1812, during which he rose to the rank of major, he returned to Virginia to study law. He was admitted to the Virginia bar in 1816. Believing that there was more opportunity in the newly opened West, he ventured out to Louisville, Kentucky. On his way, he was told of the opportunities offered by Madison, Indiana, a new and growing town on the banks of the Ohio River.

He built his home in 1818 and from this base went on to carve a career as state legislator, state supreme court judge, county judge, Presbyterian elder, and Mason. He helped found nearby Hanover College and the Indiana Historical Society. Sullivan's public career was immediately successful. Jonathan Jennings, the first Governor of Indiana, quickly appointed him prosecuting attorney in Madison and within three years of his arrival he was elected a member of the state legislature. While in the General Assembly, he gave Indianapolis its name. He was a member of the Indiana Supreme Court from 1837 to 1846. In 1869, a criminal court was created for Jefferson County, and he was appointed judge.

Judge Sullivan's house, the Jeremiah Sullivan House, in Madison, is acknowledged to have been the first brick mansion built in the Northwest Territory. It is now on tour and is a component of the Madison Historic District.

Among his sons were Algernon Sydney Sullivan, founder of the Sullivan & Cromwell law firm in New York, and Jeremiah C. Sullivan, Civil War general.

== See also ==
- List of justices of the Indiana Supreme Court
