= Robert Gregory (Indiana judge) =

American judge (1811–1885)

Justice of the Indiana Supreme Court
- In office January 3, 1865 – January 3, 1871
- Preceded by: James Hanna
- Succeeded by: John Pettit

Robert Crockett Gregory (February 15, 1811 – January 25, 1885) was an American lawyer and politician who served in the Indiana Senate and as a justice of the Indiana Supreme Court from January 3, 1865, to January 3, 1871.

== Biography ==
=== Early life, education, and career ===
Born in Kentucky in 1811, Robert Gregory was the son of James Gregory, a North Carolina native who was a Ranger in the U.S. Army during the War of 1812 and later a member of the Indiana House of Representatives.

The Gregory family arrived in Indiana (Indiana Territory at that time) in 1813. In 1818, they moved to Lawrence County, settling near Bedford. Robert Gregory lived with his father until 1827, when he left home. He arrived in Fort Wayne, where he worked as a clerk at a dry goods store. In 1830, he moved to Fountain County, where he married. He worked as a trader until 1836. From 1832 to 1843, he lived in Crawfordsville, where he studied law with a local professor. He was admitted to the bar in 1838. He opened a private law practice in Crawfordsville with another lawyer named Alexander Thomson.

=== Political and military career ===
In 1841, Gregory, at that time a Whig, was nominated to represent Montgomery County in the Indiana Senate, filling the vacancy left behind following the former senator's resignation. Gregory served in the Senate until 1843, the same year he moved to Lafayette. Gregory would reside in the city for the rest of his life, opening up a new private law practice there.

In 1850, Gregory ran as a Whig in an election to choose a local delegate to the state's upcoming constitutional convention but was defeated by a pro-slavery Democratic candidate. In 1852, Gregory ran as a Whig for a seat in the United States House of Representatives, but was defeated by Democrat Daniel Mace.

In 1863, following Confederate General John Hunt Morgan's raid into Indiana, Governor Oliver P. Morton issued a call for volunteers to enlist to help protect the state. Gregory was one of the 65,000 Hoosier men who volunteered. Gregory was made First Lieutenant of the newly formed regiment and the men were sent to Cincinnati, though they were never called to action.

=== Judicial career and later life ===
By 1864, Gregory had become a Republican, and was elected to the Indiana Supreme Court during a statewide Republican landslide. Gregory and the other three Republican justices (Jehu Elliott, James S. Frazer, and Charles Ray) elected to the Supreme Court that year became known as "the Lincoln four." Gregory succeeded Justice James Hanna to the bench. Gregory wrote the unanimous opinion of the court in the famous case, Smith v. Moody, which struck down Article 13 of the Indiana Constitution that banned African Americans or multiracial individuals from settling in the state or entering into contracts. Gregory wrote that Article 13 violated the U.S. Constitution's Privileges and Immunities Clause. In his opinion, Gregory claimed that African Americans should be granted citizenship and were entitled to the constitutional rights of life, liberty, and the pursuit of happiness. However, Gregory also wrote in his opinions that African Americans were not entitled to the right to vote or the ability to hold public office, as these were not "essential characteristics of citizenship."

Gregory sought re-election to the court, but was defeated and succeeded to the court by Democratic Justice John Pettit in 1871. After leaving the Supreme Court, Gregory continued to practice law in Lafayette with his son, William B. Gregory.

=== Personal life and death ===
Gregory married in 1830 and had four children, two daughters and two sons (one of whom was the aforementioned William B. Gregory, who became a lawyer himself and worked at his father's practice in Lafayette before moving to Kansas).

Gregory died in Lafayette in 1885. He is buried in Lafayette's Springvale Cemetery.

Political offices
Preceded by James Hanna	Justice of the Indiana Supreme Court; 1865–1871	Succeeded by John Pettit
