= James Hanna (judge) =

American judge (1816–1872)

Justice of the Indiana Supreme Court
- In office December 10, 1857 – January 3, 1865
- Appointed by: Ashbel P. Willard
- Preceded by: Samuel Gookins
- Succeeded by: Robert Gregory

James McLean Hanna (October 25, 1816 – January 15, 1872) was an American politician, lawyer, and judge from the state of Indiana who served in the Indiana State Senate and as a Justice on the Indiana Supreme Court.

== Early life and education ==
Born in Franklin County, Indiana to a prominent local family, Hanna worked on the family farm throughout his childhood. Despite having only a few months of formal education, Hanna was a voracious reader. Following an apprenticeship in Brookville, Hanna gained his license to practice law in 1841 and moved to Bowling Green.

A Democrat, Hanna first became involved in Indiana politics after he was appointed Governor James Whitcomb's personal secretary. Hanna served as a prosecuting attorney in the state's Seventh Circuit Court from 1844 to 1846. Hanna ran for a seat in the Indiana House of Representatives but was defeated. He was later elected to serve in the Indiana Senate from 1849 to 1852, representing Clay, Sullivan, and Vigo counties.

After leaving the state senate, Hanna moved to Terre Haute in 1854 to set up a private law practice. In 1856, he was elected as a judge of the Vigo County Circuit Court. He left the position in 1857, when he was appointed to the Indiana Supreme Court on December 10, 1857, by Governor Ashbel P. Willard to succeed the retiring Justice Samuel Gookins. In 1858, Hanna was elected to serve a full term on the bench, defeating William D. Griswold (also from Terre Haute) in the election. Hanna's most notable opinion came in the case of State ex rel. Board of Commissioners of Sinking Fund v. Ristine, one of two cases concerning whether Indiana State Auditor Joseph Ristine had the right to refuse orders from Governor Oliver P. Morton to make an interest payment on the state debt in lieu of the General Assembly approving appropriations measures before adjourning. Following conflicting rulings in the Marion County Circuit Court, the Supreme Court sided with Ristine in both cases and affirmed his right to refuse Governor Morton's orders to make the payment. Hanna wrote the majority of opinion of the court in one case and Justice Samuel E. Perkins wrote the majority opinion in the other. In 1864, Hanna and other Democratic justices on the Supreme Court lost their races for re-election following an electoral sweep by Governor Morton and state Republicans. Hanna left the court in 1865, succeeded by Justice Robert Gregory.

Following his time on the Supreme Court, Hanna served briefly as the political editor for the prominent Democratic newspaper, the Indianapolis Sentinel (today known as The Indianapolis Star). During the Civil War, Hanna was sympathetic to the Confederacy despite living in the North. Hanna returned to politics in 1868 when he was re-elected to the state senate, representing Sullivan and Clay counties. His return to the state senate was brief, however—he resigned in 1869 when senators began to debate over ratification of the Fifteenth Amendment to the U.S. Constitution, which gave African-American men the right to vote.

== Personal life ==
Hanna married Elizabeth Susan Burton while living in Bowling Green. They had three children together, one son and two daughters.

Hanna spent much of his retirement on his large farm in Curryville, an unincorporated community near Terre Haute. Sullivan County's first underground coal mine was opened on Hanna's land. Hanna died on his farm on January 15, 1872.

Political offices
Preceded by Samuel Gookins	Justice of the Indiana Supreme Court; 1857-1865	Succeeded by Robert Gregory
