= Edward Everett Cox =

American newspaper publisher

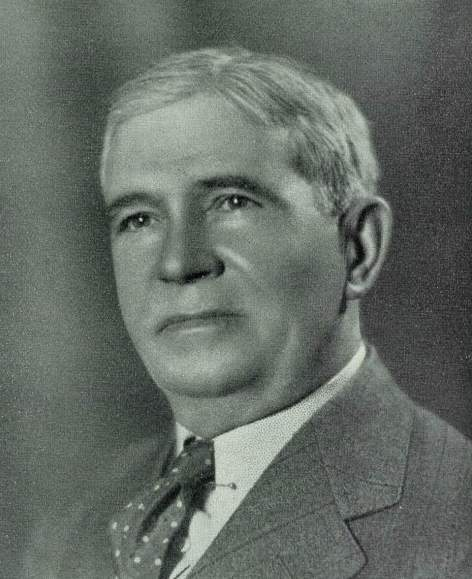
- E. E. Cox, circa 1930
- Born: December 29, 1867; Tipton, Indiana, U.S.
- Died: April 1, 1931 (aged 63); Hartford City, Indiana, U.S.
- Other names: E. E. Cox, E. E. Cox Sr.
- Occupations: Publisher, printer
- Known for: Newspaper publisher, politics
- Political party: Democratic
- Spouse(s): Eldora Sites (died 1898); Nellie V. Tozier
- Children: 2 sons, 5 daughters
- Relatives: Hon. Millard F. Cox (uncle); Hon. Charles E. Cox (uncle)

Signature
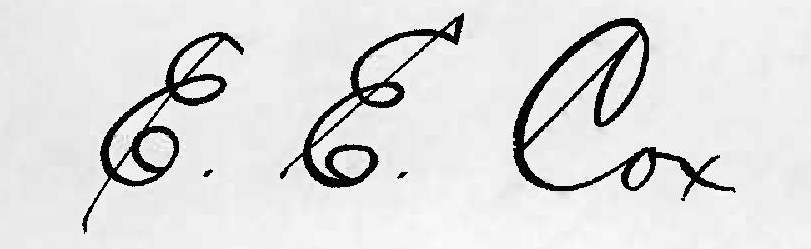

Edward Everett Cox (December 29, 1867 – April 1, 1931) was an American newspaper publisher who started Blackford County's first daily newspaper in Hartford City, Indiana. He is "considered one of the most influential forces in journalism" in Blackford County, and was a strong supporter of the Democratic Party. Serving as publisher and sometimes as editor of his newspaper, he also spent time as chairman of the eleventh congressional district, county chairman of the Democratic Party, member of the school board, and postmaster. His newspapers were a "voice" for the Democratic Party for nearly 40 years.

== Identity and origins ==
The Cox family came to America when the land was still a British colony, and Edward Cox is a descendant of an American Revolutionary War soldier that served with South Carolina troops. The Cox clan from which Edward was descended was a group of Quakers living in North Carolina. During the Revolutionary War, Edward's great-great-grandfather was part of a group known as the "Fighting Quakers", and was a friend of General Nathanael Greene. Edward Cox's grandfather, Aaron Cox, was an Ohio farmer that moved to Hamilton County, Indiana in 1850. In addition to his farm, Aaron Cox was a postmaster and contractor.

=== Judge Cox ===
Edward Cox's father, Jabez Thomas Cox, was four years old when the family moved to Indiana. Jabez was teaching school by the time he was 16 years old, and he began studying law shortly thereafter. He served in the Union Army during the American Civil War, keeping a diary that was later published. After being admitted to the bar, he began practicing law during the late 1860s in Tipton, Indiana, and many years later (1890 and 1896) was elected judge of the Miami circuit court. Jabez Cox had two brothers that would also become judges. One brother was Millard Fillmore Cox, who was named after the thirteenth President of the United States. Millard Fillmore Cox became a Marion County criminal court judge in Indiana, and also wrote editorials for the Indianapolis Sentinel. Another brother, Charles E. Cox, became an Indiana Supreme Court justice in 1911.

=== Family ===
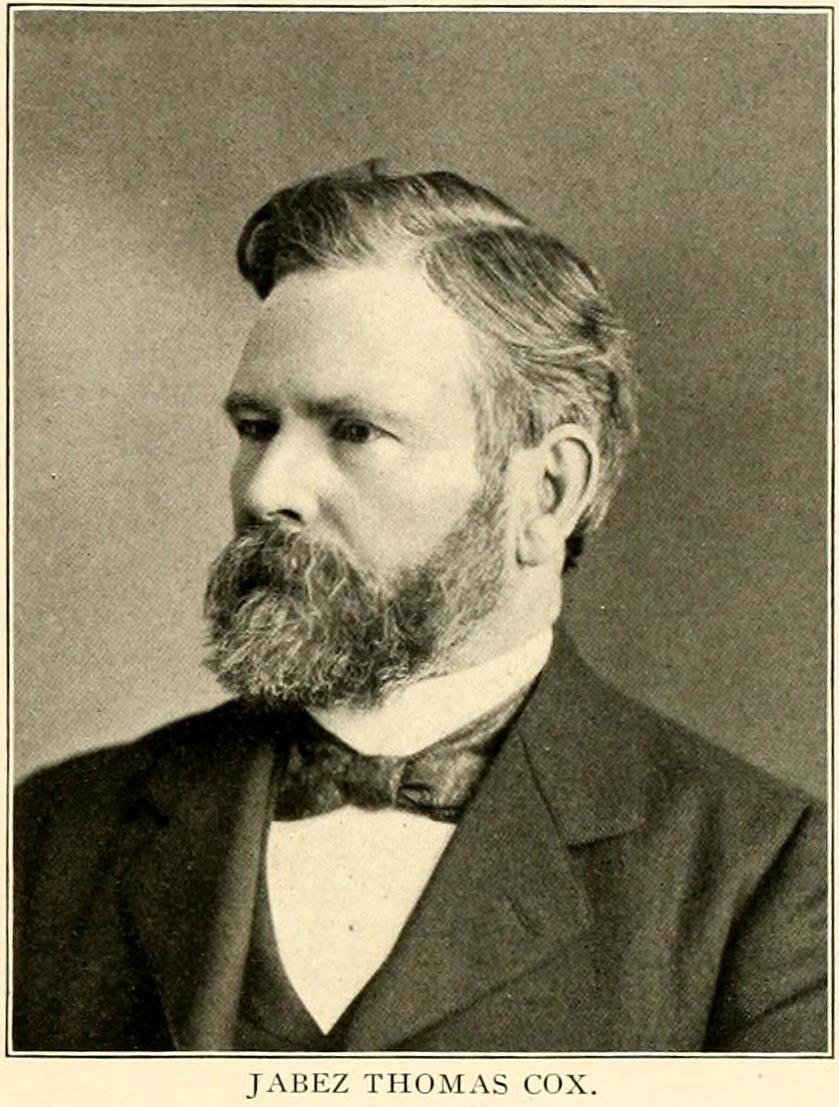
Jabez Thomas Cox

Jabez Cox married Jennie Price and fathered three children. His first child was named Edward Everett Cox, and Edward was born on December 29, 1867, in Tipton, Indiana. While it is not known for certain, Jabez probably named his son after Edward Everett – the noted speaker, prominent politician, and former member of the Whig political party. This seems especially probable since Millard Fillmore Cox had been named after the last President of the United States to be a member of the Whig Party. Ironically, the Cox family became strong supporters of the Democratic Party as the Whig party became irrelevant in the 1850s.

In 1869, the family moved to Frankfort, Indiana, and Jabez Cox became proprietor and editor of the Frankfort Crescent newspaper. In February 1872, Jabez Cox sold his newspaper company and moved back to Tipton and resumed practicing law. Edward Cox attended the local schools until 1875 when the family moved to Kansas. The move to a western climate was an attempt to improve the failing health of Edward's mother. Continuing to practice law, Jabez Cox also became more active in politics, and lost a Kansas election for state attorney general as a member of the Democratic Party. Edward's mother (Jennie Price Cox) continued to have poor health, and the family moved to Colorado in 1879 because of her physical condition. She died in 1882 in Canon City, Colorado. In 1883, the family returned to Indiana and settled in the city of Peru, which is about 40 miles (64 km) north of the earlier Cox residence in Tipton. After high school in Peru, Edward Cox attended Purdue University.

=== Teaching and journalism ===
Edward Cox began his post-scholastic career as a teacher (similar to his father's first occupation) in the Peru area's Miami County school district. After three years, he resigned his position as an educator to start a career in journalism, becoming a reporter for the local Miami County Sentinel newspaper. The newspaper business was another occupation in which Edward's father had also been involved. Edward's family continued its involvement in politics as Edward's father, Jabez Cox, won a seat in the Indiana state legislature in 1886. Edward Cox started Peru's Daily Herald newspaper in 1887, but it lasted only three months before it was suspended. Cox continued his journalism career in Peru as a reporter until 1891, when he moved to Hartford City, Indiana.

== Telegram ==
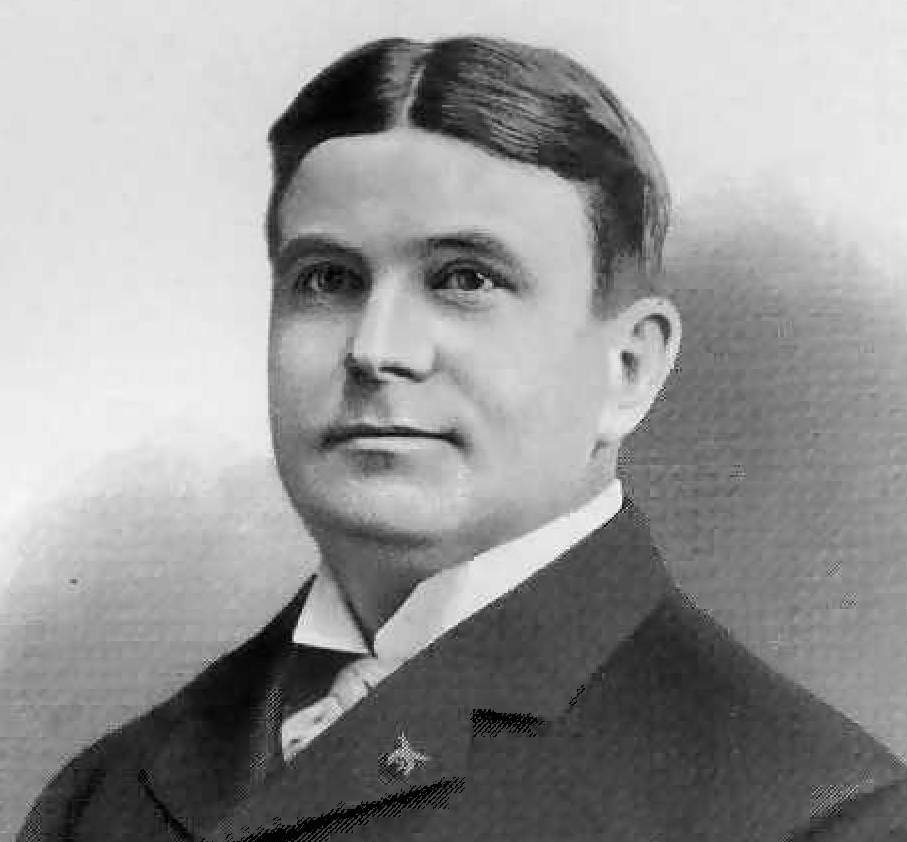
E. E. Cox, circa 1895.

In the spring of 1891, young Edward Cox purchased the Telegram, a weekly newspaper in Hartford City, Indiana. The purchase was made with the financial assistance of a second investor. Thus, Cox began a long career as a newspaper publisher and editor. The Telegram's printing facilities were located in the back room of a drugstore, with about 800 square feet (74 m^{2}) of space. Initially, Cox used a Washington Hand Press to produce his newspaper. The Washington Hand Press was roughly 70-year-old technology, and it took all day for him to print an edition, even with his newspaper's small circulation. Other related equipment was also crude. This was also a significant year in Cox's personal life, as he married Eldora "Dora" Sites in September.

In about one year, Cox replaced all of his printing equipment, and began using a cylinder press, which was a more modern piece of equipment. After a total of three years of printing, he upgraded to a press powered by a steam engine, and added other equipment that was the latest in newspaper technology. His newspaper equipment was far more advanced than that typical of a city of Hartford City's size. The advanced equipment enabled him to also operate a printing business. By 1894, the Telegram had about 1,200 subscribers. Hartford City's population ranged from 2,287 in 1890 to 5,912 in 1900, so 1,200 subscribers can be considered very successful. An advertisement in an 1895 Hartford City directory said the Telegram was Democratic and the leading newspaper of Blackford County. The paper was issued every Wednesday.

== Evening News ==
Because of the success of the Telegram, Cox began Blackford County's first daily newspaper, the Evening News (a.k.a. Hartford City Evening News). The first edition was published on February 5, 1894, and it was distributed free for the first week. Subscriptions were available with delivery to all parts of Hartford City for 10 cents per week. An advertisement in an 1895 city directory described the Evening News as non-political and possessing a "well equipped job office".

=== Hartford City News ===
By 1900, the Evening News was no longer non-political, and was considered the voice of the Democratic Party. Cox became known for his editorials, and the demands of the Evening News’ success caused Cox to discontinue the Telegram in 1914. Eventually, the "Evening" portion of the Evening News name was dropped, and the newspaper became known as the Hartford City News. Because the newspaper was a daily, one source incorrectly calls the newspaper the Hartford City Daily News.

In the 1920s, the Ku Klux Klan began gaining political power within Hartford City, bringing intolerance toward the city's Catholic, black, and Jewish citizens. Both local newspapers, the Hartford City News and the Times-Gazette, provided strong opposition to the Klan's philosophy. Cox's anti-Klan editorials irritated Klan organizer L. J. King enough that he referred to the Hartford City News as "that Catholic rag". Ironically, Cox was not Catholic. During 1925, Indiana Klan leader D. C. Stephenson was convicted for the murder of Madge Oberholtzer in a Noblesville, Indiana, trial that received national attention. Cox's uncle, Charles E. Cox was one of the prosecutors in the trial. Details of the case caused many Klan members to abandon the organization. By the end of 1926, the Ku Klux Klan lost its power locally and within the state. The Hartford City News continued its journalistic excellence, and became known as "one of the best and most influential daily papers in this section of the state."

== Cox Remarries ==
Tragedy struck the Cox family in 1898. Edward Cox's wife Dora died from pneumonia while visiting Edward's uncle (Millard Fillmore Cox) in Indianapolis. The family had two young daughters, aged five and seven years, at the time. Cox maintained a Hartford City residence on Jefferson Street, an easy walk to his newspaper business located on the same street, and raised his daughters for several years with the assistance of hired help. Cox remarried in 1901.

=== Married twice in one week ===
Cox, the newsman, made the news himself when he married twice in one week. His bride-to-be was Miss Nellie Victor Tozier, sister of news editor Albert E. Tozier. Although Nellie and Albert Tozier lived in Oregon, their politician father (Charles T. Tozier) was born in Indiana. Albert Tozier had been president of the National Editorial Association, and it was at the Association's meetings that the couple-to-be met. Thus, the couple-to-be had newspapers, politics, and Indiana in common. The wedding was to be held in Portland, Oregon, and Nellie Tozier was considered "one of Oregon's most popular young women." A few days before the wedding, the local county clerk died. Therefore, the couple's marriage license was issued by a deputy clerk. The wedding was held in the First Baptist Church of Portland, on November 18, 1901. Shortly after the wedding, the newlyweds began their journey east to Hartford City, Indiana. A major portion of their trip was via a Northern Pacific train to Chicago. Mr. and Mrs. Cox traveled as far as Spokane when they discovered that lawyers were debating the validity of all marriage licenses issued by the deputy clerk. An old Oregon law declared that only county clerks could issue marriage licenses, and this meant that the marriage licenses issued by the deputy clerk could be invalid. The couple continued their eastward journey, as most law experts believed their marriage license was legal. As the newly-wedded couple reached St. Paul, they received a telegram from the bride's mother that expressed concerns about the validity of their marriage. Adding to the complexity of the problem, Indiana law required residency for 30 days before marriage, so a wedding in Indiana could not be performed in the near future. Therefore, the couple wed again, in Chicago, in a ceremony performed by a judge. The bride's sister served as witness. The couple then had two marriage certificates, and they were the subject of news throughout the country. This marriage produced two sons and three daughters. Of Cox's total of seven children, three daughters and both sons attended college.

== The Cox building ==
In addition to using the latest printing technology, Cox also erected a two-story building used as the newspaper's office and printing facility. Local (Hartford City) architect P. J. Loney prepared plans for the brick building in 1895. Located at the corner of Jefferson and Franklin Streets, the building's layout was designed especially for the newspaper business. In final form, the building was a two-story, 40 by 120 feet (37 m) brick building with offices, an elevator, a loading dock, and an additional alleyway entrance. The address of the building was 217 N. Jefferson Street. The "Cox Building" was used by three newspapers continuously into the 1960s: the Telegram, the Hartford City News, (originally known as the Evening News) and later the Hartford City News-Times. Offices were located in the front of the building (Jefferson Street), and a dock was located on the building's Franklin Street side. The building could also be accessed from the alley behind the building, and that passageway was partially covered to enable paper to remain dry during loading and unloading in wet weather.

In addition to the newspapers, Cox used his building for his printing business. Both enterprises were part of his company, Edward E. Cox Printer, Incorporated. The modern printing equipment enabled Cox to print color labels and wrappers made of glassine and cellophane. Printing products were shipped all over the United States.

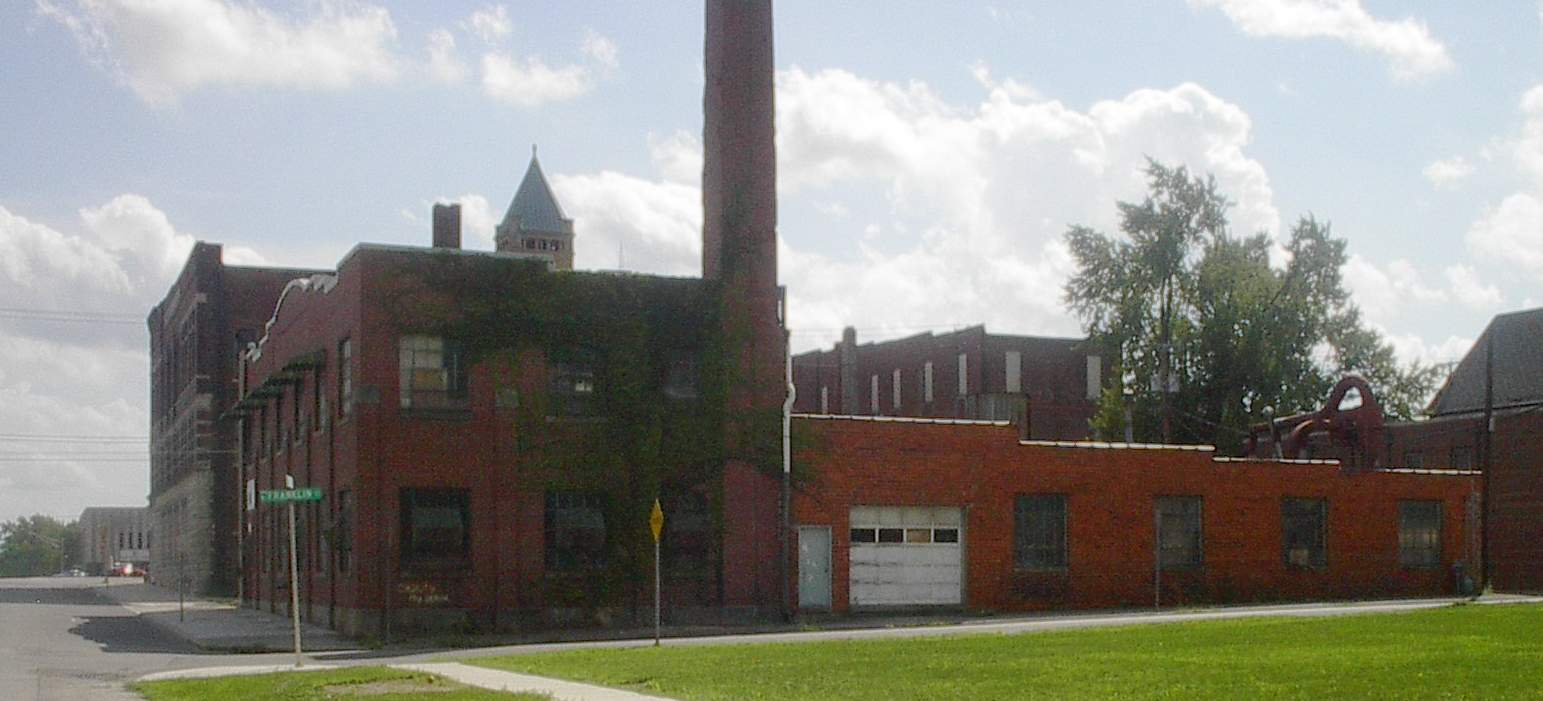
Franklin Street dock side of Hartford City's Cox Building

The Cox building lasted over 100 years —it was demolished April 26, 2016. The building was part of Hartford City's Courthouse Square Historic District. The photo herein displays the Cox Building from the Franklin Street dock side. The front (Jefferson Street) entrance is to the left in the photo. Hartford City's two buildings that are part of the National Register of Historic Places are located close by. The back of the First Presbyterian Church is visible on the right side of the photo to the right of the alley, and the Blackford County Courthouse steeple can be seen at the top of the photo to the left of the Cox Building's smokestack.

Although the Hartford City News-Times moved out of the Cox Building in the 1960s, the building was used by other businesses. A large portion of the building was used in the 1970s by a company partly owned by one of Cox's grandsons. The company was called Phylpat, Incorporated. Instead of printing on paper as Cox had, Phylpat (eventually renamed Cutting Inc.) was involved in cutting paper to make small rolls of adding machine paper. The paper cutting and winding operations were contained within the building, and there was room for inventories of raw materials and finished product. The process used to cut and roll (or wind) paper was patented by Phylpat and one of its engineers in 1976. In more recent years, the building was used by a small furniture manufacturing company, and one of the offices had been used by an attorney.

== Politics and community ==
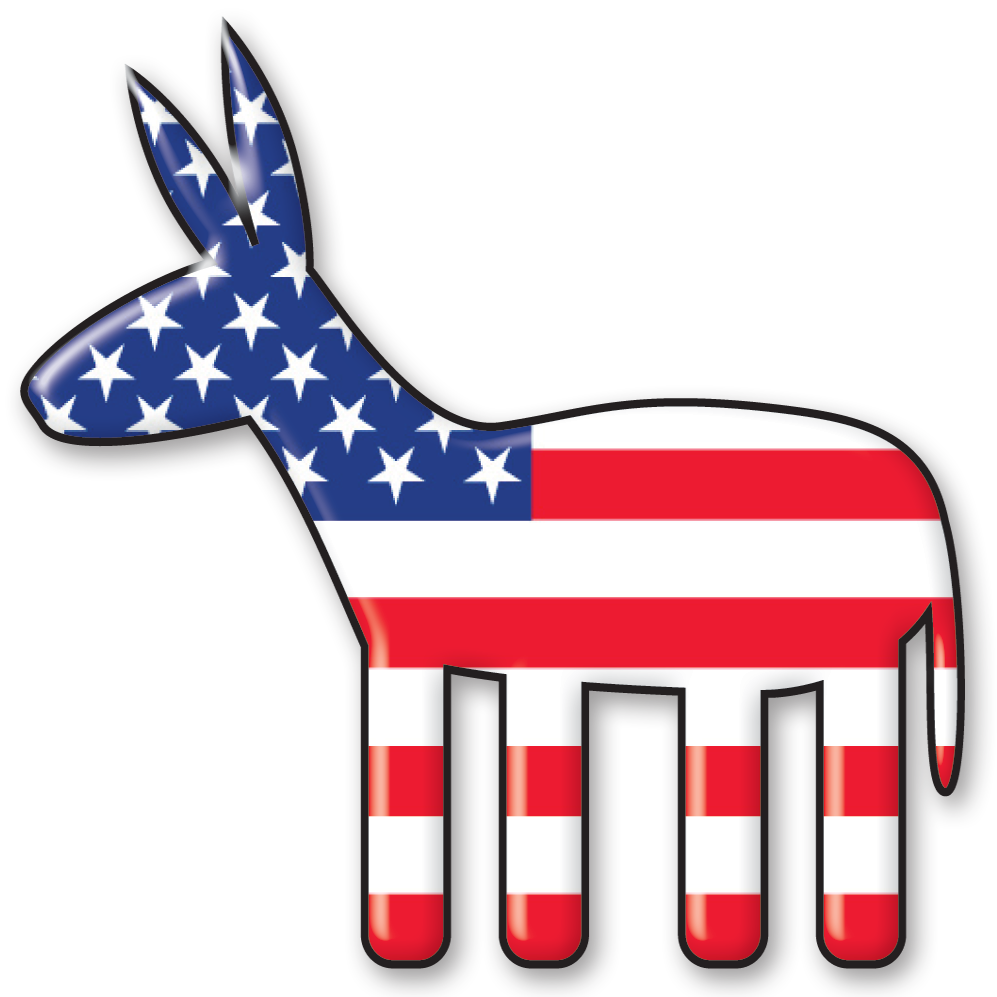

Like his father and grandfather, Edward Cox was a strong supporter of the Democratic Party. His views were typically expressed via editorials in his newspapers, and some editorials were reprinted by other publications. He was Blackford County's Democratic County Chairman in 1902. In July, 1914, under the administration of President Woodrow Wilson, Cox was appointed postmaster of Hartford City, and he was reappointed in 1919. (Edward's grandfather, Aaron Cox, had also been a postmaster.) For eight years, Cox was the representative of the Eleventh Congressional District on the Indiana Democratic state committee. He was also president of the Indiana Democratic Editorial Association in 1927.

Mr. Cox always participated in community affairs and was a member of numerous local organizations. He was one of the organizers of the local Kiwanis Club, and served as its first president. He was a Freemason, a member of the Mystic Shrine, and a member of the Knights of Pythias. He was also a Past Exalted Ruler of the Elks' lodge.

In addition to civic organizations, Cox was a member of the local Chamber of Commerce and one of its founders. He was a director of the Citizens State Bank of Hartford City, and served three terms on the local school board. During World War I, he was involved with patriotic activities such as the Thrift Savings Stamp campaign and the sale of government war bonds. Mr. Cox was a strong follower of local sports teams, and attended almost every home game of the local high school basketball team. He was president of the Hartford City Gymnasium Holding Company that raised funds to build a new gym for the school. He was also one of the organizers and founders of the Blackford Golf Club.

== Death ==
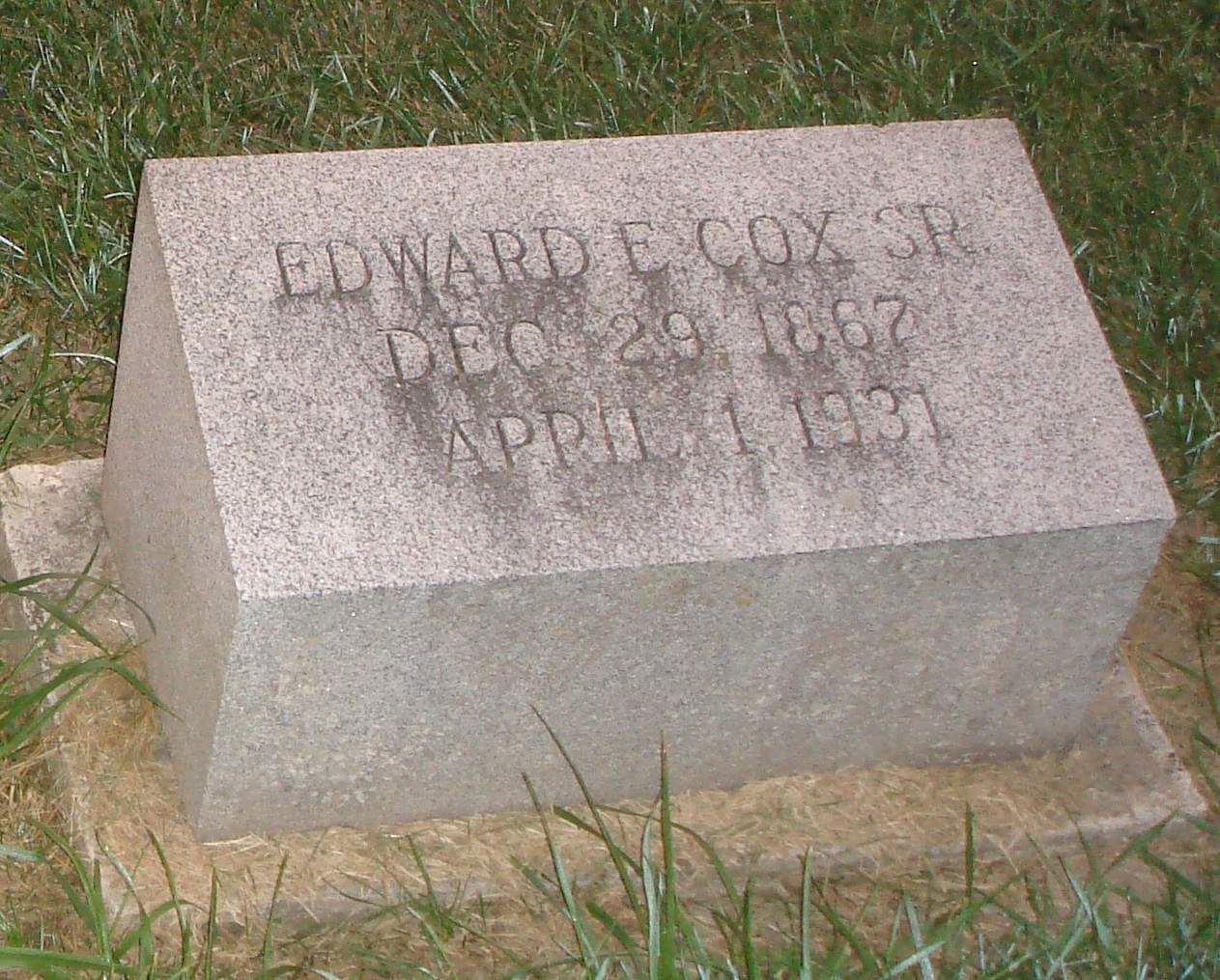
E.E. Cox's grave in Hartford City's IOOF cemetery

On the morning of April 1, 1931, Edward Everett Cox died from a severe heart attack suffered the night before. He had been ill for almost a week, but his illness had been kept quiet because it was thought he would recover. The town was surprised by a front page obituary in the Hartford City News that covered most of the page. Cox was considered one of the community's most well-known citizens, and had yet to reach retirement age at the time of his death. He was renowned not only within the community, but also statewide in politics. An obituary printed in nearby Kokomo, Indiana, described him as "prominent in Democratic state politics". In addition to his numerous accomplishments, his Hartford City obituary also described the man. It said, "Mr. Cox was a man of energy and a tireless worker. Success crowned nearly each adventure, whether from a business or political angle and he was held in the highest regard and esteem by all who knew him. To his newspaper and his printing business, he devoted much of his time and was beloved and admired by each and everyone of his employees. There were few who were not aided by his hand and direction, and each in turn sought to give to him the best that was available."
