= John V. Hadley =

American judge (c. 1839–1842–1915)

Justice of the Indiana Supreme Court
- In office January 2, 1899 – January 2, 1911
- Preceded by: James McCabe
- Succeeded by: Charles E. Cox

John Vestal Hadley (c. 1839–1842 – November 17, 1915) was an American lawyer, politician, judge, historian, and writer who served in the Indiana Senate and as a justice of the Indiana Supreme Court from January 2, 1899, to January 2, 1911. He served in various positions throughout the Civil War and was twice taken as a prisoner of war.

== Biography ==
John Hadley was born on a farm in Hendricks County, Indiana to a family of Quakers of Irish descent (specifically from County Meath) who moved to Plainfield, Indiana from Guilford County, North Carolina in 1822. His parents were Jonathan Hadley (who died in 1842) and Ara Hadley (née Carter, originally from Collinsville, Ohio).

Hadley attended a Quaker school in Plainfield. In 1859, he attended Butler University in Indianapolis, leaving after one year before to enlist in the Union Army following the outbreak of the Civil War. Hadley served in a non-combat capacity; as a Quaker, he was a conscientious objector due to his religion's doctrine of pacifism. After enlisting in Company B of the 7th Indiana Infantry Regiment, Hadley was sent to Camp Morton in Indianapolis for a short period of training and was appointed corporal. His regiment fought in West Virginia and Virginia. In 1862, he was promoted to sergeant before being wounded at the Second Battle of Bull Run and was briefly taken as a prisoner of war by Confederate soldiers before being let free. In 1863, he was appointed lieutenant on the staff of Brigadier General James Clay Rice. During the Battle of the Wilderness, Hadley was once again wounded and taken as a prisoner of war. He was transferred to four Confederate POW camps before ending up in Camp Sorghum in Columbia, South Carolina. He would remain in the prison for seven months (an experience he would recount in his bestselling book, Seven Months a Prisoner) before escaping and walking across the Blue Ridge Mountains to Knoxville, Tennessee where he found a Union camp. He was discharged in 1865. Returning to Hendricks County, Hadley married Mary Jane Hill, a woman he had been sending love letters to throughout the war. These letters were later published in 1963 in the Indiana Magazine of History.

In 1866, Hadley studied at the Law School of Indiana University in Bloomington. After being admitted to the bar, Hadley opened a private practice in Danville and had a successful start to his career by providing legal services to the members of his large family (there were two hundred Hadleys in Hendricks County at the time). A Republican, Hadley served in the Indiana Senate from 1869 to 1873, representing Hendricks and Putnam counties. In 1884, he was floated as a candidate for a seat in Congress, but he declined to run. In 1886, he was elected judge of Indiana's 19th Circuit Court. He was re-elected to the position in 1894 and presided over the widely publicized Hinshaw murder trial during this second term. His judicious and professional handling of a case that was monitored so closely by the press brought Hadley to the attention of the public, leading to his election to the Indiana Supreme Court.

Hadley became a justice of the Indiana Supreme Court in 1899, succeeding Justice James McCabe. He left the court in 1911 due to his failing health in old age. He was succeeded by Justice Charles E. Cox. In 1914, Hadley's book on the history of Hendricks County, History of Hendricks County, Indiana: Her People, Industries, and Institutions, was published.

As mentioned, Hadley married Mary Jane Hill after returning from war. They had three children; two sons and one daughter. Their son, Walter Gresham Hadley, served as an artillery captain in the American Expeditionary Force during the First World War.

Hadley died of the common cold at his home in Danville in 1915.

Political offices
Preceded by James McCabe	Justice of the Indiana Supreme Court; 1899–1911	Succeeded by Charles E. Cox
