= Charles Ray (Indiana judge) =

American judge (1829–1912)

Justice of the Indiana Supreme Court
- In office January 3, 1865 – January 3, 1871
- Preceded by: Samuel E. Perkins
- Succeeded by: Samuel Hamilton Buskirk

Charles Andrew Ray (September 3, 1829 – March 6, 1912) was an American lawyer, politician, and judge who served as a justice of the Indiana Supreme Court from January 3, 1865, to January 3, 1871.

== Early life and education ==
Ray was born in Indianapolis, Indiana in 1829 to James Mitchel and Maria Rebecca Ray (née Coe). James Mitchel Ray, born in Caldwell, New Jersey, the son of a Scottish immigrant from Kippen, had a long career in Indiana law and governance, serving as Clerk of the Marion County Circuit Court and as Cashier of the Bank of Indiana. James M. Ray was also active within the Presbyterian Church, serving as Superintendent of a Presbyterian school in Indianapolis before becoming an Elder of the Presbyterian Church in 1830 and then a member of the Joint Committee on the Reunion of the Presbyterian Church. James Ray faced financial ruin after a disastrous mining investment, but he was able to get a well-paying position with the Treasury Department in Washington, D.C.

From 1848 to 1849, Charles Ray attended Brown University in Providence, Rhode Island, but was forced to leave Brown early after his father became ill. In 1849, he was awarded an honorary degree of LL.D by Indiana State University. He returned to school from 1851 to 1852, obtaining an actual degree from a law school in Cambridge, Massachusetts. Returning to Indianapolis, Ray formed a law partnership with a former judge, James Morrison, remaining at his private practice until 1861.

== Career ==
In 1861, Ray was appointed judge of Indiana's 12th Common Pleas District by Governor Oliver P. Morton (a good friend of Ray's). In 1862, he was elected to the same position for a full, four-year term.

In 1864, during a statewide Republican landslide, Ray and three other Republican judges (Jehu Elliott, James S. Frazer, and Robert Gregory) were elected to the Indiana Supreme Court, replacing all four of the court's Democratic justices. Ray succeeded Justice Samuel E. Perkins. Ray, Elliott, Frazer, and Gregory were collectively known as "the Lincoln four". The most famous case the court heard during Ray's time on the bench was Smith v. Moody, which resulted in the Lincoln four unanimously ruling to strike down Article 13 of the Indiana Constitution, which barred African Americans and multiracial individuals from settling in Indiana or entering into a contract. Ray was renominated to his seat on the court at the state Republican convention, but was defeated in the election. He was succeeded to the court in 1871 by Justice Samuel Hamilton Buskirk.

In 1872, Ray traveled to Belfast, United Kingdom on legal business. He spent the next several months travelling Europe with his daughter, Florence. In 1874, Ray moved to Washington, D.C., where he practiced law with Thomas W. Bartley, former governor of Ohio and former justice of the Ohio Supreme Court. In 1881, Postmaster General Thomas Lemuel James appointed Ray law clerk of the Post Office Department. He resigned in 1883 and returned to practice law in Indianapolis.

Ray moved to California sometime in the 1870s and served as a judge there before returning to Indianapolis. Additionally, he became associate editor of the legal publication, Western Reporter, published by the Lawyers Co-Operative Publishing Company in Rochester, New York.

In 1906, Ray was named as the attorney of record in a case before the United States Supreme Court.

== Personal life ==
Ray married Avife Laura Amelia Mills in 1849.

Ray died in Washington, D.C. in 1912, at the age of 82, and was interred in Easton, Pennsylvania.

Political offices
Preceded by Samuel E. Perkins	Justice of the Indiana Supreme Court; 1865–1871	Succeeded by Samuel Hamilton Buskirk
