= John T. McKinney =

American judge (1785–1837)

John Taliaferro McKinney (March 18, 1785 – March 4, 1837) was a justice of the Indiana Supreme Court from January 28, 1831, to March 4, 1837.

Born in Caroline County, Virginia, McKinney attended Charlotte Hall Military Academy in Maryland, and "apparently saw military service during the War of 1812", and was indicated in one biography to have eventually held the rank of general, although "no source for this rank has been found". McKinney read law to gain admission to the bar in Kentucky in 1815. At some point thereafter he moved to Indiana, where he was admitted to the Franklin County bar on March 3, 1822, becoming a prosecuting attorney in October of that year, and being commissioned as a captain in the Indiana Militia that same month. McKinney gained a strong reputation as an attorney. In one instance, he and an opposing attorney were fined five dollars for fist-fighting in the courtroom, and were each fined five dollars.

McKinney entered politics, serving two terms in the Indiana House of Representatives in the mid-1820s, and three terms in the Indiana Senator, from 1828 to 1831. On January 28, 1831, Governor James B. Ray, who was friends with McKinney through their time practicing law before the same courts, appointed McKinney to a seat on the Indiana Supreme Court. At the time of his appointment, McKinney already suffered from tuberculosis, from which he died while still serving on the court, in Brookville.

Political offices
Preceded by Jesse Lynch Holman	Justice of the Indiana Supreme Court; 1831–1837	Succeeded by Jeremiah Sullivan
