= Justice Ellett =

Justice Ellett may refer to:

- A. H. Ellett (1898–1986), associate justice of the Utah Supreme Court
- Henry T. Ellett (1812–1887), associate justice of the Supreme Court of Mississippi

== See also ==
- Justice Elliott (disambiguation)
