= Judge Elliott =

Judge Elliott may refer to:

- J. Robert Elliott (1910–2006), judge of the United States District Court for the Middle District of Georgia
- James Douglas Elliott (1859–1933), judge of the United States District Court for the District of South Dakota
- Samantha D. Elliott (born 1975), judge of the United States District Court for the District of New Hampshire

== See also ==
- Justice Elliott (disambiguation)
