= James McCabe (judge) =

American judge (1844–1911)

James McCabe (July 4, 1844 – March 23, 1911) was a justice of the Indiana Supreme Court from January 2, 1893, to January 2, 1899.

Born in Darke County, Ohio, his father was a farmer, and McCabe engaged in that occupation until reached adulthood. He studied law while teaching school, and began practicing shortly after reaching the age of majority.

McCabe was described as "a lifelong Democrat" who was "prominent in his party", as evinced by a personal friendship with William Jennings Bryan. He was twice nominated by the Democratic Party for a seat in the United States House of Representatives, but was defeated both times. In 1892 he became candidate for position of Judge of the Supreme Court, and was elected, serving until 1899.

In 1863 he married Serena Van Cleve of CrawfordsvIIle, who survived him. McCabe died of apoplexy at his home near Williamsport, Indiana.

Political offices
Preceded by Byron Elliott	Justice of the Indiana Supreme Court; 1893–1899	Succeeded by John V. Hadley
