= John T. Scott (Indiana judge) =

American judge

Justice of the Indiana Supreme Court
- In office December 29, 1879 – December 29, 1881
- Appointed by: James D. Williams (Indiana governor)
- Preceded by: Samuel E. Perkins
- Succeeded by: Byron Elliott

John T. Scott (May 6, 1831 – December 29, 1891) was an American lawyer and judge from Terre Haute, Indiana. Scott served as a justice of the Indiana Supreme Court from December 29, 1879, to January 5, 1881.

== Biography ==
=== Early life, education, and career ===
Scott was born Glasgow, Kentucky in 1831. He attended local public schools in Glasgow until age fourteen, when he became an apprentice harnessmaker. In 1850, at age 19, Scott ran away from home and his apprenticeship to attend Franklin College in Franklin, Tennessee, where he studied Latin, Greek, mathematics, English, and rhetoric.

Scott moved to Indiana in 1853, where he worked as a surveyor on the railroad between Indianapolis and Decatur, Illinois.

Scott's law career began when set up a private law practice in Montezuma. In 1860, he was elected to serve as a judge in the 10th Indiana Common Pleas District. In 1862, Scott was re-elected to the position and moved to Terre Haute. He returned to private practice after his second term until 1868, when he was elected to the Common Pleas Court of Vigo County. He was re-elected to the position in 1872, but only ended up serving a year, as the court was abolished in 1873.

In 1867, Scott oversaw the laying of tram tracks from downtown Terre Haute to the city's newly opened fairgrounds.

=== Judicial service ===
In 1875, Scott was appointed to the Board of Trustees of Indiana State University (then called Indiana State Normal School) in Terre Haute. He would serve on the board until 1879, when Indiana Governor James D. Williams appointed Scott to the Indiana Supreme Court following the death of Justice Samuel E. Perkins. During Scott's term, the Supreme Court heard the important case of State v. Swift, which tackled a controversy over the approval by voters of several amendments to the Indiana state constitution. Scott dissented from Justice Horace Biddle's majority opinion on the case. In 1881, Scott ran for re-election to the Supreme Court, but was defeated. He was succeeded in the court by Justice Byron Elliott. Scott's time on the Supreme Court was brief, serving for only around thirteen months on the court.

=== Personal life and death ===
Scott married Rebecca Jones of Edgar County, Illinois while in Montezuma. The couple would have five children together. Their daughter, Sarah Scott, became a prominent educator and is the namesake of Sarah Scott Middle School in Terre Haute. Scott's son, Charles, practiced both law and engineering and served as Terre Haute's building inspector. Another son, George, had a long legal career in Terre Haute.

After leaving the Supreme Court, Scott returned to his private practice in Terre Haute, where he would work until his death. Following his death, a committee to commemorate his life and service was assembled, which included such prominent members as former Secretary of the Navy, Richard W. Thompson, and U.S. Senator from Indiana, Daniel W. Voorhees.

Political offices
Preceded by Samuel E. Perkins	Justice of the Indiana Supreme Court; 1879-1891	Succeeded by Byron Elliott
