= Andrew Davison (judge) =

American judge (1800–1871)

Andrew Davison (September 15, 1800 – February 4, 1871) was a justice of the Indiana Supreme Court from January 3, 1853, to January 3, 1865.

== Biography ==
Born in Franklin County, Pennsylvania, Davison attended Jefferson College in Canonsburg, Pennsylvania. He studied law with Thomas H. Crawford, and in 1825 moved to Indiana, seeking a place to recruit his health, and with the hope of finding a favorable location to follow his profession. He gained admission to the bar at Greensburg, Indiana, on September 26, 1825, and entered the practice of law there, "in a short time becoming a leader in his profession".

Davison was elected from the Second district in 1852, defeating over Charles Dewey, and taking his seat on the Supreme bench of Indiana on January 3, 1853. He was re-elected in the fall of 1858, and continued in office until January 2, 1865, a total of twelve years.

== Personal life and death ==
On April 15, 1839, he married the widow, Mrs. Elgin Test. They had one child, Joseph R. Davison.

Davison died in Greensburg at the age of 70, six years after retiring from the Supreme bench.

Political offices
Preceded by Isaac Blackford	Justice of the Indiana Supreme Court; 1853–1865	Succeeded by Jehu Elliott
