= Samuel E. Perkins =

American judge (1811–1879)

Samuel Elliott Perkins
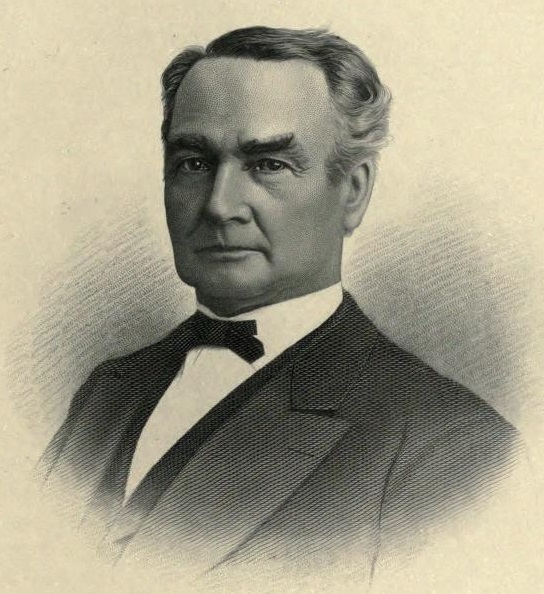
- From 1884's History of Indianapolis and Marion County, Indiana

Justice of the Indiana Supreme Court
- In office January 21, 1846 – January 3, 1865
- Preceded by: Jeremiah Sullivan
- Succeeded by: Charles Ray
- Nominated by: James Whitcomb
- In office January 1, 1877 – December 17, 1879
- Preceded by: John Pettit
- Succeeded by: John T. Scott

Personal details
- Born: December 6, 1811 Brattleboro, Vermont, US
- Died: December 17, 1879 (aged 68)
- Resting place: Crown Hill Cemetery and Arboretum, Section 12, Lot 6

Samuel Elliott Perkins (December 6, 1811 – December 17, 1879) was an American lawyer, newspaper editor, and judge from the state of Indiana. He served as a Justice on the Indiana Supreme Court from January 21, 1846, to January 3, 1865, and again from January 1, 1877, until his death on December 17, 1879.

== Biography ==
Born in Brattleboro, Vermont in 1811, Perkins was orphaned by age five. He went to live with family friends in Massachusetts and began studying law under an attorney while living in rural New York. He arrived in Indiana in 1836, where he studied under an attorney in Richmond before establishing his own legal firm in Richmond.

Perkins was a staunch supporter of the Democratic Party. He edited a pro-Democratic newspaper which criticized the state's Republican government for failures regarding canal construction and other internal improvement projects.

Perkins briefly served as the prosecuting attorney of Wayne County.

Democratic Governor James Whitcomb nominated Perkins to the Indiana Supreme Court to replace Justice Jeremiah Sullivan. Perkins finally was able to join the court after his nomination was blocked by the state senate on two separate occasions. Indiana adopted a new constitution while Perkins was on the court; he is the only judge to have the distinction of serving on both Indiana Supreme Courts created by the state's first and second constitutions. Perkins remained on the Supreme Court until 1865. He was succeeded by Justice Charles Ray.

In 1857, Perkins taught law at Butler University (then Northwestern Christian University). In 1870, he joined the faculty of Indiana University's Law Department. In 1872, he left IU to serve three years as a judge in the Marion County superior court. Perkins also attempted to establish a law school in Indianapolis with David McDonald, a United States District Court Judge of the United States District Court for the District of Indiana.

Perkins was a partner at a prominent firm in Indianapolis that became the modern firm of Baker & Daniels. He practiced law there with Oscar B. Hord (later Indiana Attorney General), Thomas A. Hendricks (later Governor of Indiana and U.S. Vice President), Conrad Baker (another future Governor), and Abram W. Hendricks (Indiana General Assembly member). Hord married Perkins's daughter, Mary Josephine Perkins.

Perkins returned to the court in 1877, succeeding Justice John Pettit, but died shortly after in 1879. He was succeeded by Justice John T. Scott. Altogether, he served a total of twenty-two years on the Supreme Court.

Political offices
| Preceded by Jeremiah Sullivan; John Pettit | Justice of the Indiana Supreme Court; 1846–1865; 1877–1879 | Succeeded by Charles Ray; John Scott |
