= Byron Elliott =

American judge (1835–1913)

Byron Kosciusko Elliott
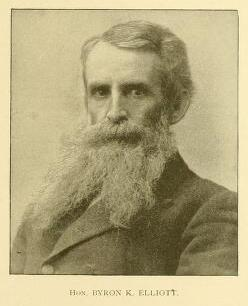

Justice of the Indiana Supreme Court
- In office January 3, 1881 – January 2, 1893
- Preceded by: John T. Scott
- Succeeded by: James McCabe

Personal details
- Resting place: Crown Hill Cemetery and Arboretum, Section 16, Lot 203

Byron Kosciusko Elliott (September 4, 1835 – April 19, 1913) was an American lawyer, judge, and jurist from the state of Indiana. Elliott served as the city attorney of Indianapolis, a judge of the Marion County criminal and superior court, and a justice of the Indiana Supreme Court from January 3, 1881, to January 2, 1893.

== Biography ==
Born in Hamilton, Butler County, Ohio, Elliott was educated in the Marion County Seminary, where he was classmates with William Dean Howells.

Elliot came to Indianapolis in 1850 with his father, William J. Elliott. Studying in a local law office, he was admitted to the bar in 1858. In 1859, he was elected city attorney of Indianapolis. Initially a Democrat supporting Stephen A. Douglas in the 1860 United States presidential election, Elliott switched to the Republican Party at the outbreak of the American Civil War. Elliott served in the war for four years, attaining the rank of adjutant-general on the staff of General Robert H. Milroy. After the war ended, Elliott returned to Indianapolis and resumed serving as city attorney. In 1870, Elliott was elected as a judge of the Marion County criminal court without seeking the office, and while away from the city. Elliott was elected back to the office of Indianapolis city attorney in 1872. In 1876, he was elected to the Marion County superior court. He was re-elected to the position, but declined it to accept the Republican nomination for a position on the Indiana Supreme Court.

Elliott was elected to the Indiana Supreme Court in 1880, taking office the following January and serving two six-year terms before his retirement. He was elected to replace Justice John T. Scott. During his time on the Supreme Court, Elliott and his fellow Justices dealt with many cases regarding interpretation of the Indiana state constitution. Elliott was a leading advocate in the court of the separation of powers and judicial independence. Elliott authored numerous influential opinions in a number of cases that overturned legislative efforts to interfere in the court activities—for instance, the Court at this time overturned legislation that established the offices of commissioners, appointed by the General Assembly, who were to assist the Justices in their duties. At the same time, Elliott blocked judicial efforts to intervene in other branches of government, authoring an opinion in a case regarding succession to the state's lieutenant governorship which stated that the court's interference in the matter of succession was overstepping its constitutional authority. Elliott also authored an influential opinion in support of local taxation to support public education during a case challenging related legislation recently passed by the General Assembly. Elliott wrote 1,632 opinions during his tenure on the Supreme Court. His opinions and legal philosophy were influenced by his favorite writers; Aristotle, John Locke, and Immanuel Kant. Elliott ran for another term on the Supreme Court in 1892, but was defeated. He was succeeded by Justice James McCabe.

After leaving the Supreme Court, Elliott entered into a law practice with his son, William F. Elliott, with whom he "built up one of the largest practices in the state". During this time, Elliott also wrote several law books which were "accepted as authorities throughout the United States". Elliott also co-authored several books with his son. William F. Elliott became a successful lawyer himself and published a number of influential books, treatises, and articles about law.

Elliott was also a lecturer at the Central Law School of Indianapolis and at the law schools of DePauw University and Butler University (then called Northwestern Christian University). Elliott was later elected president of the Indiana Law School of Indianapolis.

Elliott married Harriot A. Talbot in 1855. They had two children, including the aforementioned William F. Elliott. Through his father, Byron Elliott is related to Jehu Elliott, another Indiana Supreme Court justice.

Elliott died in his home in Indianapolis at the age of 78. Linda Gugin, professor emeritus of political science at Indiana University Southeast described Elliott as "one of the most intellectually gifted and prolific judges to sit on the Indiana Supreme Court."

== Works, with William Frederick Elliot ==
- A Treatise on the Law of Roads and Streets (1890)
- The Work of the Advocate: A Practical Treatise Containing Suggestions for Preparation and Trial, Including a System of Rules for the Examination of Witnesses and the Argument of Questions of Law and Fact (1894)
- A Treatise on the Law of Railroads: Containing a Consideration of the Organization, Status and Powers of Railroad Corporations, and of the Rights and Liabilities Incident to the Location, Construction and Operation of Railroads; Together with Their Duties, Rights and Liabilities as Carriers, Including Both Street and Interurban Railways (1897)

Political offices
Preceded by John T. Scott	Justice of the Indiana Supreme Court; 1881–1893	Succeeded by James McCabe
