= Jehu Elliott =

American judge (1813–1876)

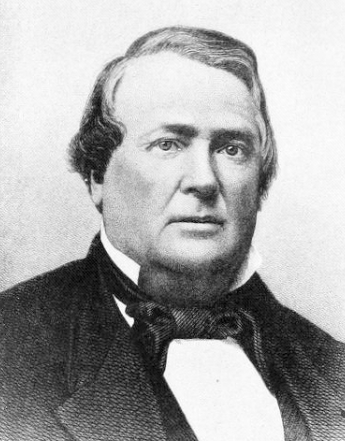

Justice of the Indiana Supreme Court
- In office January 3, 1865 – January 3, 1871
- Preceded by: Andrew Davison
- Succeeded by: Alexander Downey

Personal details
- Born: February 7, 1813 Richmond, Indiana, US
- Died: February 12, 1876 (aged 63) New Castle, Indiana, US
- Party: Liberal Republican; Republican
- Spouse: Hanna Branson (m. 1833)

Jehu Tindle Elliott (February 7, 1813 – February 12, 1876) was an American lawyer, politician, businessman, and judge who served in the Indiana House of Representatives, the Indiana Senate and as a justice of the Indiana Supreme Court from January 3, 1865, to January 3, 1871. He also served as the President of the Cincinnati, Logansport & Chicago Railway, securing funding for the construction of a railroad in Central Indiana.

== Biography ==
=== Early life, education, and career ===
Elliott was born in Richmond, Indiana to an abolitionist, Quaker family from Guilford County, North Carolina. One of twelve children, Elliott grew up poor, having to make his own shoes as a child. In 1823, Elliott's family moved to New Castle in Henry County, building and living in their own log cabin. Elliott was intermittently educated at local country schools. He eventually became a school teacher, teaching for two years before going to Centerville to study law with Martin R. Ray, a prominent local lawyer. In 1833, at age twenty, he was admitted to the bar.

Between 1834 and 1844, Elliott was elected to a variety of different offices. He served as Henry County Treasurer (1834–1839), Assistant Secretary for the Indiana House of Representatives (1835–1837), prosecutor for the Sixth Circuit (1839–1844, with the Sixth Circuit encompassing Henry, Delaware, Fayette, Grant, Randolph, Rush, Union, and Wayne counties). Additionally, Elliott served a single, three-year term in the Indiana Senate starting in 1839.

=== Judicial service and railway leadership ===
Elliott was elected by the General Assembly to the position of Sixth Circuit judge twice, first in 1844 and then again in 1851.

In 1851, Elliott resigned the office of Sixth Circuit judge to become President of the Cincinnati, Logansport & Chicago Railway. He traveled to New York to find businessmen willing to invest in the construction of a railroad that ran from Logansport through Kokomo, Elwood, Anderson, and New Castle before terminating in Richmond. New Yorkers largely viewed Indiana as a rural backwater in no need of rail transport, but Elliott was able to convince get funding for the project. According to a potentially apocryphal tale in Fred Cavinder's 1990 book, Amazing Tales from Indiana, Elliott charmed the eastern businessman by telling them a humorous story about how Hoosiers like to play an instrument called a "swinette", created by stuffing pigs into the compartments of a long box and played by plucking their tails to cause them to squeal. Later, when the Logansport-Richmond railroad was built, the first engine to travel across it was named Swinette and had a picture of Elliott carrying a pig under his arm painted on its side. Elliott left the railroad industry and returned to public service in 1855, when he was elected to the position of judge of the 10th Circuit (comprising Henry, Randolph, Wayne, and Jay counties).

Elliott was elected to the Indiana Supreme Court in 1864 to succeed Justice Andrew Davison, winning his seat in a Republican landslide that forced out all four Democratic Justices on the court. Elliott and the other three new Republican justices elected in 1864 (James S. Frazer, Charles Ray, and Robert Gregory) were known collectively as "the Lincoln Four". During Elliott's time on the bench, the court heard the famous case of Smith v. Moody, which ended with the Supreme Court (in a unanimous ruling) striking down Article 13 of the Indiana Constitution, which barred African Americans and multiracial individuals from settling in Indiana or entering into contracts in the state. After serving one term on the bench, Elliott left the court in 1871 and returned to his private law practice. He was succeeded by Justice Alexander Downey.

According to the Indianapolis Journal, Elliott—at the time a Liberal Republican—sought the Democratic nomination for Lieutenant Governor in the 1872 election.

=== Personal life and death ===
Elliott married Hanna Branson in 1833. Their son, William Henry Elliott (born 1844), was a lawyer, the owner of the newspaper, the Newcastle Courier, and a member of the U.S. Navy who served in the Spanish–American War and helped organized the postal system of Puerto Rico after the conflict.

Through his father, Abraham Elliott, Jehu Elliott is related to Byron Elliott, another Indiana Supreme Court justice.

Elliott died in New Castle in 1876.

Political offices
Preceded by Andrew Davison	Justice of the Indiana Supreme Court; 1865–1871	Succeeded by Alexander Downey
