= Charles E. Cox =

American judge

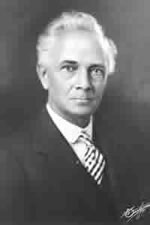
- Indiana Supreme Court portrait, circa 1911

Indiana Supreme Court Justice
- In office January 2, 1911 – January 1, 1917
- Preceded by: John V. Hadley
- Succeeded by: Lawson M. Harvey

Personal details
- Born: Charles Elbridge Cox; February 21, 1860 Hamilton County, Indiana
- Died: February 3, 1936 (aged 75) Indianapolis, Indiana
- Resting place: Crown Hill Cemetery and Arboretum, Section 39, Lot 87
- Party: Democrat
- Spouse: Emma M. Cooley
- Children: 1 daughter, 2 sons
- Relatives: Hon. Millard F. Cox (brother); Hon. Jabez T. Cox (brother); Edward Everett Cox (nephew)
- Occupation: Lawyer

Charles Elbridge Cox (February 21, 1860 – February 3, 1936) was an American lawyer and judge who became the 55th justice of the Indiana Supreme Court, serving from 1911 to 1917. Elected as a Democrat in the Fall of 1910, he was Chief Justice by the end of his six-year term. The "Marshall Constitution" case and the "Technical Institute" case were among the important decisions made by the court during his tenure. As a judge in the Indiana Supreme Court and in lower courts, he never had a decision reversed.

Cox began studying law in 1877 while a law clerk for judge William E. Niblack, 27th justice of the Indiana Supreme Court. Cox came from a family of lawyers and judges, as brothers Jabez T. Cox and Millard F. Cox also practiced law and spent time as judges in Indiana.

In private practice, Cox gained national attention assisting the prosecutor in the 1925 trial of D. C. Stephenson for the death of Madge Oberholtzer. In addition to private practice and his tenure on the Indiana Supreme Court, Cox's legal career also included librarian of the Indiana State Law Library, Marion County Deputy Prosecuting Attorney, and city judge of Indianapolis.

== Identity and origins ==
Cox's ancestors came to America when the land was still a British colony. Cox was a member of the Sons of the American Revolution, having documented family members who fought against the British in the American Revolutionary War. This particular branch of the Cox family was originally Quaker, and operated a mill on the Deep River in North Carolina, near the area that eventually became the city of Greensboro.

A distaste for slavery eventually caused many Quakers to move north. Members of the Cox family moved to Ohio and Tennessee. Cox's father, Aaron Cox, was an Ohio farmer who moved to Hamilton County, Indiana, in 1850. In addition to his farm, Aaron Cox had an interest in politics and served as Noblesville's postmaster.

Charles E. Cox was the youngest of the three sons of Aaron and Mary (Skaggs) Cox that would become judges in Indiana. He was born on February 21, 1860, at the family farm in Hamilton County. Six years later, the family moved within the county to Noblesville, Indiana. Charles first attended school in Noblesville. Another six years later, the family moved approximately 18 miles (29 km) north to Tipton, Indiana. By the age of fifteen years, Cox had completed the Tipton High School curriculum. He began his working career as deputy auditor for Tipton County, and he worked there for one year before spending two years working on the family farm.

== Legal career ==
In 1879, Charles E. Cox began the study of law as he clerked for Indiana Supreme Court Judge William E. Niblack in Indianapolis, Indiana. Because of Niblack's impaired eyesight, Cox was employed by the judge to read records, briefs, and law books. Cox also became assistant librarian of the Indiana State Law Library at that time. In September 1883, the judges of the Indiana Supreme Court appointed Cox librarian, and he held that position until September 1889. During his time as librarian, he completed his legal education and was admitted to the bar.

Charles Cox began practicing law in Indianapolis in November 1889, joining the law firm (Cox & Beck) of his brother Millard F. Cox and Henry A. Beck. He formed a partnership with John J. Rochford in 1891, which continued until 1895. Cox was also appointed deputy prosecuting attorney of Marion County in 1891, and he served in that position until he became city judge of Indianapolis. Having been elected in the fall of 1894, Cox was city judge from 1895 through 1899. He served for two terms, but refused a third nomination. Afterwards, he opened an office where he practiced law.

=== Indiana Supreme Court ===
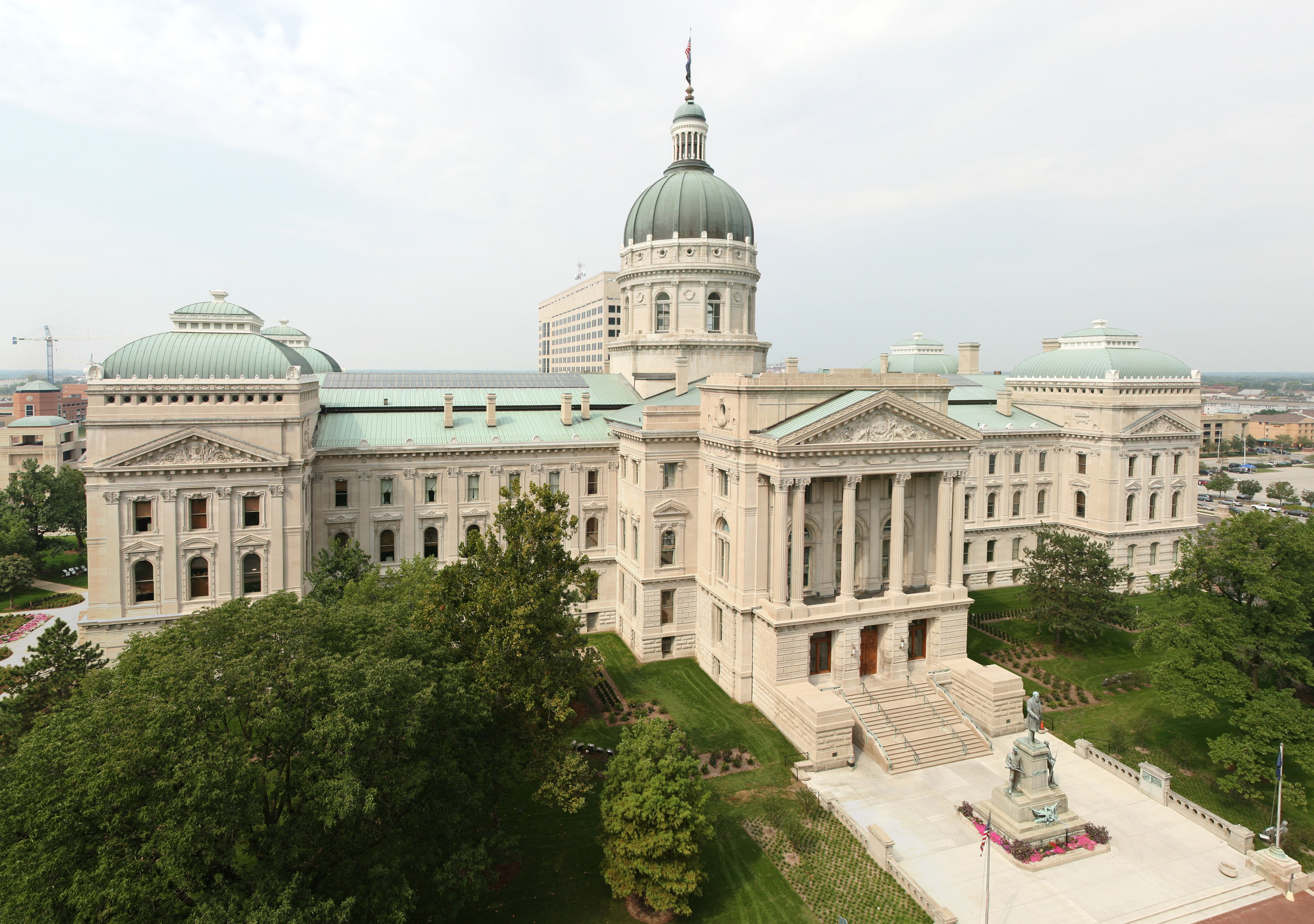

Cox was seated on the Indiana Supreme Court on January 2, 1911, after winning the election in 1910 as a Democrat. Many important cases were decided during Cox's term, and he wrote the opinions for two Indiana Supreme Court cases that merit attention. First, the court agreed (in a split decision) with an injunction in the "Marshall Constitution" case (Ellingham vs. Dye) that the state legislature, working with Democratic Governor Thomas R. Marshall, did not have the power to propose both a state constitution and the method to adopt it. Cox wrote the majority opinion, which was more than 100 pages long. The decision was split, with Cox siding with the two Republican members of the Indiana Supreme Court while the other two Democrats dissented.

The "Technical Institute" (Richards v. Wilson) case is the other trial typically mentioned as significant during Cox's tenure. This complicated case concerned charities, trusts, and the intent of donors. Both the majority (written by Cox) and dissenting opinions (written by associate justice John W. Spencer) in this case were lengthy. By the end of Cox's term, he had become chief justice of the Indiana Supreme Court. He was described as “one of the ablest of the many able jurists of the State”.

=== Post court ===
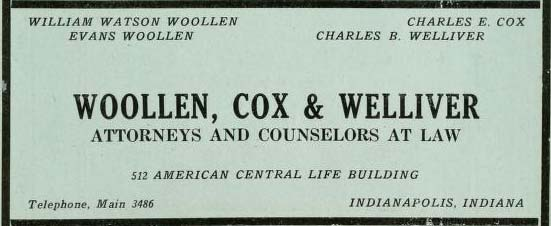
A 1920 Blue Book Advertisement

Although Cox voted against the Democrats in the "Marshall Constitution" case, he was respected enough to still be selected as a Democratic candidate for re-election in 1916. However, Cox did not win re-election, as the entire ticket of Democrats lost in the state election. He practiced law in Indianapolis, and a city directory for 1918 shows that he maintained an office in the City Trust Building. He eventually joined the law firm of Woollen, Woollen & Welliver, and the firm was renamed Wollen, Cox & Welliver. Cox lived in downtown Indianapolis (Center Township) with his wife and two sons. In 1924, he was elected president of the Indianapolis Bar Association.

During 1925, Cox was involved in a trial that received national attention. The Noblesville, Indiana, trial is known as the “D. C. Stephenson” case, and involved wealthy and influential Ku Klux Klan leader D. C. Stephenson and the brutal rape and death of Madge Oberholtzer. Stephenson was well connected politically, and was famous for claiming “I am the law in Indiana”. Cox was one of the chief prosecutors in the trial, and was quoted in the New York Times denouncing Stephenson as one who “holds himself above the law” and as a “destroyer of the virtue of women”. The details of the rape outraged many members of the Klan, causing them to leave that organization. Stephenson was found guilty of second degree murder. Unable to get the pardon he expected, a vengeful Stephenson began naming politicians who had helped him gain power, resulting in jail time for the Indianapolis mayor and the resignation of other government officials.

By 1930, Cox had moved to a country estate and farm on the northeast side of Indianapolis in Lawrence Township. A grandfather by that time, his household included himself, his wife, one of his sons and wife, a grandson, and a domestic assistant. Cox was still practicing law with Charles B. Welliver as late as 1932.

== Death ==
By the time he was 75 years old, Cox had been married over 50 years. He had three grown children and four grandchildren. He was a member of the First Congregational Church, Sons of the American Revolution, and the Indiana Democratic Club. Cox still maintained an office in the Insurance Building in Indianapolis despite his advanced age. A book described him “as an attorney one of the ablest, as a judge recognized by the people of all parties as one of the best jurists who ever sat as a member of the Supreme Court of the state of Indiana.”

On February 3, 1936, Cox became ill while at his office, and died that evening at St. Vincent Hospital. The news of his death spread quickly throughout the state, and on the next day his picture was on the front page of the local newspaper in Indianapolis. Cox is buried at Crown Hill Cemetery in Indianapolis (Section 39, Lot 87).

== See also ==
- List of justices of the Indiana Supreme Court
