= Ku Klux Klan Konclaves at Buckeye Lake =

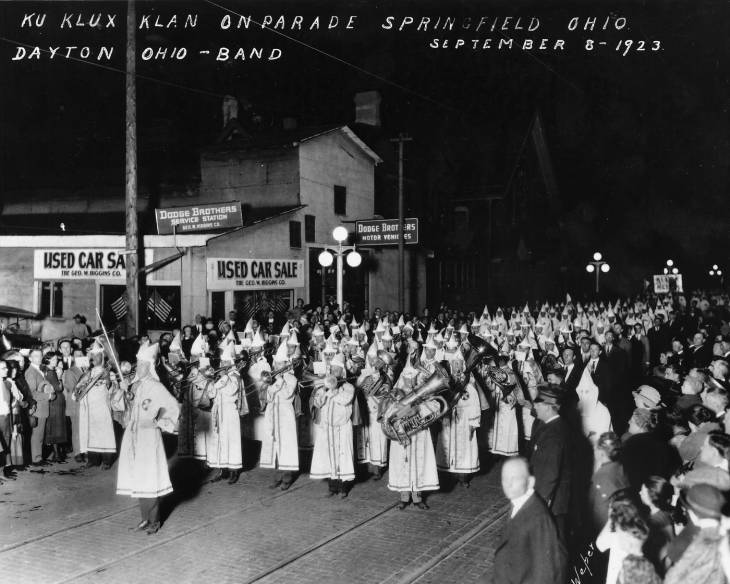
KKK on parade in Springfield, Ohio, September 8, 1923. This parade took place just a few months after the 1923 Konclave at Buckeye Lake. Resembles what a Klan procession would have looked like in this era.

The Ku Klux Klan, a prominent white supremacist group in the United States, held two major gatherings at Buckeye Lake, Ohio in 1923 and 1925. These "Konclaves" would later be noted as two of the most significant in the group's history. The number of attendees per gathering ranged between 75,000 and 100,000 people. Prominent figures of the Ku Klux Klan spoke at both events, and large numbers of people were inducted as new members of the Klan. The meetings concluded with no major incidents, despite the KKK being categorized as a hate group and having a history of violence. The success of each of these meetings led to a rise in political strength and influence for the Klan. Local political candidates with public Klan support easily won the mayoral elections in places such as Newark, Ohio.

== Ku Klux Klan and the 1920s ==
The popularity of the Ku Klux Klan surged in the state of Ohio, much like the rest of the nation, in the 1920s. This trend was caused, in part, by reactions against the exodus of Black Americans from the American South to other regions and an influx of European Americans to the United States. In addition to white supremacy, the Ku Klux Klan billed itself as a defender of Protestant moral values and fostered prejudice against Catholics and Jewish people.

Academics who have studied the Ku Klux Klan have noted that the rise of the KKK in the 1920s was at a time of a lot of societal turns. The Klan gained members as a result of the rapid changes. For example, during this time period, there was an economic shift driven by technological innovation. The Klan targeted geographical locations, especially rural communities, that were left out of the technology-driven economic growth and mass production occurring in larger cities.

In the 1920s, the increasing participation of women in the workforce and their recent right to vote encouraged the Klan to expand its membership to include women. The Ku Klux Klan established chapters for women, some of which were just as popular and had as much involvement as men's capters. This allowed the Ku Klux Klan to strengthen its numbers, especially as women formed a new voting bloc.

== The Konclaves ==
=== 1923 ===
The 1923 Konclave was an enormous gathering, with more than 75,000 attendees and many speeches and events throughout the day. The Imperial Wizard of the Ku Klux Klan, Hiram Wesley Evans, was in attendance. In the time leading up to the meeting, there was a poster with the title “Call of the Klan” campaigning for the event that read “Klansmen From All States Invited to See Ohio Klux.” There were guides in cloaks and hoods at different points near Buckeye Lake who helped direct attendees. The roads leading toward the lake were packed, and locals reported that all the hotels in the area were full. D.C. Stephenson spoke, along with many other important and nationally recognized Klan members. There was also an induction ceremony with three live bands playing “Onward Christian Soldiers” and three enormous crosses, the largest of which was set ablaze. This ceremony initiated approximately 1,700 new Klansmen. The finale of the event was a fireworks show with an American flag overlaid with the letters “KKK.” There were no incident reports save for one fatality, an old Klansman who suffered from a heart attack due to the heat.

=== 1925 ===
The success of the 1923 Konclave inspired another one to be held two years later. The 1925 Konclave at Buckeye Lake was one of the biggest Klan meetings in history, with attendance nearing 100,000. This event also carried on with no incidents, and once again, many national Klan leaders spoke. A major topic for this meeting was the Klan's denouncement of evolutionary science, particularly in light of the Scopes trial that had occurred earlier that year. This Konclave lasted four days, and there were various weddings carried out, along with a skit on “the American ‘Sodom and Gomorrah’". A newspaper article from the Cleveland Plain Dealer mentioned a marriage ceremony between two attendees who were members of the Marion Road Klan Drum Corps.

== Notable figures ==
=== D.C Stephenson ===
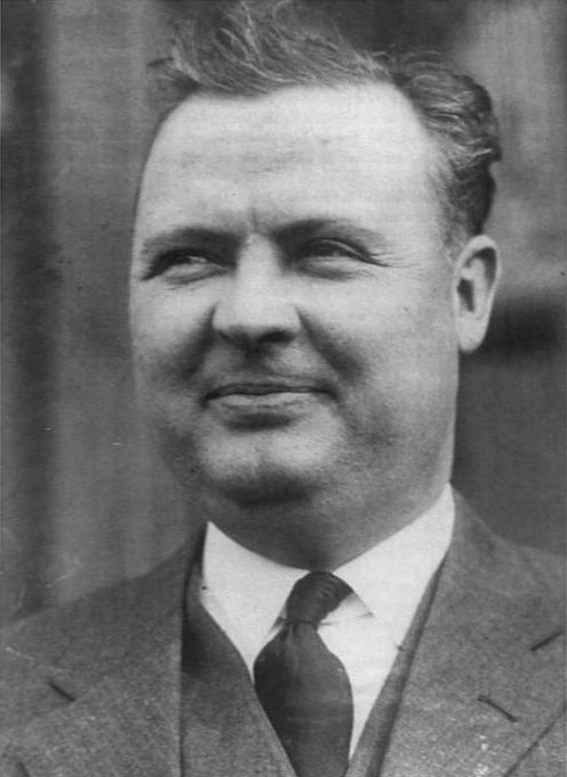
D. C. Stephenson, c. 1922

D.C. Stephenson was the Grand Dragon of the Indiana chapter of the Klan. He had a summer house at Buckeye Lake and was one of the main organizers for the Konclaves. He spoke at the 1923 Konclave about the Klan's goals, such as restoring the United States government to what the founding fathers intended and avoiding the rise of paganism. Stephenson was partially responsible for the eventual fall of the Klan following the 1925 Konclave. Shortly after the event, Stephenson was convicted of abducting, repeatedly raping, and murdering a 28-year-old woman named Madge Oberholtzer. On November 16, 1925, he was sentenced to life in prison on four counts of homicide.

=== H.N. Stevens ===
H.N. Stevens was the mayor of Newark, Ohio, from 1923 to 1928. He was a Klan-endorsed candidate and reportedly used Klan funds to support his campaign. He was elected in a time when many towns and cities across Ohio were electing Klan-affiliated politicians, which contributed to the prominence of the Klan during this period of the Klan's history. However, the Klan's local and state-level political influence quickly died down, and by 1928, it seemed that politicians were no longer seeking the financial aid of the Klan. At the end of his term, Stevens was arrested for assault with the intent to commit rape, and the Klan's presence in Newark became less prominent.
