= Julius Travis =

American judge (1869–1961)

Julius Curtis Travis

Justice of the Indiana Supreme Court
- In office January 3, 1921 – January 3, 1933
- Preceded by: Moses Lairy
- Succeeded by: Michael Fansler

Personal details
- Born: July 31, 1869 Pleasant Township, LaPorte County, Indiana, U.S.
- Died: March 11, 1961 (aged 91) Indianapolis, Indiana, U.S.
- Spouse: Ethel R. Closser
- Children: 4
- Education: University of Michigan (B.A., LL.B.)
- Profession: Lawyer, Politician, Sports journalist, Businessman, Judge

Julius Curtis Travis (July 31, 1869 – March 11, 1961) was an American lawyer, politician, sports journalist, businessman, and judge who served as a justice of the Indiana Supreme Court from January 3, 1921, to January 3, 1933.

== Biography ==
=== Early life, education, and career ===
Travis was born in Pleasant Township, LaPorte County, Indiana. His grandfather, Curtis Travis (of English descent) was originally from Sleepy Hollow, New York before becoming an early settler of northern Indiana. Travis's father, Wesley Travis, was a wealthy farmer in LaPorte County. Travis's mother, Rebecca Travis (née Brand) was originally from Schoharie County, New York.

Travis grew up on his family's farm and was educated at local schools in LaPorte County. In 1888, after graduating from LaPorte High School, Travis attended the University of Michigan (in Ann Arbor, Michigan), obtaining his B.A. and then, in 1894, his LL.B from the University of Michigan Law School. Travis was Manager of the school's varsity football and baseball teams. After graduating, he returned to LaPorte County.

Travis, a Republican, was a member of the Common Council of La Porte for ten years. He then served as LaPorte County's prosecuting attorney from 1898 to 1900, appointed by Governor James A. Mount following the election of the former prosecuting attorney to the bench of the local circuit court. Travis served as the city attorney of La Porte from 1912 to 1916, and was later the county attorney for LaPorte County from 1916 to 1920. Travis also served as the attorney for a local business, the Dr. Reeder Food Company.

=== Indiana Supreme Court Justice ===
Travis became a justice of the Indiana Supreme Court in 1921, succeeding Justice Moses Lairy. Travis was part of the three-judge majority that denied the appeal of D.C. Stephenson in the case of Stephenson v. State. Stephenson, a prominent Ku Klux Klan leader and powerful figure in Indiana politics, had attempted to appeal the death sentence he received for murdering and raping Madge Oberholtzer. Travis's re-election bid in 1926 was opposed by the KKK both due to his ruling in the Stephenson case and because the KKK was a pro-Temperance organization, and Travis had previously reversed the conviction of a defendant who had been charged with violating Indiana's Prohibition laws due to evidence in the case having been collected illegally. Despite the opposition of the KKK, Travis won re-election.

Another notable case from Travis's time on the court was State v. Shumaker. Governor Edward L. Jackson attempted to pardon Edward Shumaker, a local leader of the Anti-Saloon League, after Shumaker was found to be in contempt of court for spreading libelous information about the court's handling of cases involving Prohibition law violations. The pardon was challenged and the court ruled that the Governor did not have the power to pardon those found in contempt by the Supreme Court, with Travis writing the majority opinion. Travis lost re-election in the 1932 statewide Democratic sweep, succeeded on the court by Justice Michael Fansler.

After leaving the court, Travis continued to practice law in Indianapolis.

=== Personal life and death ===
Travis was the President of the Rustic Hickory Furniture Company, a prominent local business in La Porte. Travis also inspected buildings for the fire insurance companies of La Porte and ran a lumber company, a coal company, a hardware company, and a livestock farm.

Travis served as the secretary of the La Porte County Republican Committee for several years.

Travis was a sports editor for several newspapers, including the Chicago Tribune.

During both the First and Second World War, when military conscription was implemented in the United States, Travis served on the Selective Service Appeals Board.

Travis was a member of the bar associations of LaPorte County and Indiana. He was also a member of the American Law Institute.

Travis was involved with the Knights of Pythias. In 1893, while attending the University of Michigan Law School, he was elected Prelate of his local branch.

In 1896, Travis married Ethel R. Closser. They had four children. Ethel Travis was a member of the Indiana Assembly Women's Club.

Travis died in Indianapolis in 1961.

Political offices
Preceded by Moses Lairy	Justice of the Indiana Supreme Court; 1921–1933	Succeeded by Michael Fansler
