= Stephenson v. State =

1932 Indiana Supreme Court Case

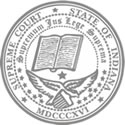
- Court: Indiana Supreme Court
- Full case name: Stephenson v. State of Indiana
- Decided: January 19, 1932
- Citations: 179 N.E. 633; 205 Ind. 141

Court membership
- Judges sitting: David Myers, Julius Travis, Clarence R. Martin, Curtis Roll, Walter Treanor

Case opinions
- Decision by: Per curiam
- Concurrence: Myers, Travis, Roll
- Concur/dissent: Treanor, Martin

Stephenson v. State, Indiana Supreme Court, 179 N.E. 633 (Ind. 1932), is a criminal case involving causation in criminal law, significant for its political and legal consequences. In 1925, David Curtiss Stephenson, leader of the Ku Klux Klan in Indiana abducted Madge Oberholtzer, injured her, and repeatedly raped her. She ingested poison and later died. Publicity for the case may have reversed ascendency of the Klan nationally. The case is legally significant in that it found "if a defendant engaged in the commission of a felony such as rape... inflicts upon his victim both physical and mental injuries, the natural and probable result of which would render the deceased mentally irresponsible and suicide followed, we think he would be guilty of murder".
