= Cross of Fire =

1989 American television miniseries

- Genre: Biography; Drama
- Written by: Robert Crais
- Directed by: Paul Wendkos
- Starring: John Heard; Mel Harris; David Morse; George Dzundza; Donald Moffat; Kim Hunter; Lloyd Bridges
- Music by: William Goldstein
- Country of origin: United States
- Original language: English

Production
- Executive producer: Leonard Hill
- Producer: Ronald H. Gilbert
- Cinematography: Ronald M. Lautore
- Editor: Christopher Cooke
- Running time: 200 minutes
- Production company: Leonard Hill Films

Original release
- Network: NBC
- Release: November 5 – November 6, 1989

Cross of Fire is a 1989 American television miniseries based on the rape and murder of Madge Oberholtzer by D. C. Stephenson, a highly successful leader of the Indiana branch of Ku Klux Klan. It stars John Heard as Stephenson and Mel Harris as Oberholtzer. Lloyd Bridges is also in the cast. It was originally shown in two parts (2 hours each night). The first was watched by 17.5 million viewers and the second by 20.4 million. In syndication, it is shown as a television movie.

== Cast ==
- John Heard as David "D.C." Stephenson
- Mel Harris as Madge Oberholtzer
- David Morse as Klell Henry
- George Dzundza as Boyd Gurley
- Donald Moffat as George Oberholtzer
- Kim Hunter as Mrs. Oberholtzer
- Dakin Matthews as Hiram Evans
- William Schallert as Reverend
- Dion Anderson as Senator Monroe
- Gilbert Lewis as Levi Thomas
- Tony Mockus Sr. as Judge Sparks (credited as Tony Mockus)
- Peggy Rea as Eunice Schultz
- Stephen Root as Beggs
- Luke Reilly as Millencamp
- Richard Riehle as Duvall
- Christopher Curry as Hollings
- Ray Reinhardt as Dr. Kingsbury
- Tim Snay as Governor Jackson
- Alan Clarey as Dr. Foreman
- Joneal Joplin as Dr. Moon
- Mark Robbins as Crowe
- Lloyd Bridges as Eph Inman
- Peggy Freisen as Harriet Monroe
- Jennifer Glimpse as Linda Ann Ferguson
- T. Max Graham as Kenley
- Annie Kellogg as Jommy
- Paul Meier as Templett
- Lynn Milgrim as Marsha Eames
- Marc Penney as LeBouf
- Jeris Poindexter as Royal Eames
- James Shelby as Broadbent
- Olivia Virgil White as Allie Eames (credited as Olivia Virgil Harper)
- Mimi Wickliff as Mrs. Adderly
- Pam Kristin as Secretary
- Buzz Barton as The Mayor of Addis (uncredited)

== Awards ==
Emmy Award for Outstanding Sound Mixing for a Drama Miniseries or a Special-for Part 1
