= Daisy Douglas Barr =

American extremist minister and racist

Daisy Douglas Barr (September 2, 1875 – April 3, 1938) was Imperial Empress (leader) of the Indiana Women's Ku Klux Klan (WKKK) in the early 1920s and an active member of the Women's Christian Temperance Union (WCTU). People were associated with both the KKK and the WCTU because the Ku Klux Klan was a very strong supporter and defender of temperance and National Prohibition. Professionally, she was a Quaker minister in two prominent churches, First Friends Church of New Castle, Indiana, and Friends Memorial Church in Muncie, Indiana. She served as the vice-chair of the Republican Committee in Indiana as well as president of the Indiana War Mother's organization. She was killed in a car wreck and her funeral was held in a Friends meeting.

== Early political activism ==
Daisy Douglas was born in Jonesboro, Indiana, to John R. Brushwiller and Sarah Douglas Brushwiller. However, she lived much of her life in Muncie, Indiana, and Indianapolis. At only 16 years old she became an evangelist and was dedicated to Republican views and therefore was the first woman to serve as vice-chair of the Indiana Republican party. She was a devout Quaker and married Thomas Barr in 1893. The couple had one son, Thomas Jr. in 1895. By 1896, Barr was ordained a minister and began preaching. She was noted as an excellent preacher, which served her well when she began to speak on social issues. Barr was able to draw in crowds of as much as 20,000 people with her oratory skills, especially crowds of the KKK.

The first social issue that Barr promoted was prohibition. In 1911, she recruited many people to join the anti-liquor movement. Her speaking abilities were so profound that she was able to attract as many as 1600 people to a single meeting and began to travel around the states and speak at various forums against alcohol. In addition to being against alcohol, Barr also preached for women's right to vote. She saw women's dependence on men as one of the key problems with alcohol abuse. After years of hard work by Barr, the Young Women's Christian Association, and other prohibitionists, the city of Muncie went dry in 1914.

Shortly after this victory in Muncie, Barr fell ill and then resigned from the ministry. By 1917, the family had relocated to Indianapolis, and in the 1920s Barr re-emerged as a political and religious leader. She became the president of the Indiana War Mothers and was the first woman vice-chair of the Republican Committee. By 1923, both Barr and the Chair of the Republican Committee resigned when it became public that they were both active members of the Ku Klux Klan. Because of this admission, Barr also resigned from Indiana War Mothers.

== Ku Klux Klan activities ==
In 1923, D. C. Stephenson chose Barr to head a woman's order of the Klan. This group was called the Queens of the Golden Mask and would be composed of mothers, daughters, and wives of Klansmen. Barr became the Imperial Empress of this organization. Eventually, the Queens of the Golden Mask were absorbed into the Women of the Ku Klux Klan. At this time, the Klan was a very popular organization in Indiana; estimates place the number of members between 125,000 and 500,000 men in Indiana. The Klan was anti-liquor, anti-political corruption, anti-prostitution, and believed in nativism (they disliked immigrants and non-Protestants). In a speech, Daisy had mentioned "I am clothed in wisdom's mantle," she said. "Age and experience are mine," as a precursor to talking about preserving white supremacy.

However, in 1924, another Klanswoman, Mary Benadum, filed a lawsuit claiming that Barr "had amassed a fortune off the dues of Klansmen." Moreover, she would use her notable name and Klan office to make money from it all. The profit came mainly from selling Klan women's robes and other paraphernalia. Some scholars have speculated that the charges resulted from Barr's and Benadum's intense competition for leadership of the WKKK in Muncie, Indiana. Two years later Daisy Barr was replaced in her leadership position in the WKKK by Lillian Sedwick, who was a state official in the WCTU.

== Death ==
Barr died on April 3, 1938, in Clark County, Indiana, north of Jeffersonville, after sustaining a broken neck in a head-on car collision on US Highway 31.

== See also ==
- Indiana Klan
- D. C. Stephenson

== Sources ==
- Blee, Kathleen M., "Women of the Klan: Racism and Gender in the 1920s", University of California Press, Berkeley, CA, 1991
- Hoover, Dwight W., Daisy Douglas Barr: From Quaker to Klan "Kluckeress." Indiana Magazine of History, Volume 87, Issue 2, June 1991.
