= Mel Harris =

American actress (born 1956)

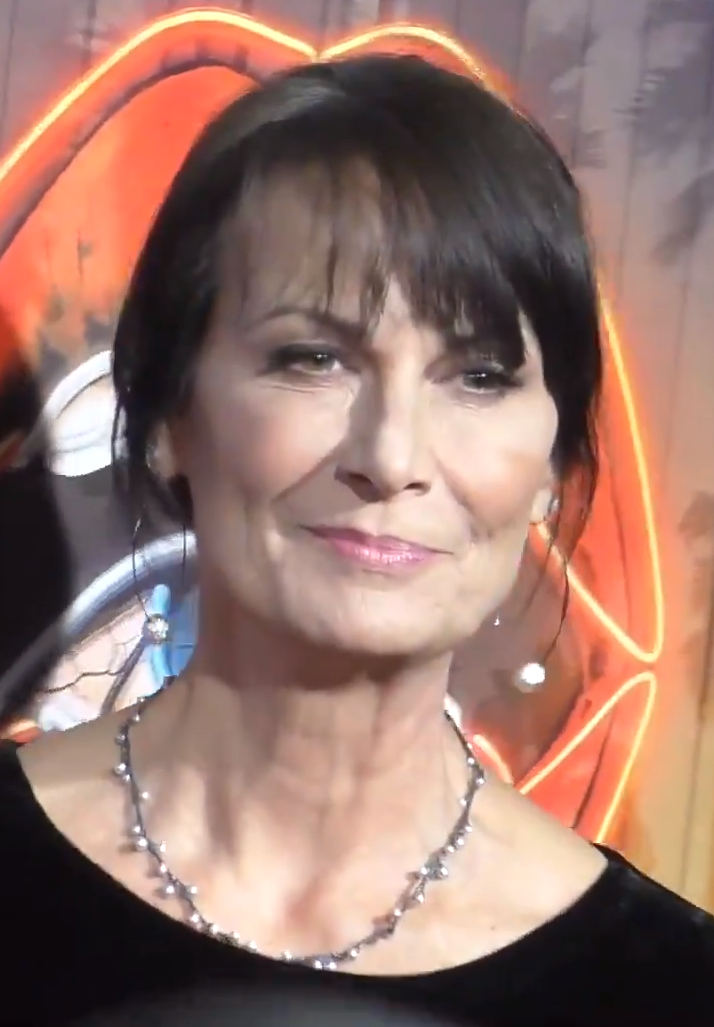
- Harris in December 2016
- Born: July 12, 1956 (age 70); Bethlehem, Pennsylvania, U.S.
- Education: New Brunswick High School
- Occupation: Actress
- Years active: 1977–present
- Spouses: David Silbergeld (m. 1978; div. 1979); Brian Kilcommons (m. 1980; div. 1982); David Hume Kennerly (m. 1983; div. 1988); Cotter Smith (m. 1988; div. 1996); Michael Toomey (m. 2001; div. 2006); Bob Brush (m. 2009)
- Children: 2

Mel Harris (born July 12, 1956) is an American actress best known for her role as Hope Murdoch Steadman in the ABC drama series Thirtysomething (1987–1991), for which she received a Golden Globe nomination in 1990.

== Early life and education ==
Harris was born in Bethlehem, Pennsylvania, the daughter to Mary Michael "Mike", a high-school science teacher, and Warren Harris, football coach at Bethlehem High School and Princeton University. Harris grew up in North Brunswick, New Jersey and graduated from New Brunswick High School in New Brunswick, New Jersey, in 1974.

== Career ==
In 1985, shortly before her 1986 acting debut, Harris appeared as a regular contestant on the Dick Clark-hosted syndicated game show The $100,000 Pyramid, credited as Mel Kennerly – her third husband's surname. She returned to the game show in 1991, as a celebrity on the John Davidson-hosted show, with a clip of her win in 1985 shown in a flashback.

=== Television ===
Harris made her television debut in 1986, with a small role as a character's girlfriend in an episode of Alfred Hitchcock Presents. After appearances in a single episode each of three other series over 1986–1987, Harris had her first starring role, as Hope Murdoch Steadman in the ABC drama series Thirtysomething (1987–1991). The series received critical acclaim during its run, with Harris nominated for a Golden Globe Award for Best Actress – Television Series Drama in 1990. She directed one episode during the final season.

In 1989, Harris played real-life victim Madge Oberholtzer in the miniseries Cross of Fire. In the 1990s, Harris had many leading roles in made-for-TV movies and miniseries, include The Burden of Proof (1992), Ultimate Betrayal (1994) and The Women of Spring Break (1995). From 1996 to 1998, she starred with Jere Burns in the NBC sitcom Something So Right. The series was cancelled after two seasons.

Harris has appeared in a number of television series in 2000s, including Touched by an Angel, Stargate SG-1, The West Wing, JAG, House, and Criminal Minds. In 2007, she was a regular cast member in the MyNetworkTV limited-run serial Saints & Sinners. At that time, she began working as a writer. She was executive producer and creator of 2012 ABC drama pilot Scruples based on the 1978 novel by Judith Krantz. After a six-year hiatus, Harris returned to television in 2013, appearing in the two episodes of Law & Order: Special Victims Unit. In 2016, Harris starred in the first season of Hulu drama series Shut Eye, and from 2017 to 2018 had a recurring role in the Bravo comedy series Imposters.

In January 2020, ABC ordered a sequel for Thirtysomething, with Harris set to return alongside original co-stars Ken Olin, Patricia Wettig, and Timothy Busfield. In June 2020, ABC decided not to move forward with the sequel.

=== Film ===
Harris made her film debut playing a female leading role in the 1987 action film Wanted: Dead or Alive starring Rutger Hauer. During the time that she was appearing on Thirtysomething, she also starred in the horror film Cameron's Closet (1988) and action comedy K-9 (1989). That same year, Harper's Bazaar named her one of "America's 10 Most Beautiful Women".

She co-starred in the 1992 psychological horror-thriller film Raising Cain, and the following year played the leading role in the thriller film Suture. Other film credits include The Pagemaster (1994), Hangman's Curse (2003), and The Lodger (2009).

== Personal life ==
Harris has been married six times. She was married to David Silbergeld from 1978 to 1979; Brian Kilcommons from 1980 to 1982; photographer David Hume Kennerly from 1983 to 1988 (with whom she has a son); actor Cotter Smith from 1988 to 1996 (with whom she has a daughter); and Michael Toomey from 2001 to 2006. She has been married to screenwriter and producer Bob Brush since 2009.

== Filmography ==
=== Film ===
Year	Title	Role	Notes
1986	Wanted: Dead or Alive	Terry	
1988	Cameron's Closet	Nora Haley	
1989	K-9	Tracy	
1992	Raising Cain	Sarah	
1993	Distant Cousins	Katherine June Sullivan	
1993	Suture	Dr. Renee Descartes	
1993	Wind Dancer	Susan Allen	
1994	The Pagemaster	Claire Tyler	
2000	Sonic Impact	Co-Pilot Jennifer Blake	
2001	Firetrap	Cordelia Calloway	
2003	Hangman's Curse	Sarah Springfield	
2004	Dynamite	Faye Baxter	
2005	The Naked Brothers Band: The Movie	Mel Harris	Cameo appearance
2005	Purple Heart	Dr. Harrison	
2006	Arc	Charlie	
2009	The Lodger	Margaret	
2009	Imagine That	Maggie Johnson	Uncredited
2020	King of Knives	Kathy	

=== Television ===
Year	Title	Role	Notes
1986	Alfred Hitchcock Presents	Girlfriend	Episode: "A Very Happy Ending"
1986	Heart of the City	Anne	Episode: "Working Without a Net"
1986	The Wizard	Jane Whittier	Episode: "Trouble in the Stars"
1987	Rags to Riches	Jessica	Episode: "First Love"
1989	Cross of Fire	Madge Oberholtzer'	Television film
1989	My Brother's Wife	Eleanor Goldberg-Rusher	Television film
1987–1991	Thirtysomething	Hope Murdoch Steadman	Series regular, 85 episodes Nominated — Golden Globe Award for Best Actress – Television Series Drama (1990); Nominated — Viewers for Quality Television Award for Best Actress in a Quality Drama Series (1990)
1992	The Burden of Proof	Sonia Klonsky	Miniseries
1992	Grass Roots	Kate Rule	Television film
1992	Child of Rage	Jill Tyler	Television film
1993	With Hostile Intent	Kathy Arnold	Television film
1993	Desperate Journey: The Allison Wilcox Story	Allison Wilcox	Television film
1994	Ultimate Betrayal	Susan Rodgers	Television film
1994	The Spider and the Fly	Dianna Taylor	Television film
1994	Broken Lullaby	Jordan Kirkland	Television film
1995	The Women of Spring Break	Claire	Television film
1995	The Secretary	Ellen Bradford	Television film
1995	Sharon's Secret	Laurel O'Connor	Television film
1995	Raising Caines	Julie Caine	Series regular, 6 episodes
1996	A Case for Life	Liz	Television film
1996	The Outer Limits	Dr. Christina Markham	Episode: "Paradise"
1996	What Kind of Mother Are You?	Mrs. Laura Hyler	Television film
1997	Murder, She Wrote: South by Southwest	Sarah McLeish / Judy Taylor	Television film
1996–1998	Something So Right	Carly Davis	Lead Role, 38 episodes
1999	Dawson's Creek	Helen Lindley	Episode: "Guess Who's Coming to Dinner"
2000	Out of Time	Annie Epson	Television film
2000	Madigan Men	Dr. Ivy Castelli	Episode: "Love and Dermatology"
2001	Touched by an Angel	Kelly Rockhill	Episode: "The Lord Moves in Mysterious Ways"
2001	The Retrievers	Karen Lowry	Television film
2002	Strong Medicine	Biddy Hightower	Episode: "Recovery Time"
2002	Another Pretty Face	Diana Downs	Television film
2004	North Shore	Mrs. Jensen	Episode: "Illusions"
2002–2005	Stargate SG-1	Oma Desala	Episodes: "Meridian", "Reckoning: Part 1" and "Threads"
2005	The West Wing	Ricky Rafferty	Episode: "Drought Conditions"
2005	Jake in Progress	Tally Hughes	Episode: "Ubusy?"
2005	JAG	Dora Cresswell	Episodes: "Straits of Malacca" and "Death at the Mosque"
2005	Out of the Woods	Beth Fleming	Television film
2006	E-Ring	U.S.Ambassador to Spain	Episode: "The General"
2006	Cold Case	Grace Anderson	Episode: "Superstar"
2006	House	Barbara Bardach	Episode: "Safe"
2006	CSI: NY	Julie Rollins	Episode: "And Here's to You, Mrs. Azrael"
2006	Criminal Minds	Congresswoman Steyer	Episode: "Sex, Birth, Death"
2007	Close to Home	Beth Murphy	Episode: "Maternal Instinct"
2007	Cane	Constance Hughes	Episode: "Open and Shut"
2007	Saints & Sinners	Sylvia Capshaw	Series regular, 61 episodes
2013–2014	Law & Order: Special Victims Unit	Eileen Switzer	Episodes: "Rapist Anonymous" and "Amaro's One-Eighty"
2015	Crazy Ex-Girlfriend	Shawna	Episode: "My Mom, Greg's Mom and Josh's Sweet Dance Moves!"
2016	Shut Eye	Nadine Davies	9 episodes
2017–2018	Imposters	Margaret Jonson	5 episodes
