= Oliver Starr =

American judge (1883–1961)

Oliver Starr (December 10, 1883 – March 28, 1961) was an American judge and justice of the Indiana Supreme Court from January 1, 1945, to January 1, 1951.

== Early life, education, and career ==
Born in Wells County, Indiana, Starr received a Bachelor of Arts from Indiana University Bloomington in 1905, and an LL.B. from the University of Michigan Law School in 1908. He was a city attorney for Gary, Indiana, and a prosecuting attorney for Lake County, Indiana, for which he prosecuted the noted bombing of the State Theater. Starr left the prosecutor's office in 1931, and entered private practice.

== Political and judicial career ==
A Republican, Starr ran unsuccessfully for an appellate court seat in 1934, and for the United States Senate in 1938. In 1944, he ran for a seat on the Supreme Court of Indiana, and succeeded as part of an election in which the Republican Party swept major offices throughout the state. Starr thereafter served on the Indiana Supreme Court from 1945 to 1951. As a Justice, Starr authored 124 opinions, including a noted opinion holding a Circuit Court Judge in contempt for the politically motivated appointment of a special prosecutor.

== Personal life ==
Starr married Mary Helen Snyder on June 23, 1913, with whom he three sons and two daughters.

He died in Chesterton, Indiana.

Political offices
Preceded by Michael L. Fansler	Justice of the Indiana Supreme Court; 1945–1951	Succeeded by Floyd S. Draper
