= Quincy Alden Myers =

American judge (1853–1921)

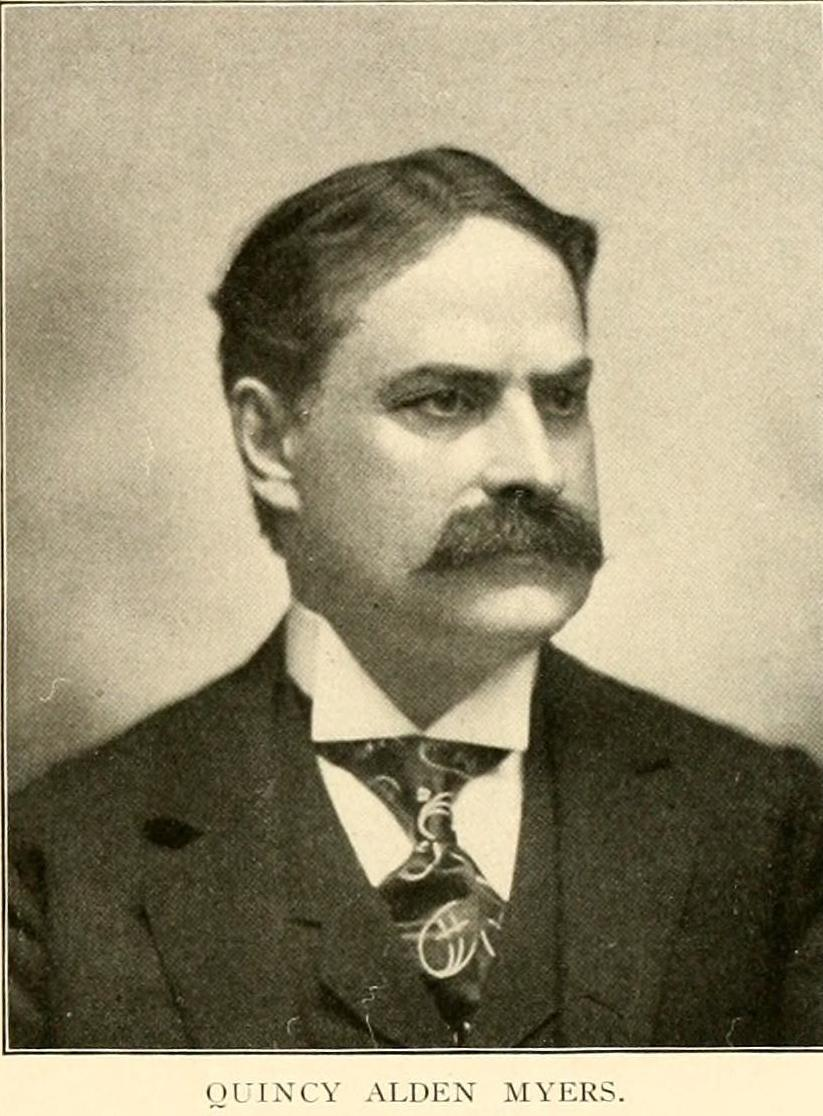
Myers in 1899

Quincy Alden Myers (September 1, 1853 – December 29, 1921) was a justice of the Indiana Supreme Court from January 4, 1909, to January 4, 1915.

== Early life and education ==
Born in Clinton Township, Cass County, Indiana, and raised in Logansport, Indiana, Myers attended the Presbyterian Academy of Logansport and the Northwestern Christian University of Indianapolis, until illness forced him to withdraw from school. After studying at home with a tutor for a time, he entered Dartmouth College in 1873, graduating with honors in 1875. After reading law under the supervision of two Logansport attorneys, he entered Albany Law School, graduating as valedictorian of his class in 1877.

== Career ==
Myers entered the practice of law in Logansport and served as city attorney there from 1885 to 1887, and as county attorney of Cass County, Indiana, from 1895 to 1897. In the 1900 United States presidential election he was chosen as one of the presidential electors from Indiana. Myers was elected to the Indiana Supreme Court in 1908, serving on the court from 1909 to 1915. In 1916, he was a Republican candidate for governor against James P. Goodrich, a contest which Goodrich would ultimately win. When not holding political or judicial offices, Myers had a lucrative legal practice.

== Personal life and death ==
Myers' parents were Isaac Neff Myers and Rosanna Justice Myers. He married Jessie D. Cornelius of Indianapolis on March 3, 1886. They had two daughters, one of whom died in 1910, and the other of whom survived Myers, as did his wife.

Myers died at St. Vincent Indianapolis Hospital at the age of 68, from a streptococcic blood infection, following a short illness.

Political offices
Preceded by John H. Gillett	Justice of the Indiana Supreme Court; 1909–1915	Succeeded by Moses Lairy
