= Moses Lairy =

American judge (1859–1927)

Justice of the Indiana Supreme Court
- In office January 4, 1915 – January 3, 1921
- Preceded by: Quincy Alden Myers
- Succeeded by: Julius Travis

Personal details
- Education: University of Michigan

Moses Barnett Lairy (August 13, 1859 – April 9, 1927) was an American lawyer, politician, and judge who served as a justice of the Indiana Supreme Court from January 4, 1915, to January 3, 1921.

== Early life, education, and career ==
Lairy was born in Harrison Township, Cass County, Indiana to Thomas Lairy and Eliza Barnett Lairy. His family was of Irish descent and originally lived in Butler County, Ohio before moving to Lafayette, Indiana and then again to Cass County. His brother, John S. Lairy, also became a judge.

Lairy was raised on the family farm in rural Cass County. He attended local schools until age seventeen, when his father died and he took on the responsibilities of head of the household. Lairy later resumed his education at Valparaiso University (then known as the Northern Indiana Normal School). He taught at a schoolhouse in Fulton County to help fund his education.

Lairy began studying law under judge Dudley H. Case. In 1888, he began attending the Law School of the University of Michigan in Ann Arbor. After graduating in 1889, he moved back to Indiana, setting up a private law practice in Logansport, working in partnership with DeWitt C. Justice and M.F. Mahoney.

== Judicial service and later life ==
Lairy, a Democrat, was active in local politics. He was a candidate for the judgeship of the Cass County Circuit Court, but was defeated. In 1895, he was appointed to the Cass County circuit court by Governor Claude Matthews to fill the vacant seat on the court left by D.B. McConnell's resignation. In 1910, he ran to become judge of 5th Judicial District, but was narrowly defeated by Quincy Alden Myers, another future Indiana Supreme Court justice and friend of Lairy's. In 1910, he was elected as a judge of the Indiana Court of Appeals.

Lairy was elected to the Indiana Supreme Court in 1914, defeating the incumbent Justice Quincy Myers, the same man who had defeated Lairy in the 1908 5th Judicial District race. During his time on the court, Lairy wrote a concurring opinion on a case involving Senate Bill No. 77, which would have given women the right to vote in municipal elections in Indiana. Lairy said the bill was unconstitutional and that the General Assembly lacked the power of enfranchisement. Lairy left the bench in 1921, succeeded by Justice Julius Travis.

After leaving the court, Lairy continued to practice law, joining the Indianapolis firm of Myers, Gates & Ralston. Samuel M. Ralston, former Democratic Governor of Indiana, was a partner at the firm, as was future U.S. Senator from Indiana, Frederick Van Nuys. Quincy Myers was one of the partners at the firm, but he died in 1921, with Lairy succeeding him as a partner of the firm just as Lairy had succeeded him to the court.

Lairy was invited by the Indiana Supreme Court as an amicus curiae in State v. Shumaker, a case involving Edward Shumaker, head of the Indiana Anti-Saloon League, who made libelous claims about the Indiana Supreme Court's handling of cases involving violations of new Prohibition laws. The court found Shumaker in contempt for his claims. Governor Edward L. Jackson tried to pardon Shumaker, but the court ruled the Governor did not have the power to pardon those found in contempt by the Supreme Court.

In a widely publicized case, Lairy defended Delaware County Circuit Judge Clarence W. Dearth in his impeachment trial heard before the Indiana Senate. Residents of Muncie petitioned for Dearth's impeachment after he was accused of corruption and being affiliated with the Ku Klux Klan by a local journalist. Lairy achieved a narrow victory, with the motion to remove Dearth from office failing by two votes.

== Personal life and death ==
Lairy married Mazetta Rogers, a public school teacher, in 1892 in Logansport. In 1915, they divorced, with Mazetta accusing her husband of having an extramarital affair. Mazetta later moved to Los Angeles, California. Lairy remarried to Nina Justice, daughter of his former law partner, DeWitt Justice.

Lairy was a Presbyterian, a Freemason, and a member of the Benevolent and Protective Order of Elks. Lairy was a friend and mentor of future Indiana Supreme Court Justice Michael Fansler.

Barely a week after the Dearth impeachment trial, Lairy died in 1927 in Logansport.

Political offices
Preceded by Quincy Alden Myers	Justice of the Indiana Supreme Court; 1915–1921	Succeeded by Julius Travis
