= Dennis Hayden (actor) =

American actor

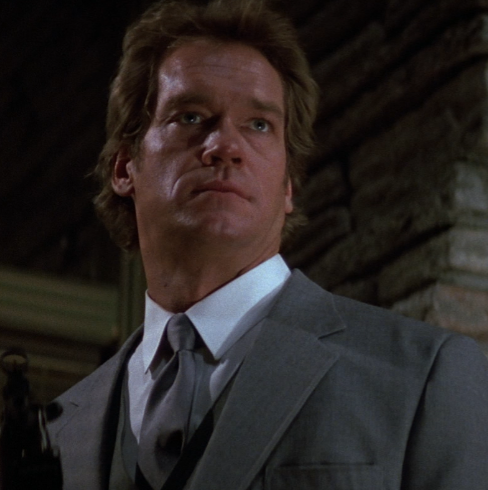
- Dennis Hayden in Die Hard (1988)
- Born: April 7, 1952 (age 74); Girard, Kansas

Dennis Hayden (born April 7, 1952) is an American actor, producer and writer, most famous for his role as Eddie, one of the terrorists in the 1988 action film Die Hard.

== Early life ==
Dennis Hayden was one of five brothers and one sister born in Girard, Kansas, on a pig and soybean farm. He worked the wheat harvest during summers off from high school, graduating in 1970. He worked the summer wheat harvests and played football, becoming the number one tackle in Kansas. He attended Fort Scott Junior College for the game, but then, when he was nineteen, decided to head to the West Coast and try out acting. At this point, he got involved in theater, commercials, TV and films.

== In popular culture ==
Since his appearance in Die Hard, Hayden's resemblance to singer Huey Lewis has been often noted. In The Cleveland Show's parody episode "Die Semi-Hard", Lewis voiced a character who stood in for Hayden's Eddie but was referred to only as "the guy who looks like Huey Lewis".

Dennis Hayden is the white coach in a 2017 Von Miller Old Spice commercial.

== Filmography ==
- 1985 Tomboy as Bartender
- 1986 Murphy's Law as Sonny
- 1986 Jo Jo Dancer, Your Life Is Calling as Policeman #1
- 1987 Slam Dance as Mean Drunk
- 1988 Action Jackson as Shaker
- 1988 Die Hard as Eddie
- 1990 Another 48 Hrs. as Barroom Tough
- 1993 Midnight Witness as Cowboy
- 1994 One Man Army as Eddie Taylor
- 1995 Beyond Desire as Lieutenant Davis
- 1995 Wild Bill as Phil Coe
- 1995 The Random Factor as Senator James Lockholt
- 1995 Fatal Choice as Jim Kale
- 1997 George B. as Tom
- 1997 Wishmaster as Security Guard
- 2000 Stageghost as Merrill
- 2001 Knight Club as Cowboy
- 2001 Echos of Enlightenment as Frank Savage
- 2002 Sniper 2 as Klete
- 2003 The Negative Pick-Up as T (Tall Man)
- 2003 The Librarians as Bouncer (uncredited)
- 2005 Purple Hearth as Earl
- 2007 Carts as Ted
- 2008 Trucker as Trucker
- 2008 Light Years Away as Launch Guard #1
- 2009 Race to Witch Mountain as Ray
- 2009 A Way with Murder as T
- 2009 Dead in Love as 'Slim' Sheppard
- 2012 Night of the Living Dead 3D: Re-Animation as Tall Zombie
- 2016 A Journey to a Journey as President Warren Benchley
