= Ultimate Betrayal =

- Genre: Drama
- Written by: Gregory Goodell
- Directed by: Donald Wrye
- Starring: Marlo Thomas; Mel Harris; Kathryn Dowling; Ally Sheedy; Nigel Bennett; Kyle Simon Parker; Valerie Buhagiar; Henry Czerny; Eileen Heckart; Donna Goodhand
- Music by: Chris Boardman
- Country of origin: United States
- Original language: English

Production
- Executive producer: Donald Wrye
- Producers: Wendy Kram; Julian Marks; Jane Valentine; Gregory Goodell
- Cinematography: Dick Bush
- Editor: Sharyn L. Ross
- Running time: 96 minutes

Original release
- Network: CBS
- Release: March 20, 1994

Ultimate Betrayal is a 1994 American made-for-television drama film directed by Donald Wrye and starring Marlo Thomas, Mel Harris, Ally Sheedy, Kathryn Dowling, Henry Czerny, Nigel Bennett, Kyle Simon Parker, and Valerie Buhagiar. It originally premiered March 20, 1994, on CBS.

== Plot ==
The 4 adult Rodgers sisters have been experiencing issues stemming from their childhoods, where they were subjected to extreme physical, and sexual abuse, at the hands of their father, Edward, a top ranking F.B.I. expert on child abuse, while their mother, Helen, turned a blind eye. Mary, the youngest sister is proposing a lawsuit against Edward, to pay the $400 monthly cost of her therapy, and she calls on her three sisters to support her by testifying. Their 2 brothers, John, and Steven, were also abused, but are close to their father now, and side with him. Susan and Beth want to be let out of it, even though they both acknowledge the effect the abuse had on them. The oldest daughter, Sharon, initially says she'll support Mary by testifying to what she saw, but she herself had not experienced any abuse.

Mary tells Sharon she is dropping her lawsuit when her husband tells her it is ruining their marriage, and threatens to divorce her and take their daughter away. By then, Sharon had already revealed to herself, many repressed memories, has talked to her therapist, Sarah McNeil, and is ready to pursue the case. Susan is convinced by her teenage daughter, who has been through her mother's hospitalizations and suicide attempt, to pursue the case. Sharon and Susan go to Colorado, where the abuse happened, and meet with the attorney Mary found, Dana Quinn. Dana calls their mother Helen, and even though she eventually acknowledges the physical abuse, she denies any sexual abuse happened, says that there was nothing she could do to stop it, and that Sharon was his pet, and could've made any of it stop. She thinks the girls should just get over it.

During a pretrial hearing, Sharon and Susan sit at a boardroom table with Dana, across from their father, and his attorney. Dana questions him, and he denies everything. The go to trial, but Edward does not show up. It's highly unusual, but they proceed with the trial, even in the absence of a defendant. Sharon has begun to recall memories of the same sexual abuse her sisters experienced, and tries to get Beth to join their lawsuit. Their brother Steve is threatening to disown Beth if she testifies. Susan testifies about various incidents including being molested, raped, and beaten in her father's room, the basement.

Both Beth and Mary agree to go support their sisters, even though it is unclear if they will take the stand. John and Steven also arrive, attempting to provide a defense for their father, but the judge denies the attempt, stating that Edward could've appeared on his own behalf, but chose not to. All of the siblings argue outside of the court room. Beth takes the stand, but in addition to the beatings and molestation, she got pregnant at 17, and was sent away for 9 months. Her parents put her son up for adoption without giving her a choice. Beth and the father of her son, her now-husband, Tom, have been trying to find him ever since. After she had the baby, Edward continued to molest her, saying that "she's a woman now".

Mary never takes the stand, but she tells her three sisters a harrowing account of the abuse she faced, being the youngest, when they older siblings had left home. Sharon and Susan are awarded $2.3 million, twice the amount they asked. Their father disappeared to avoid the judgement. Later, the same year the movie was released, legislation "The Child Abuse Accountability Act" was signed into law by President Bill Clinton.

== Cast ==
- Marlo Thomas as Sharon Rodgers Simone
  - Chandra Michaels as young Sharon
  - Tiffany Leonardo as little Sharon
- Mel Harris as Susan Rodgers Hammond
  - Kim Schraner as Susan age 15-19
  - Chantellese Kent as Susan age 12
  - Katie Zegers as little Susan
- Kathryn Dowling as Beth Rodgers
  - Tanya Allen as Beth age 17
  - Suzanne Hammond as young Beth
- Ally Sheedy as Mary Rodgers LaRocque
  - Luisa Zane as Mary age 7
- Nigel Bennett as Steven Rodgers
  - John David Wood as young Steven
  - B.J. McLellan as little Steven
- Kyle Simon Parker as John Rodgers
  - Marc Donato as young John
  - Chandler Nicol as little John
- Henry Czerny as Edward Rodgers
- Valerie Buhagiar as Helen Rodgers
  - Pam Hyatt as older Helen
- Donna Goodhand as Dana Quinn
- Eileen Heckart as Sarah McNeil
- Jo Vannicola as Karla

== Release ==
The film premiered on Sunday, March 20, 1994, on the CBS TV network.

== Reception ==
Ken Tucker of Entertainment Weekly wrote, "The best thing about Betrayal is that it makes child abuse seem nauseatingly horrific, not merely the nasty bit of inconvenience that too many tidied-up-for-prime-time movies have depicted. Far from being luridly entertaining, the movie repulses with oppressive details of the father’s acts, shown in flashback."

John J. O'Connor of The New York Times wrote, "While powerful in its best moments, "Ultimate Betrayal" is a touch too schematic in construction. If one of the sisters gets a "big scene," the three others are certain to get their equally impressive solo turns. The four skilled actresses, especially Ms. Thomas, don't disappoint. The film as a whole, though, founders on its earnestness."

Lynne Heffley of the Los Angeles Times wrote, "The impact is diminished, ironically, by graphic flashbacks using child actors. Too frequent not to seem gratuitous, the scenes contain little that can't be seen in the expressive faces of the adult leads."

== Digital & home media ==
The film was released on DVD on March 9, 2012, from Fisher Klingenstein Films. On the same date, it was also released for streaming and rentals by YouTube, Amazon Video, Google Play Movies and TV, and iTunes.

== Legacy ==
On October 14, 1994, President Bill Clinton signed into public law, #103-358, The Child Abuse Accountability Act, that was based on the landmark case by 2 of the real-life Rodgers sisters the film is based on, and was introduced into legislation by Rep Patricia Schroeder (D-Colo.).
