= John H. Gillett =

American judge

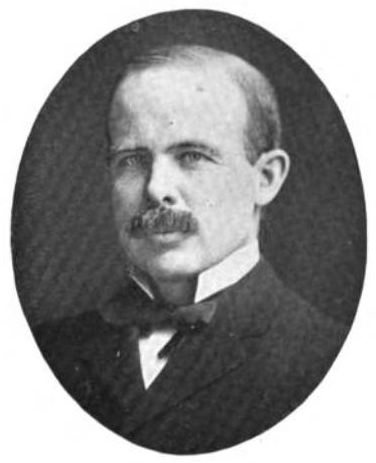

Justice of the Indiana Supreme Court
- In office January 25, 1902 – January 4, 1909

Personal details
- Born: John Henry Gillett; September 18, 1860 Medina, New York, U.S.
- Died: March 16, 1920 (aged 59) Hammond, Indiana, U.S.
- Occupation: Judge

John Henry Gillett (September 18, 1860 – March 16, 1920) was a justice of the Indiana Supreme Court from January 25, 1902, to January 4, 1909.

== Biography ==
John H. Gillett was born in Medina, New York on September 18, 1860. He was admitted to the bar in Porter County, Indiana in 1881, and taught law at Valparaiso College from 1882 to 1886.

Gillett was an assistant attorney general of Indiana before being appointed as a circuit judge of Lake County in 1890, where he served until his appointment to the state supreme court in 1902. He served as chief justice from 1903 to 1908.

After retiring from the bench, Gillett practiced corporate law in Hammond, Indiana, and wrote several law books.

He hanged himself in his home with a clothesline, several months after the death of his wife.

Political offices
| Preceded by Francis E. Baker | Justice of the Indiana Supreme Court; 1902–1909 | Succeeded by Quincy Alden Myers |
