= Michael Fansler =

American judge (1883–1963)

Justice of the Indiana Supreme Court
- In office January 4, 1933 – January 1, 1945
- Preceded by: Julius Travis
- Succeeded by: Oliver Starr

Michael Louis Fansler (July 4, 1883 – July 26, 1963) was an American lawyer, football player, politician, and judge who served as a justice of the Indiana Supreme Court from January 4, 1933, to January 1, 1945.

== Biography ==
=== Early life, education, and career ===
Fansler was born in Logansport, Indiana to Michael David and Johanna Fansler (née Mulcahy). Michael David Fansler (born 1857 in Wyandotte County, Ohio), the son of one of Logansport's early physicians, was of Scots-Irish, German, and French descent. M.D. Fansler was a prominent local lawyer, serving for most of his career as a prosecutor. Johanna "Nannie" Fansler was the daughter of an Irish immigrant.

Fansler began attending Notre Dame Law School at the University of Notre Dame (in Notre Dame, Indiana) in 1901. He was a member of the Notre Dame Fighting Irish football team. Known to his teammates as "Big Mike" (he was over six feet tall), he played a variety of positions during his time on the team. He graduated and was admitted to the bar in 1905.

Fansler returned to Cass County. From 1906 to 1910, he served as Assistant Prosecuting Attorney of the 29th Judicial Circuit, working under prosecutor George C. Custer. From 1910 to 1914, he served as the Prosecuting Attorney of the 29th Circuit, succeeding Custer. In 1915, Fansler became a partner at the private firm of Rabb, Mahoney, Fansler & Douglass. He remained at the firm until 1932. Fansler helped to organize a liberty loan drive in Cass County during the First World War. Fansler was a Democrat.

=== Judicial career and later life ===
Fansler became a justice of the Indiana Supreme Court in 1933. In 1941, Fansler delivered a speech titled "Some Public Reactions to Procedural Methods" at a meeting of the Indiana State Bar Association. Fansler left the court in 1945, succeeded by Justice Oliver Starr.

Fansler chaired the Indiana Judicial Council from 1951 to 1960.

=== Personal life and death ===
Fansler was a member of the Indiana State Bar Association and the American Bar Association. He was also a member of the Gamma Eta Gamma and an Elk. Moses Lairy, another Indiana Supreme Court Justice (1915–1921), was a friend and mentor to Fansler. Fansler wrote a letter to Governor Paul V. McNutt to thank him for leading the Democrats to a landslide victory in the 1932 elections.

In 1909, Fansler married Katherine Hall of Peru, Indiana. During the First World War, Katherine Fansler was a member of the Women's Section of the Indiana State Council of Defense, the Indiana branch of the nationwide volunteer organization that helped coordinate Americans resources and industry for the war effort.

Fansler died in Indianapolis in 1963.

Political offices
Preceded by Julius Travis	Justice of the Indiana Supreme Court; 1933–1945	Succeeded by Oliver Starr
