= Indianapolis Times =

Newspaper in Indianapolis, Indiana (1888–1965)

- Indianapolis Times, May 27, 1936
- Type: Daily newspaper
- Owner: Scripps-Howard
- Founder(s): J. J. Sweeny & Fred L. Purdy
- Founded: 1888; 138 years ago
- Ceased publication: October 11, 1965
- City: Indianapolis, Indiana
- Country: US
- Circulation: 90,000 daily; 101,000 Sunday; (as of 1965)
- Free online archives: https://newspapers.library.in.gov/?a=cl&cl=CL1&sp=IPT&e=-------en-20--1--txt-txIN-------

The Indianapolis Times was an evening newspaper that served the city of Indianapolis, Indiana, from 1888 to 1965 when the paper ceased publishing.

== History ==
The Indianapolis Times began as the Sun in 1888, "the only one cent paper in Indiana" at the time. J. J. Sweeney owned the majority of the company and Fred L. Purdy owned a minority share and filled the role of editor. From 1888 to 1899, the Sun's circulation grew to almost 13,000. The daily paper was renamed the Indianapolis Sun in 1899.

Indiana newspaper businessman Rudolph G. Leeds bought the Indianapolis Sun in 1910 before selling it to George H. Larke and William D. Boyce in 1913. Under the name Evening Sun from 1913 to 1914, the circulation of the paper spiked to over 34,000. Boyce and the new co-owner, John W. Banbury, renamed the paper the Indiana Daily Times in 1914, and it reached a circulation of over 46,000 the following year.

It was not until 1922 that the paper became the Indianapolis Times when Scripps-Howard bought it. Roy W. Howard was the president of Scripps-Howard publishing from 1922 to 1964. He managed the Times alongside the United Press International wire service.

== Journalistic impact ==
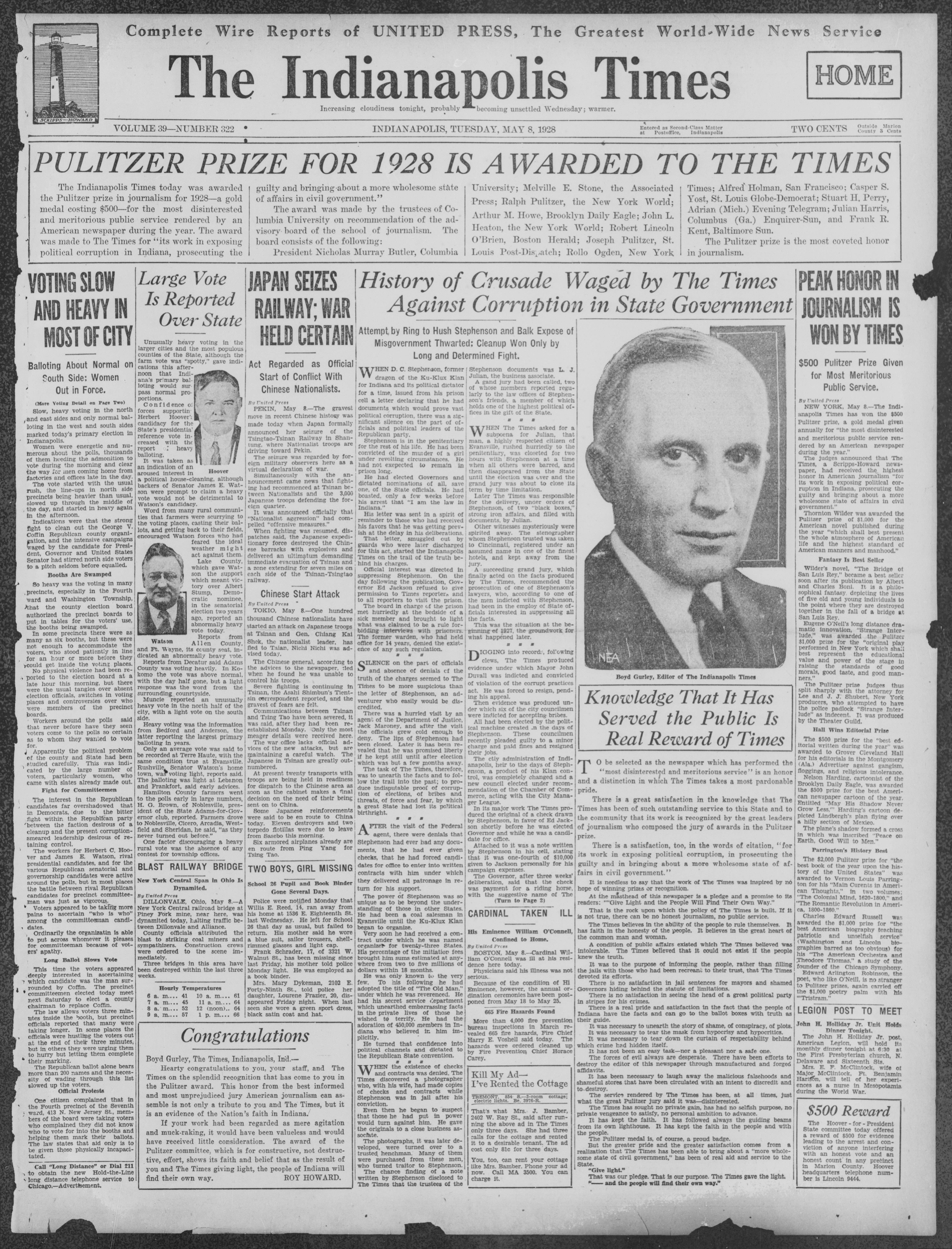
Front page of the May 8, 1928 issue of the Indianapolis Times, lauding its Pulitzer Prize for covering the Ku Klux Klan in Indiana

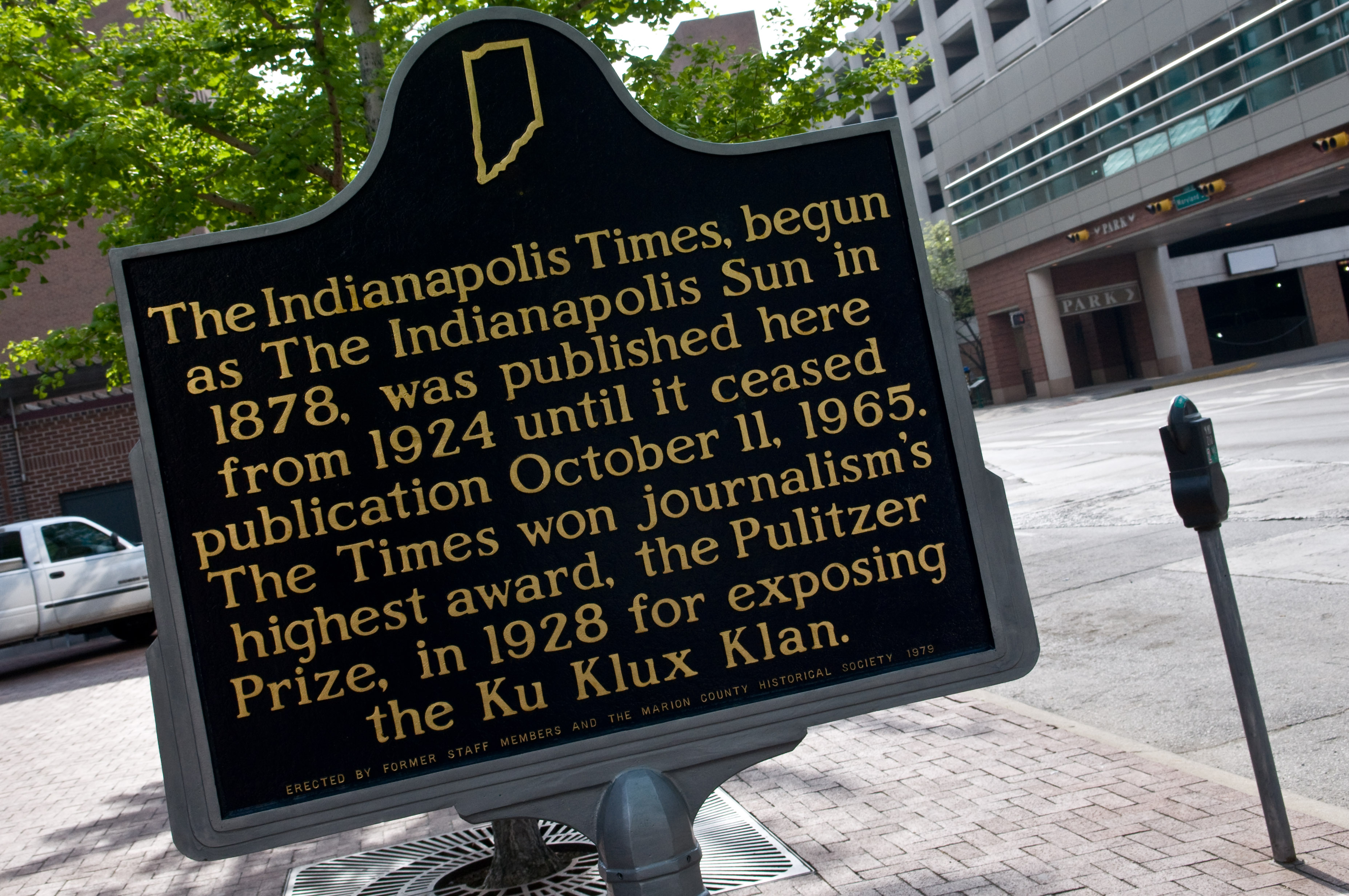
A historical marker for the Indianapolis Times in Indianapolis

The Indianapolis Times was recognized for "crusading" journalism and advocacy efforts. Story topics included voter fraud, state government financial scandals, falsely reported crime statistics, and improving public school lunches.

Under the leadership of editor Boyd Gurley, the Indianapolis Times received a Pulitzer Prize in 1928 for Public Service after it successfully exposed Ku Klux Klan involvement in state politics, including corruption between Governor Ed Jackson and Indiana Grand Dragon D.C. Stephenson.

During the Great Depression, the Times used its influence to raise money for charities that provided coats and other clothing items for children. In the 1960-1961 recession the Times ran free employment ads that helped 4,000 Hoosiers find jobs.

The competition from the Indianapolis News and Indianapolis Star proved to be too much for the Indianapolis Times. The newspaper ceased operations in October 1965, publishing its last issue on the 11th, with the daily circulation just below 90,000 and the Sunday circulation at 101,000.

There is a historical marker located at the site of the Times building in the 300 block of W. Maryland Street at Capitol Avenue in downtown Indianapolis. The Times building is long gone, but the marker honors the location and the paper's lasting positive civic impact.
