= Murder of Madge Oberholtzer =

American murder victim (1896–1925), cause of KKK decline

Madge Oberholtzer
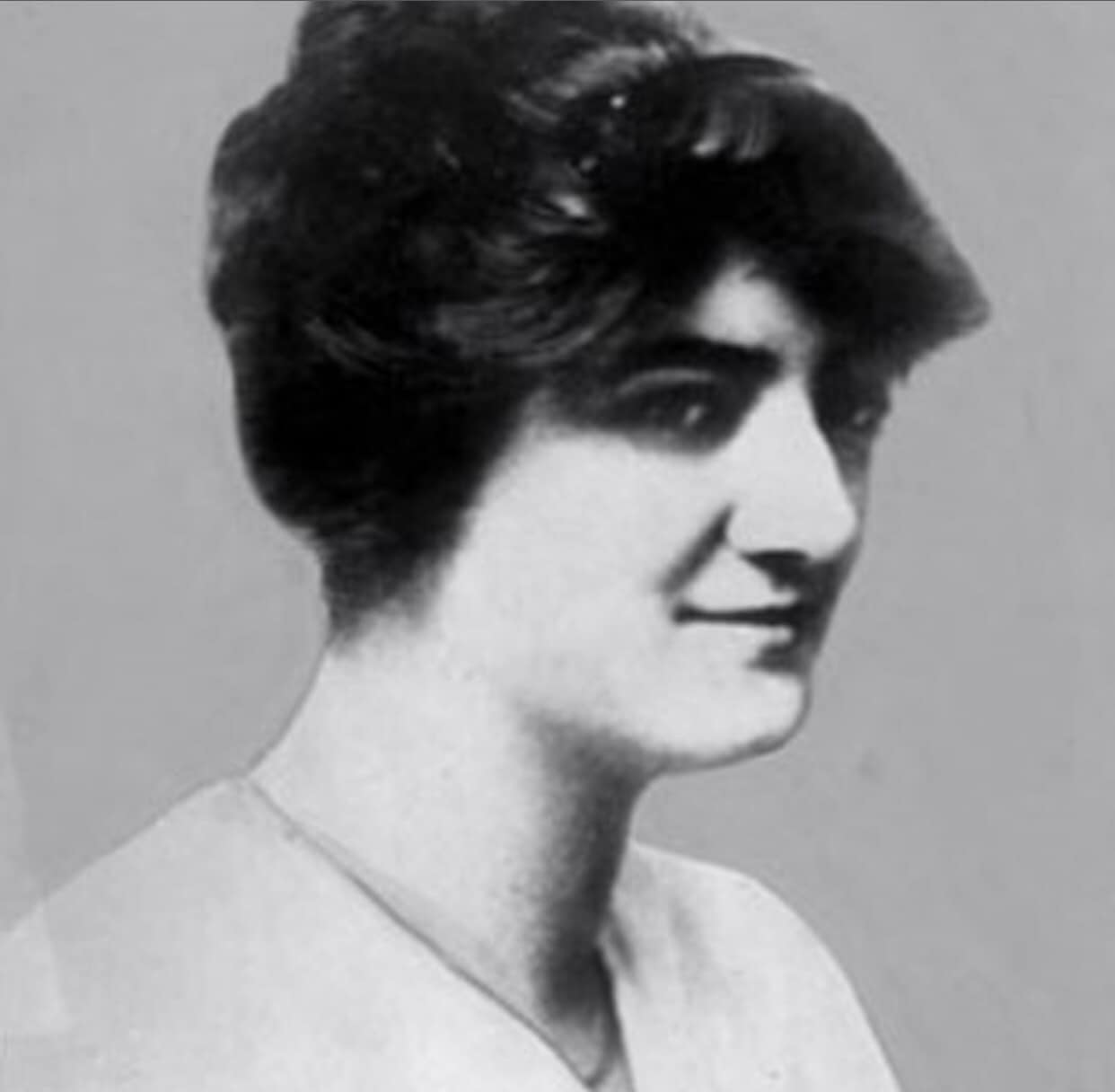
- Born: Madge Augustine Oberholtzer; November 10, 1896; Indianapolis, Indiana, U.S.
- Died: April 14, 1925 (aged 28); Indianapolis, Indiana, U.S.
- Cause of death: Homicide
- Known for: Murder victim

Madge Augustine Oberholtzer (November 10, 1896 – April 14, 1925) was an American woman whose rape and murder played a critical role in the demise of the second incarnation of the Ku Klux Klan. In March 1925, while working for the state of Indiana on an adult literacy campaign, Oberholtzer was abducted by D. C. Stephenson, Grand Dragon of the Indiana Klan. Holding her captive in his private train car, Stephenson raped and tortured her. Oberholtzer died from a combination of a staphylococcal infection from her injuries and kidney failure from mercury chloride poisoning, which she took while held captive in a suicide attempt.

Following the suicide attempt, Stephenson's men returned Oberholtzer to her home, assuming her injuries would soon prove fatal and believing their influential leader was immune to any prosecution. However, Oberholtzer regained consciousness long enough to give a signed statement to police. She described Stephenson's assaults, which led to his conviction at trial and the rapid decline of KKK membership in Indiana.

== Early life ==
Born to German-American parents, Madge Oberholtzer grew up in Indianapolis, where her father worked as a postal clerk and her family belonged to the Irvington Methodist Church. Oberholtzer studied English, mathematics, zoology and logic at Butler College in Irvington, but she dropped out at the end of her junior year without saying why. Throughout her life, she lived with her parents in Irvington. By the time she met Stephenson, Oberholtzer was the manager of the Indiana Young People's Reading Circle, a special section of the Indiana Department of Public Instruction. However, she heard rumors that her job and the Reading Circle program were about to be eliminated due to budget cuts.

== Chronology of the murder ==
Oberholtzer met Stephenson while attending Governor Edward L. Jackson's inauguration party at the Indianapolis Athletic Club on January 12, 1925 – just three months before he murdered her. In her dying statement, Oberholtzer claimed he asked her for a date several times after the banquet, but she refused; she eventually agreed and they had dinner together. Following that date, Stephenson called Oberholtzer on the phone several times. She finally agreed to meet him for dinner at the Washington Hotel.

The two began seeing each other more frequently, and Oberholtzer acted as Stephenson's aide during the 1925 session of the Indiana General Assembly, carrying messages from his office to his friends. She also helped him write a nutrition book, One Hundred Years of Health. Using her Reading Circle connections, Oberholtzer intended to help Stephenson sell the book to school libraries throughout the state. She ended their relationship after attending a party at his mansion.

About 10:00 pm on March 15, Oberholtzer returned home after an evening with a friend. Her mother told her that Stephenson's secretary had called and said he was leaving for Chicago, leaving a message to call him before he left. Oberholtzer called Stephenson, who told her he would try to protect the Reading Circle program and her job if she agreed to see him. She changed into a black velvet dress, and a bodyguard she identified as "Mr. Gentry" (his name was Earl Gentry) arrived and escorted her to Stephenson's mansion a few blocks away. When she arrived, Stephenson, Gentry, and another bodyguard Oberholtzer identified as "Clenck" took her into the kitchen and forced her to drink whiskey until she became sick. The three men then took her upstairs, and Stephenson took a revolver from a dresser drawer and forced her to approach him at gunpoint.

Oberholtzer said the men took her to the garage and forced her into Stephenson's car. Before they left, Stephenson told Clenck to stay behind and tell his associate, Claude Worley, that he was going to Chicago for a business meeting. When they reached the railroad station, Stephenson and Gentry forced Oberholtzer onto Stephenson's private train to Chicago. No sooner had they entered the train's compartment coach than Stephenson grabbed the bottom of her dress and pulled it over her head. He then grabbed her hands, tore off the rest of her clothes, pushed her into the lower bed, and raped her repeatedly. He also bit her all over her body; an examination later revealed deep bite wounds on her face, neck, breasts, back, legs, ankles, and tongue. Oberholtzer, still intoxicated and unable to resist, eventually passed out.

Upon waking, Oberholtzer confronted Stephenson and said, "The law will get their hands on you!" Because Stephenson's connections to the Indiana Klan gave him tremendous political power, he laughed and replied, "I am the law in Indiana." Gentry and Stephenson dressed Oberholtzer and told her they would be stopping in Hammond, where the three checked into the Indiana Hotel. Stephenson forced Oberholtzer to say that she was his wife so they could share the same room. He forced her to write a telegram to her mother, saying she had decided to go to Chicago with him. While Stephenson was sleeping, Oberholtzer grabbed his revolver to kill herself but changed her mind and instead, she decided to commit suicide by taking poison. She believed that this would save her mother from disgrace. The next morning, Oberholtzer convinced Stephenson to contact his chauffeur, Ernest "Shorty" DeFriese, and tell him to come to the hotel so she could purchase a black silk hat.

Upon purchasing the hat, Oberholtzer asked Shorty to drive her to a druggist to buy some rouge. She bought an entire box of mercuric chloride tablets. Oberholtzer returned to her room but, still weakened from the wounds Stephenson had inflicted on her, only managed to swallow three tablets. She vomited blood throughout the remainder of the day. Stephenson insisted that he would not take her to a hospital unless she agreed to go to a nearby chapel and marry him; however, he panicked and ordered Shorty to drive them back to Indianapolis. When he was asked what had happened, a bodyguard said she had been in a car accident.

Oberholtzer's parents immediately called a doctor, but nothing could be done to save her. On March 28, Oberholtzer explained what had happened to her in a signed statement. She died on April 14, 1925, from a staph infection from the bites, plus kidney failure from the mercury poisoning.

=== Trial ===
Stephenson was indicted on April 3, 1925, on charges of rape, kidnapping, assault and battery with intent to murder, and malicious mayhem. Earl Gentry and Earl Klinck were charged with first degree murder and conspiracy to commit kidnapping. The doctor who had examined Oberholtzer testified that the injuries she received were sufficient to have killed her, as her wounds developed an infection that reached her lungs and kidneys. Stephenson's attorney claimed Oberholtzer had committed suicide, saying the rapist could not have anticipated her behavior. The prosecution countered to the effect that, based on medical testimony, prompt medical attention might have saved her life. During closing statements, prosecutor Charles Cox decried Stephenson as a "destroyer of virtue and womanhood". He said he wanted all three men to be found guilty of first degree murder:

These men should be sent to the electric chair, the scaffold...

The jury found Stephenson guilty of second degree murder, rape, and kidnapping, and the court sentenced him to life in prison. Gentry and Klinck were acquitted. The Indiana Supreme Court rejected Stephenson's appeal. This case is still taught in law schools as showing an enlargement of the causal relationships that define homicide. The jury was later found to have been divided on Stephenson's fate. Four jurors had wanted to find him guilty of first degree murder and sentence him to death. The others wanted to find him guilty of second degree murder or manslaughter. Eventually, they compromised with a conviction for second degree murder.

=== Aftermath ===
The brutal attack on Oberholtzer so outraged most members of the Indiana Klan that entire lodges quit en masse, and membership dropped by the tens of thousands. The scandal destroyed the Klan in Indiana, and in the following two years, the KKK lost more than 178,000 members, nearly disappearing.

Denied a pardon in 1926, Stephenson started talking to the Indianapolis Times, giving the names of officials who had accepted bribes and payments from the Klan, prompting an investigation by the newspaper. The state of Indiana finally indicted several high-ranking officials, including Governor Edward L. Jackson and the head of the Republican Party in Marion County. Other local officials resigned when facing charges. The Times investigation revealed widespread political corruption, which helped destroy the Klan in Indiana and nationwide. By February 1928, Indiana Klan rosters had dropped to just 4,000, from a peak of more than 250,000 members in 1925.

In July 1934, Earl Gentry, 47, was shot and killed in Jefferson, Wisconsin. He had been living as a boarder with a woman named Carrie Gill for eight years. Carl Church, also known as George Slim King, confessed to having killed him after being paid $60 to do so by Gill. Church said he took Gentry "for a ride" and executed him gangland style. In his confession, he said he did not regret killing Gentry, who had been known as "Jefferson County's Public Enemy No. 1". Church said he was enraged after learning that Gentry had been mistreating Gill:

During the time I was working for Carrie I knew that Earl Gentry was mistreating her and she had black eyes on various occasions. This I didn't like as she was extremely good to me and treated me like my own mother.

Gentry had repeatedly been arrested for various charges. He had once got angry at a drinking companion's remarks and stabbed him to death. However, every time, he was released after none of the witnesses were willing to testify against him out of fear for potential reprisals. In this regard, Church said he had performed a service for society by killing Gentry:

He should have been killed a long time ago. I'm glad I did it I'd do it again. I got a million dollars worth of satisfaction out of removing him.

Several days later, Church pleaded guilty to first degree murder and was sentenced to life in prison. In October 1934, a jury acquitted Gill of murder. In 1935, her brother, Ferdinand, pleaded guilty to being an accessory to murder for helping bury the body and was fined $100. In 1942, Church had his life sentence commuted by Governor Julius P. Heil to make him immediately eligible for parole. He was released in 1944 and moved to California.

In 1928, Klinck was arrested on charges of forging the name of fellow Klansman William Rogers in a false affidavit claiming that several men had paid Rogers to testify that he saw Senator James E. Watson with a Ku Klux Klan card. Klinck was found guilty of being an accessory before the fact to the false attesting of an affidavit. He was sentenced to one to three years in prison and fined $100.

Stephenson was paroled on March 23, 1950, but he violated the conditions of his parole by disappearing around September 25 of that year. He was captured in Minneapolis on December 15, and was ordered by the court in 1951 to serve another ten years. He was paroled on December 22, 1956, on the condition that he leave Indiana and never return.

In 1961, Stephenson was arrested in Missouri at age 70 on charges of sexually assaulting a 16-year-old girl, but the charges were dropped on grounds of insufficient evidence. He died five years later.

== Representation in other media ==
- Actress Mel Harris portrayed Oberholtzer in the TV miniseries Cross of Fire (1989).

== See also ==
- List of kidnappings (1900–1949)
- List of solved missing person cases (pre-1950)
