= Indiana Klan =

Indiana branch of the Ku Klux Klan

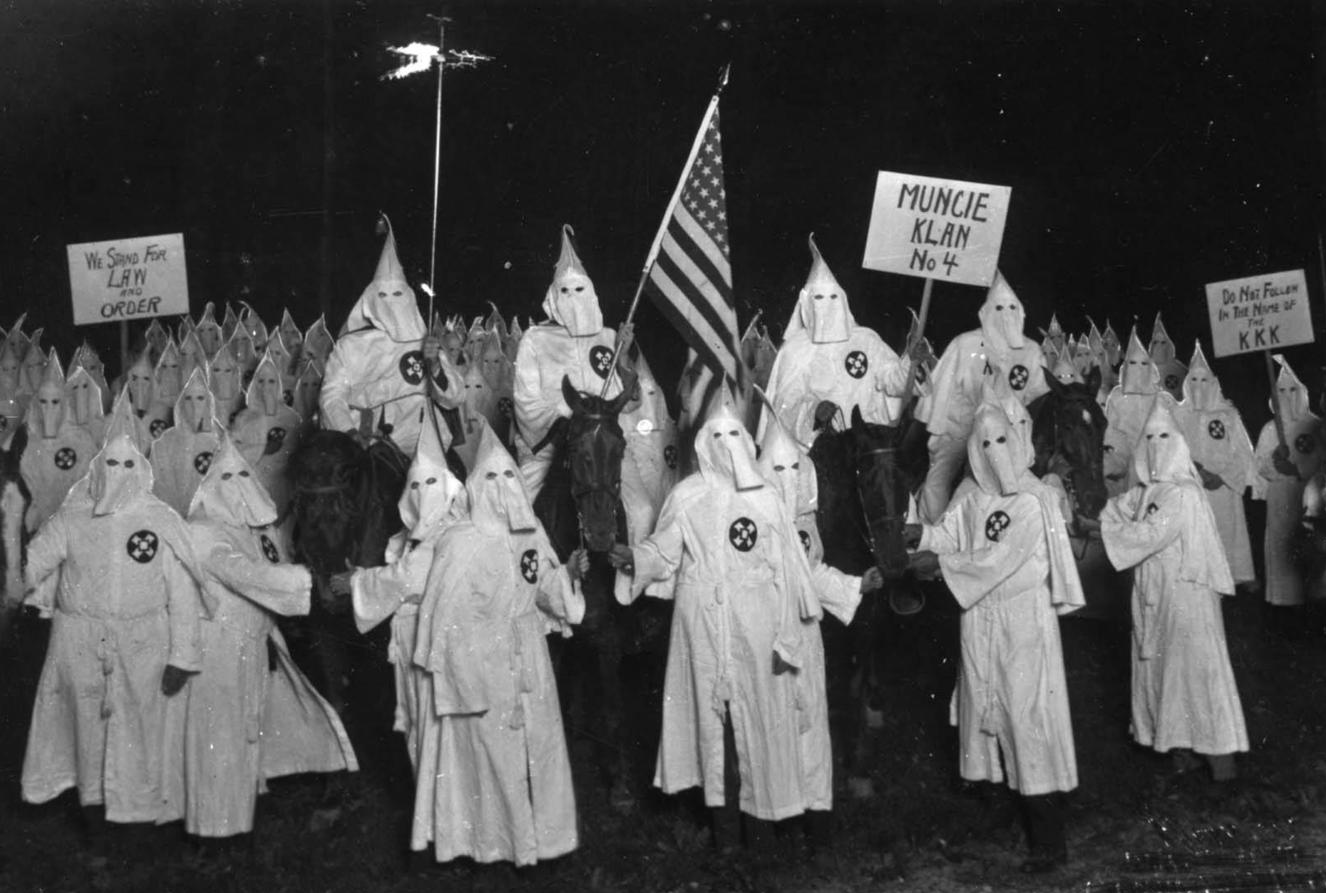
- An Indiana Klan gathering in Muncie, Indiana in 1922
- Formation: 1920
- Founder: Joe Huffington
- Founded at: Evansville, Indiana
- Dissolved: 1925
- Legal status: Defunct
- Region served: Indiana
- Members: 250,000 at its peak (30% of native-born Indiana male population) (2,000 new members per week between July 1922-July 1923 (peak year))
- Key people: D. C. Stephenson
- Parent organization: Ku Klux Klan

The Indiana Klan was the state of Indiana branch of the Ku Klux Klan (KKK), a secret society in the United States that formed in Georgia in 1915. It grew rapidly in the early 1920s all across the United States. It used very energetic paid organizers who formed local chapters, and were well paid when they collected membership fees. The state and national Klans made money by selling uniforms. The appeal was to promote ideas of religious superiority and affect public affairs on issues of patriotism and Protestantism, especially Prohibition, education, political corruption, and morality. Only white Protestant men could become members, and membership was kept secret. Historians, however, have discovered some local membership lists. The membership was a cross section of white Protestants in terms of class, education and income. The Indiana Klan was strongly hostile against Catholics who comprised 20% of the state population. It was nominally more hostile to African Americans and Jews, who each were 2% of the state's population. In Indiana, the Klan did not practice overt violence—it did not organize any lynchings—but did use intimidation in certain cases.

The Indiana Klan rose to prominence as the largest organization in Indiana very rapidly in the early 1920s. When white Protestants felt threatened by social and political issues, including changes caused by decades of immigration from southern and eastern Europe. By 1922 Indiana had the largest Klan organization of any U.S. state, and its membership continued to increase dramatically under the leadership of D. C. Stephenson. It averaged 2,000 new members per week from July 1922 to July 1923, the month when Stephenson was appointed Grand Dragon of Indiana. He led the Indiana Klan, and other KKK chapters he supervised, to break away from the national organization in late 1923.

Indiana's Klan was one of the strongest in the country, with about 30 percent of the entire White Protestant male population being members. At state and local elections the KKK leaders publicly endorsed candidates, and the endorsements proved effective. By 1925, over half the members of the Indiana General Assembly, the Governor of Indiana, and many other high-ranking officials in local and state government enjoyed support from the Klan. Politicians learned they needed the Klan's endorsement to win office. However, the KKK leadership was primarily interested in its own personal profits, and was unable to agree on legislative priorities. As a result, the state KKK failed to get any laws passed (with one uncontroversial exception).

In 1925 Stephenson was charged and convicted for the rape and murder of Madge Oberholtzer, a young schoolteacher. His vile behavior caused a sharp drop in Klan membership, which decreased further with his exposure to the press of secret deals and the Klan's bribery of public officials. Denied pardon, in 1927 Stephenson began to talk to the Indianapolis Times, giving them lists of people who had been paid by the Klan. Their press investigation exposed many Klan members, showed they were not law-abiding, and ended the power of the organization, as members dropped out by the tens of thousands. By the end of the decade, the Klan was down to about 4,000 members and it never recovered.

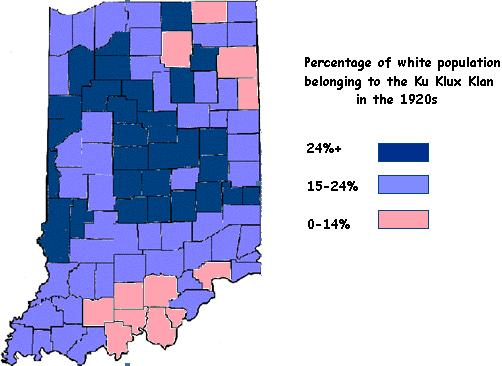
Population of white male residents of each Indiana county who belonged to the Klan during the 1920s

== Formation ==
In 1920, Imperial Wizard William J. Simmons of Atlanta, Georgia chose Joe Huffington to start an official Indiana chapter of the Ku Klux Klan. Huffington left for Indiana and set up his first headquarters in Evansville.

Huffington met D.C. Stephenson, a fellow war veteran with a background in Texas and Oklahoma, who quickly became one of the leading members of the chapter. Stephenson moved during 1920 to Evansville, Indiana, where he worked for a retail coal company. He joined the Democratic Party and in 1922, ran unsuccessfully for a Democratic Congressional nomination. He was said to have already married and abandoned two wives before settling in Evansville.

Stephenson was extraordinarily successful in recruiting and organizing new members. Like other agents, Stephenson got to keep a portion of the entrance fees, and began to amass wealth. Entrance in the Klan cost $10, plus dues, and the recruiter personally kept $4 of each registration. It is estimated that Stephenson made between two and five million dollars from his position in the Klan. Stephenson was an active recruiter. He initially stressed the concept of the Klan as a fraternal society and brotherhood, organized for civic activism, to help the poor and defend morality. He gained the support of many ministers and church congregations for these appeals to populist issues, and the Klan grew rapidly in Indiana.

== Rise to power (1922–1925) ==
The Evansville Klavern became the most powerful in the state, and Stephenson soon contributed to attracting numerous new members. More than 5,400 men, or 23 percent of the native-born white men in Vanderburgh County, ultimately joined the Klan.

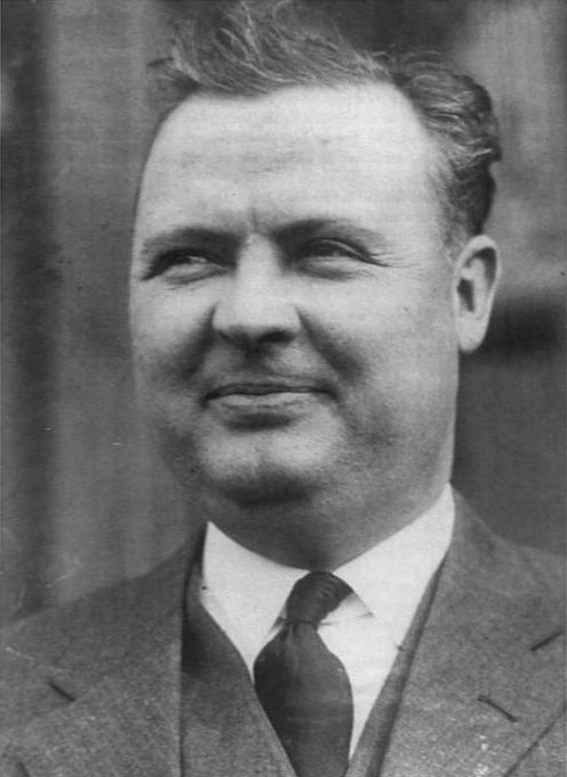
D.C. Stephenson, Grand Wizard of the Ku Klux Klan in Indiana and other northern states during the height of Klan power in the 1920s

Building on the momentum, Stephenson set up a base in Indianapolis, where he helped create the Klan's state's weekly newspaper, Fiery Cross. He quickly recruited new agents and organizers, building on news about the organization. Protestant ministers were offered free memberships. From July 1922 to July 1923, nearly 2,000 new members joined the Klan in Indiana each week. Hiram Wesley Evans, who led recruiting for the national organization, maintained close ties to state leaders throughout 1921–1922 and especially to Stephenson, as Indiana by then had the largest state organization. Stephenson backed Evans in November 1922 when he unseated William J. Simmons as Imperial Wizard of the national KKK. Evans had ambitions to make the Klan a political force in the country.

Klansmen in the Indiana General Assembly passed a bill in 1922 that created a Klan Day at the Indiana State Fair, complete with a nighttime cross burning. Governor Warren T. McCray vetoed the bill, beginning his public resistance to the Klan; he was the highest-ranking official to oppose them. The same year Edward L. Jackson, a Klan supporter who had been elected as the Secretary of State, granted the Klan a state charter. McCray demanded the charter be revoked because the leaders of the Klan did not reveal themselves to sign the document. Jackson refused to revoke the charter. Stephenson secretly ordered Jackson to offer McCray a $10,000 bribe to try to end his anti-Klan stance. McCray was personally wealthy and he refused the bribe.

In November 1922, Hiram Wesley Evans took power as the new Imperial Wizard in Atlanta, with the support of Stephenson. As a reward and in recognition of Stephenson's recruiting success, Evans appointed Stephenson as Grand Dragon of the Indiana Klan and head of recruiting for seven states north of Mississippi. Evans announced the promotion during a 1923 Fourth of July gathering of the Klan in Kokomo, Indiana, with more than 100,000 members and their families attending. Stephenson said,

My worthy subjects, citizens of the Invisible Empire, Klansmen all, greetings. It grieves me to be late. The President of the United States kept me unduly long counseling on matters of state. Only my plea that this is the time and the place of my coronation obtained for me surcease from his prayers for guidance.

Encouraged by his success, in September 1923, Stephenson severed his ties with the existing national organization of the KKK, and formed a rival KKK made up of the chapters he led. That year Stephenson changed his affiliation from the Democratic to the Republican Party, which predominated in Indiana and much of the Midwest. He notably supported his friend Republican Edward L. Jackson, when he ran (successfully) for governor in 1924.

=== Political agenda and rhetoric ===
The Klan's rhetoric was anti-Catholic and to a lesser extent anti-Semitic. Klan rhetoric alleged that the Catholics were only obedient to the Pope and they were behind secret plots to overthrow the government and exterminate Protestants.

Women of the Ku Klux Klan, Muncie, Indiana, 1924

The Indiana Klan mostly stressed social issues, as it promised to uphold moral standards, help enforce Prohibition, and end political corruption. The Klan also publicly attacked adulterers, gamblers, and undisciplined youths. This moralistic focus attracted support from religious leaders, particularly those active in the Temperance movement. Daisy Douglas Barr, who had risen to political prominence through the successful campaign to ban alcohol in the city of Muncie nearly a decade earlier, became a vocal supporter of the Indiana Klan. Appointed by Stephenson as Imperial Empress of the Klan in 1923, Barr's public persona was crucial to expanding the Klan's support among women, who were encouraged to join a separate women's auxiliary.

The Klan members wanted to close down Catholic parochial schools, and remove all Catholic influence from public schools. The Klan was unable to attain either goal, but attained support for their agenda from key leaders. Samuel Ralston delivered an anti-Catholic speech in 1922 which the Klan reproduced and spread across the state. With their support, he was elected to the United States Senate in 1923.

=== Peak of influence ===
At the height of its power, the Klan had over 250,000 members. The highest concentration was in cities in the central part of the state. Klan membership was discouraged in some parts of the state; in New Albany, for instance, city leaders denounced the Klan and discouraged residents from joining. Other cities, including Indianapolis, were almost completely controlled by the Klan, and election to public office was impossible without their support. Violence was rare; a street fight occurred in South Bend when Catholic college students from Notre Dame tried to break up a Klan parade in 1924.

Unable to bring Governor McCray to their side, leaders in the Indiana Klan worked to uncover dirt on McCray to force him out of office. They uncovered loans solicited by McCray in a questionable way. Because the solicitations were sent by mail, they were subject to federal mail fraud laws. The Klan leaders used their influence to have McCray tried, convicted, and imprisoned for mail fraud, forcing him to resign from office in 1924.

The Klan had a large budget, based on membership fees and costume sales. A large part of these funds went to philanthropy, but millions were also poured into bribing public officials, paying off enemies, and contributing to political campaigns. The Klan became so powerful, and Stephenson so influential, that, by 1925, he began to brag, saying "I am the law in Indiana."

== Scandal ==
In 1925, Stephenson, the head of the Indiana Klan, met Madge Oberholtzer, the head of the state's commission to combat illiteracy. During the night of the inaugural ball of Republican Governor Edward L. Jackson, she was abducted from her home, taken to the Indianapolis train station, and held in a private railroad car. On the train to Hammond, Stephenson repeatedly raped her and bit her. In Hammond, she pleaded the need to get to a drug store, where she secretly ate mercury bichloride tablets. Using the illness which was brought on by the poisons as an excuse, she begged Stephenson to release her. He took her back to Indianapolis and held her at his place. After Oberholtzer refused to marry him several days later, he had her returned to her home and secretly placed in bed. When her parents found her, the young woman was nearly dead. Taken to the hospital, Oberholtzer died about a month later. She told her story in detail to several witnesses. Stephenson was immediately arrested and charged with second-degree murder. The attending doctor, who testified during the trial, said that Oberholtzer's wounds appeared as if a cannibal had chewed her. The prosecution claimed that the wounds and the mercury had both caused the death of Oberholtzer. Stephenson was convicted, and the State Supreme Court upheld the decision in Stephenson v. State. He was sentenced to prison, serving time until 1956, when he was granted parole.

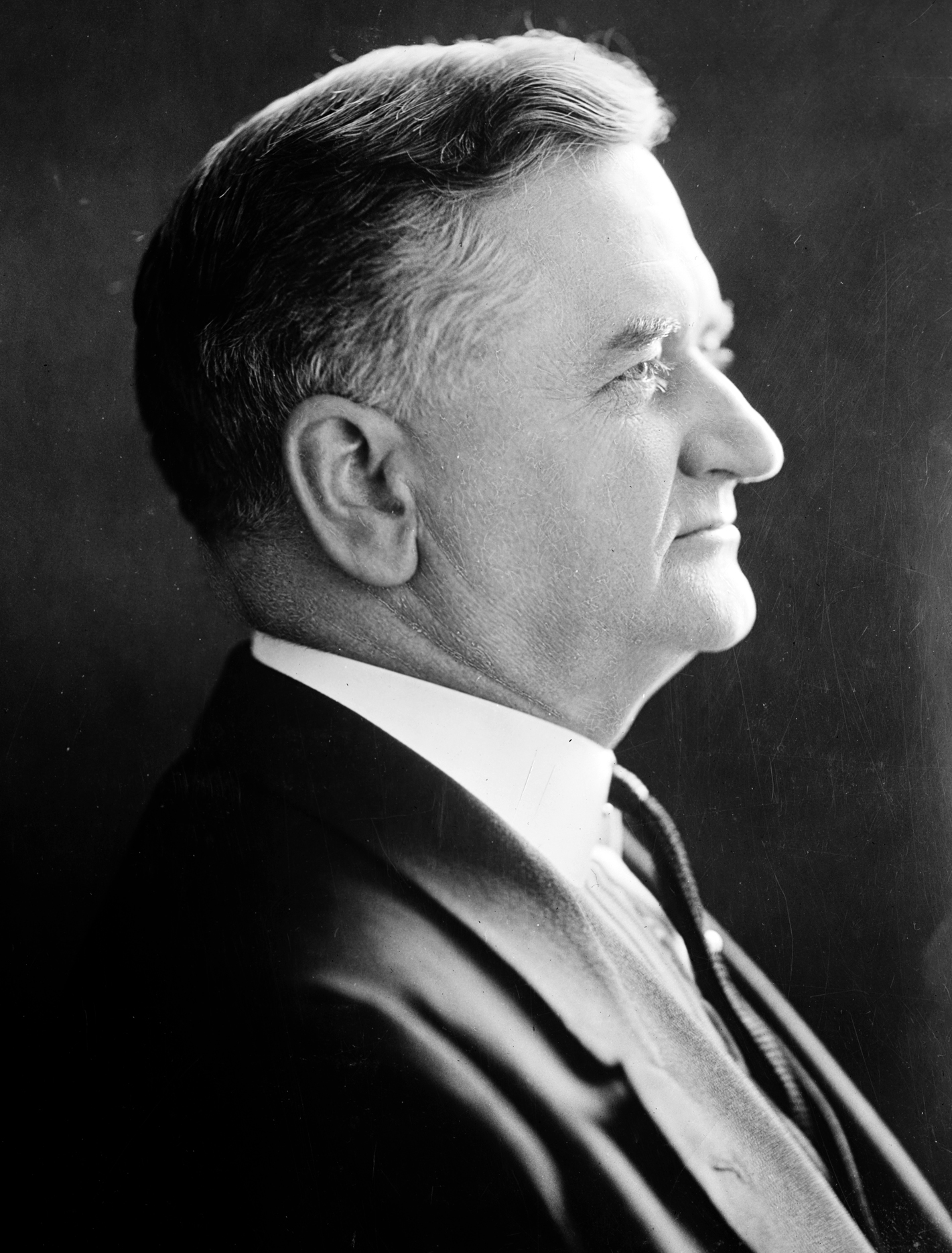
Edward L. Jackson, the 32nd Governor of Indiana, who had the strong support of the Indiana Klan in the 1920s

Denied a pardon by Governor Jackson, whom he had supported during his campaign for governor, Stephenson began to talk to reporters for the Indianapolis Times and expose many of the high-profile members of the Klan in 1926. Stephenson gave the reporters the names of politicians and officials whom the Klan had bribed, and the names of politicians and officials who had accepted money from the Klan. The mayor of Indianapolis, John Duvall, was jailed for thirty days and later, he was convicted of bribery. Numerous commissioners and other local leaders across the state were charged with bribery and forced to resign, stemming from their acceptance of support from the Klan. Governor Jackson was charged with bribery for his role in attempting to influence McCray. The court found that the charges against Jackson were true, but it judged him not guilty, because the statute of limitations on his crimes had expired. He ended his term and did not seek re-election. He was disgraced and never held public office again. Many other leaders of the Klan were arrested and tried on charges of conspiracy to bribe public officials.

== Aftermath ==
The Stephenson rape case and the ensuing bribery scandal both destroyed the Klan's image as the defender of women and justice. Members of the Klan withdrew from the organization by the tens of thousands. The Indianapolis Times, which won a Pulitzer Prize in 1928 for its investigation, and other newspapers throughout the state revealed that more than half of the members of the Indiana General Assembly were Klan members. Most swiftly renounced their former affiliations with the Klan, as "[w]hite robes and membership lists" quickly disappeared into "attics and trash piles."

The Klan did not disappear from Indiana entirely, however. From 1929 through 1933, Roy Davis lived in Jeffersonville, Indiana. Davis was a founding member of the 1915 revitalization of the Klan, and he would later become the National Imperial Wizard of the Original Knights of the KKK in 1959.

Although there was an effort to revive the Klan in Indiana during the 1960s and 1970s, when changing social values, the Vietnam War, urban riots and industrial restructuring caused widespread economic and social disruption, the organization never regained either the members or the power which it held during the 1920s. Nevertheless, a Klan office in Greenwood, a suburb just south of Indianapolis, continued to publish extensive recruiting materials for decades, including mailed pamphlets introducing the group and its mission.

The historian James H. Madison cautions that the Klan

cannot be dismissed as either an aberration or as simply the insidious appeal of a fanatical few. Nor should the Klan be seen as thoroughly dominating the state and accurately reflecting racist, violent, or provincial beliefs shared for all time by all Hoosiers.

== See also ==
- History of Indiana
- History of the Ku Klux Klan in New Jersey
- Indiana White Caps
- List of Ku Klux Klan organizations
- Women of the Klan: Racism and Gender in the 1920s by Kathleen M. Blee.

== Sources and further reading ==
- Burns, Robert E. Being Catholic, Being American: The Notre Dame Story, 1842-1934. Vol. 1 (University of Notre Dame Press, 1999), scholarly study; pp. 265–346 covers the KKK in state politics, and pp 310–321 covers the confrontation with Notre Dame students on May 17–18, 1924.
- Campney, Brent M. S. Hostile Heartland: Racism, Repression, and Resistance in the Midwest (Urbana: University of Illinois Press, 2019). online
- Egan, Timothy (2023). A Fever in the Heartland: The Ku Klux Klan's Plot to Take Over America, and the Woman Who Stopped Them. Penguin. ISBN 978-0735225268.
- Gray, Ralph D. (1995). Indiana History: A Book of Readings. Indiana: Indiana University Press. ISBN 0-253-32629-X.
- Gugin, Linda C.; St. Clair, James E, eds. (2006). The Governors of Indiana. Indianapolis, IN: Indiana Historical Society Press. ISBN 0-87195-196-7.
- Lutholtz, M. William. Grand Dragon: D. C. Stephenson and the Ku Klux Klan in Indiana (Purdue University Press, 1991). description, a scholarly study.
- Madison, James H. Indiana through Tradition and Change: A history of the Hoosier State and its People, 1920–1945 (1982). pp. 43–71.
- Madison, James H. The Ku Klux Klan in the Heartland (Indiana University Press, 2020), the major scholarly study of KKK in Indiana.
- Madison, James H. "The Klan's Enemies Step Up, Slowly". Indiana Magazine of History 116.2 (2020): 93–120. doi: 10.2979/indimagahist.116.2.01 focus on historiography versus myths
- Melton, Zachary. "Notices of Doubtful Value: The Legacy of Arthur Middleton Reeves." Indiana Magazine of History 121.4 (2025): 249–285. excerpt
- Moore, Leonard J. Citizen Klansmen: The Ku Klux Klan in Indiana, 1921–1928, Chapel Hill: University of North Carolina Press, 1997. a major scholarly study based on statistical analysis of formerly secret membership lists..
- Rooney, Jacob. "Protestant Resistance and Catholic Resilience: The Notre Dame Riot of 1924." Tenor of Our Times 14.1 (2025): 13+ online.
- Safianow, Allen. "‘You Can’t burn History’: Getting Right with the Klan in Noblesville, Indiana," Indiana Magazine of History 100 (June 2004), 111–154.
- Snyder, Kelsey A. "Sundown in Indiana: A Midwest Story of Racism, Exclusion, and Memory." (Thesis, James Madison University, 2025) . online
- Tucker, Richard K. The Dragon and the Cross: the Rise and Fall of the Ku Klux Klan in Middle America (. Hamden, Conn: Archon Books, 1991). online
- Tucker, Todd. Notre Dame vs. The Klan: How the Fighting Irish Defied the KKK. (2004, 2018), a partly fictionalized account.
