= D. C. Stephenson =

American murderer and Ku Klux Klan leader (1891–1966)

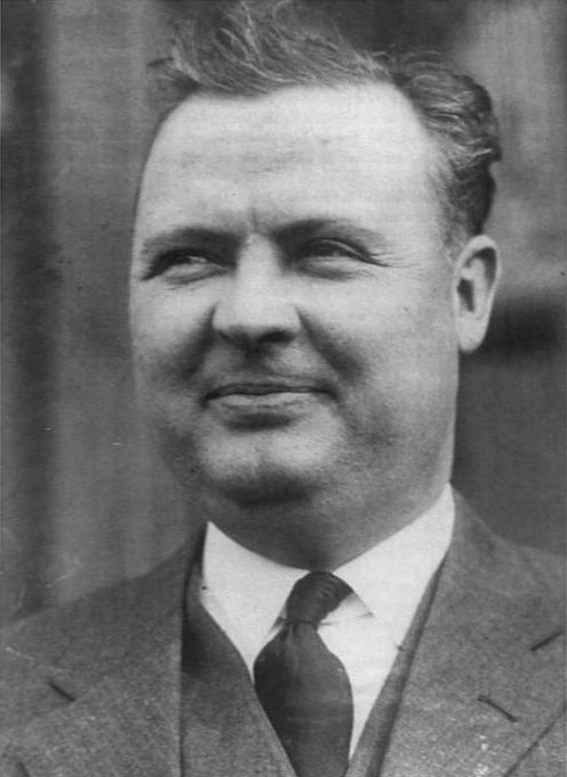
- Stephenson in 1922
- Born: David Curtis Stephenson; August 21, 1891; Houston, Texas, U.S.
- Died: June 28, 1966 (aged 74); Jonesborough, Tennessee, U.S.
- Resting place: Mountain Home National Cemetery
- Political party: Republican (after 1921)
- Other political affiliations: Democratic (before 1921)
- Spouses: Nettie Hamilton; Violet Carroll; Martha Dickinson; Martha Murray Sutton
- Children: 1
- Status: Deceased
- Conviction: Second degree murder
- Penalty: Life imprisonment

Details
- Victims: Madge Augustine Oberholtzer, aged 28
- Date: April 14, 1925
- Locations: Indianapolis, Indiana, U.S.

David Curtis "Steve" Stephenson (August 21, 1891 – June 28, 1966) was an American Ku Klux Klan (KKK) leader, convicted rapist and murderer. In 1923, he was appointed Grand Dragon of the Indiana Klan and head of Klan recruiting for seven other states. Later that year, he led those groups to independence from the national KKK organization. Amassing wealth and political power in Indiana politics, he was one of the most prominent national Klan leaders. He had close relationships with numerous Indiana politicians, especially Governor Edward L. Jackson.

In Stephenson v. State (1925), Stephenson was tried for and convicted of the abduction, rape, and murder of Madge Oberholtzer, a state education official. His trial, conviction, and imprisonment were a severe blow to the public perception of Klan leaders as law abiding. The case destroyed the Klan as a political force in Indiana, and significantly damaged its standing nationally. Denied a pardon by Governor Jackson, in 1927, he started talking with reporters for the Indianapolis Times and released a list of elected and other officials who had been in the pay of the Klan. This led to a wave of indictments in Indiana, more national scandals, the rapid loss of tens of thousands of members, and the end of the second wave of Klan activity in the late 1920s.

Stephenson served a total of 31 years in prison for Oberholtzer's murder and for violating his parole after being released. His burial in USVA Mountain Home National Cemetery in Johnson City, Tennessee, led to Congress passing restrictions barring serious sex offenders or those convicted of capital crimes from burial in veterans' cemeteries.

== Early life and education ==
David Curtis Stephenson was born in Houston, Texas, on August 21, 1891, and moved as a child with his family to Maysville, Oklahoma. After some public schooling, he started work as a printer's apprentice.

During World War I, he enlisted in the Army and completed officers' training. He never served overseas, but his training proved useful when he organized and led groups.

Timothy Egan's A Fever in the Heartland, published in 2023, states that Stephenson avoided the draft by joining the Iowa National Guard, where he was apparently despised by the other recruits. According to Egan, Stephenson's service in the Army and officer's training were both pure fiction.

== Klansman ==
In 1920 at the age of 29, he moved to Evansville, Indiana, where he worked for a retail coal company. He joined the Democratic Party that same year. In 1922, he ran unsuccessfully for the Democratic congressional nomination for Indiana's 1st congressional district, placing third behind William E. Wilson and Edward E. Meyer. Part of his election loss was due to opposition from the Anti-Saloon League, which would later cause him to change his party affiliation from Democratic to Republican in 1922. He had already married and abandoned two women before settling in Evansville.

Joseph M. Huffington, whom the Ku Klux Klan had sent from Texas as an agent for organizing in Evansville, recruited Stephenson to the group's inner circle. The historian Leonard Moore characterized them both as young men on the make. The Evansville Klavern became the most powerful in the state, and Stephenson soon contributed to attracting numerous new members. For example, more than 5,400 men, or 23 percent of the native-born white men in Evansville, joined the Klan.

Building on the momentum, Stephenson set up a base in Indianapolis, where he helped create the Klan's weekly newspaper, Fiery Cross. He quickly recruited new agents and organizers, building on news about the organization. Protestant ministers were offered free membership, and many recommended the new organization. From July 1922 to July 1923, nearly 2,000 new members joined the Klan each week in Indiana. Hiram Wesley Evans, who led recruiting for the national organization, maintained close ties to state leaders throughout 1921–1922 and he was especially close to Stephenson, because by then, Indiana had the largest state Klan organization. Stephenson backed Evans in November 1922 when he unseated William J. Simmons as Imperial Wizard of the national KKK. Evans had ambitions to make the Klan a political force in the country.

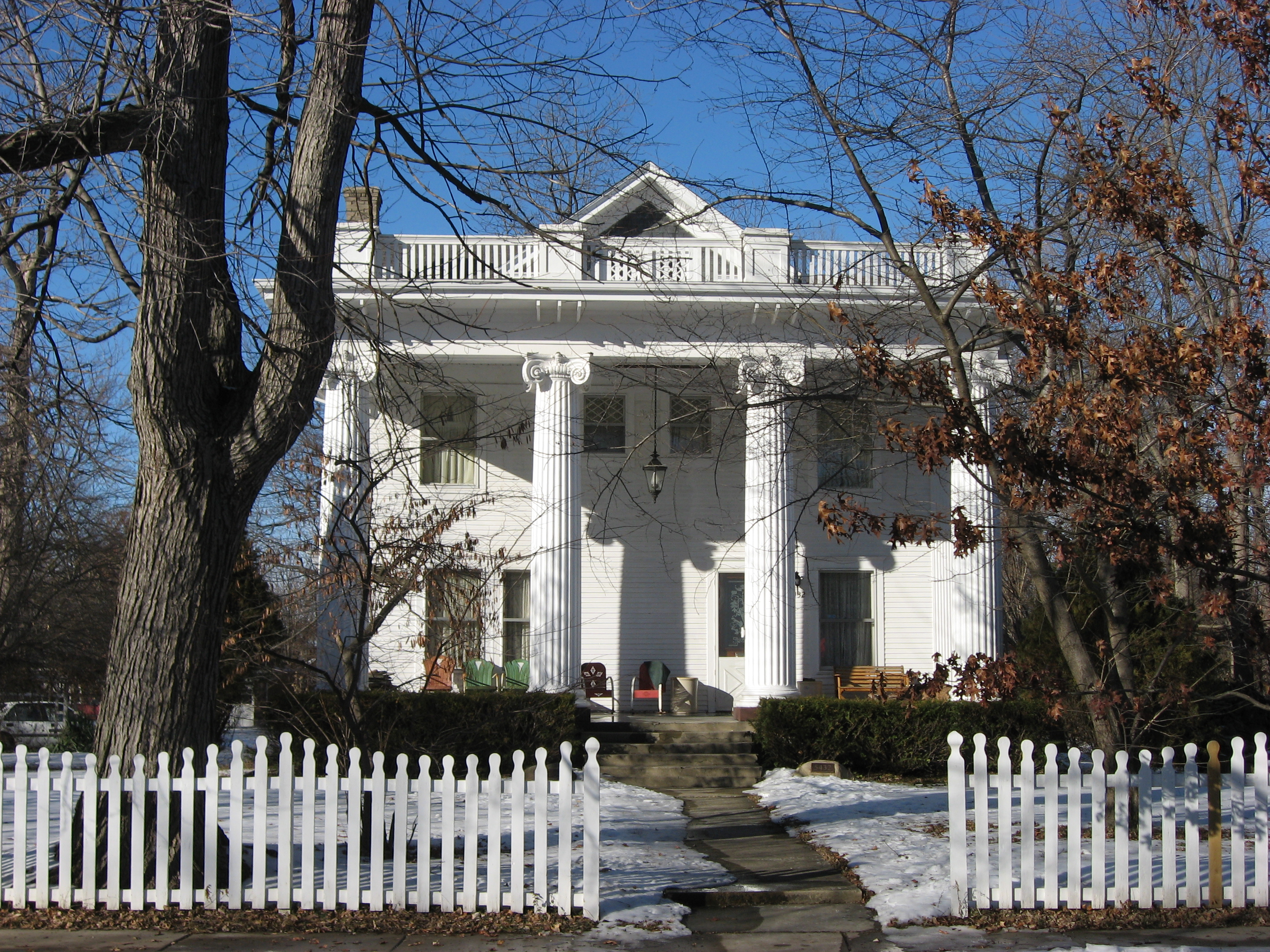
Stephenson lived in the William H. H. Graham House in Indianapolis in the 1920s.

After Evans won, he officially appointed Stephenson as Grand Dragon of Indiana. He also made him head of recruiting for seven other states north of Mississippi. In the 1920s, Klan membership grew dramatically in these states. In Indiana, membership grew to nearly 250,000 or about one third of all white males in the state. Stephenson acquired great wealth and political power by leading the Klan; agents received a portion of $25 initiation fee paid by new recruits, and he began to wield other powers. Evans, who had a monopoly on the sale of Klan uniforms and paraphernalia, appointed Stephenson as Grand Dragon of the Indiana Klan at a 1923 Fourth of July rally of the Klan in Kokomo, Indiana, with more than 100,000 members and their families in attendance. Stephenson at the rally falsely claimed presidential favor:

My worthy subjects, citizens of the Invisible Empire, Klansmen all, greetings. It grieves me to be late. The President of the United States kept me unduly long counseling on matters of state. Only my plea that this is the time and the place of my coronation obtained for me surcease from his prayers for guidance.

Evans and Stephenson's relationship soon deteriorated. Evans responded by attempting to remove Stephenson as Grand Dragon in 1923 but Stephenson refused to step down. Encouraged by his success, in September 1923, Stephenson severed his ties with the existing national organization of the KKK, and formed a rival KKK that was made up of the chapters which he led. To bolster his legitimacy, Stephenson realigned with William Joseph Simmons and the original leaders of the national organization that had been ousted by Evans in 1922.

In 1922, Stephenson changed his affiliation from the Democratic to the Republican Party, which was predominant in Indiana. Stephenson directed his statewide machine from offices in Indianapolis, Funding came from his share of the initiation fees as well as from his share of the $10 for Klan uniforms which was paid by new members. To develop a screening process, he relied on his network of paid Klan organizers in each county. He then created information sheets that contained the names of the candidates who he recommended that his supporters should vote for in both the Republican and Democratic primaries, as well as in the general elections. When Ed Jackson ran for governor in 1924, he cut a deal in exchange for Stephenson's assistance. Stephenson sent out 225,000 letters to Hoosiers in which he urged them to vote for Jackson in the Republican primary. During the 1924 election, candidates who were endorsed by Stephenson, including Jackson, won by significant margins. However, they won fewer votes than Republican President Calvin Coolidge received in his reelection campaign.

On May 12, 1924, at an assembly in the Cadle Tabernacle in Indianapolis, Stephenson pontificated:

God help the man who issues a proclamation of war against the Klan in Indiana now ... We are going to Klux Indiana as she has never been Kluxed before ... I'll appeal to the ministers of Indiana to do the praying for the Ku Klux Klan and I'll do the scrapping for it ... And the fiery cross is going to burn at every crossroads in Indiana, as long as there is a white man left in the state.

Stephenson frequently boasted, "I am the law in Indiana." Nevertheless, when the 1925 state Legislature met, factionalism, confusion, and his poor leadership resulted in an almost total failure to pass significant legislation. The one exception was the success of the Anti-Saloon League in passing one of the strongest anti-liquor laws in the United States.

== Murder of Madge Oberholtzer ==
Publicly a Prohibitionist and a defender of "Protestant womanhood," Stephenson was tried in 1925 for the rape and murder of Madge Oberholtzer, a young state employee who ran a state program to combat adult illiteracy. During the trial, the Klan's image as upholders of law and morality was gravely weakened as it was proven that Stephenson and many of his associates were in private womanizers and alcoholics. The scandal of the charges and trial led to the rapid decline in the "Second Wave" of Klan activity. Stephenson was convicted of the abduction, forced intoxication, and rape of Oberholtzer; as his abuse had led to a suicide attempt while she was still in his captivity, which eventually caused Oberholtzer's death, Stephenson was also charged and convicted of murder.

Stephenson had bitten her many times during his attack, and witnesses said it appeared as if she had been "chewed by a cannibal." The attending doctor described her condition as including a deep bite on her breast. He later testified that the bite wounds which Stephenson inflicted on her were the leading contributor to her death due to a staph infection that eventually reached her lungs. The doctor also testified that she could have been saved if she had been given medical attention sooner. In her dying declaration, Oberholtzer claimed that Stephenson had refused to give her medical attention unless she agreed to marry him first. The jury convicted Stephenson of second-degree murder on November 14, 1925, on its first ballot. Stephenson was sentenced to life in prison on November 16, 1925.

After the conviction, Governor Jackson refused to grant Stephenson clemency or commute his sentence. Stephenson retaliated by releasing secret lists of public officials who had received Klan payments or bribes. The Indianapolis Times interviewed Stephenson and proceeded with an extended investigation of the Klan's political ties. (The Times won the 1928 Pulitzer Prize for Public Service for its investigative reporting.) This publicity and the state's crackdown on Klan activity sped up the decline of the organization by the end of the 1920s. The KKK suffered a dramatic nationwide loss of reputation and its membership rapidly fell from 5 million in 1925; few Klan members remained in the organization's former Midwestern stronghold.

The state filed indictments against top politicians including Governor Jackson; George V. "Cap" Coffin, chairman of the Marion County Republican Party; and attorney Robert I. Marsh, charging them with conspiring to bribe Governor Warren McCray. The mayor of Indianapolis, John Duvall, was convicted and sentenced to jail for 30 days (and barred from political service for four years). Some Republican commissioners of Marion County resigned from their posts after being charged with accepting bribes from the Klan and Stephenson.

== Later years ==
On January 7, 1941, the Valparaiso Vidette-Messenger reported that Governor M. Clifford Townsend was considering granting an early parole to Stephenson. No parole was approved that year. Stephenson was paroled on March 23, 1950, but violated parole by disappearing on or before September 25, 1950. On December 15, 1950, he was captured in Minneapolis, Minnesota, and returned to custody. He was sentenced in 1951 to serve 10 years in prison. In 1953, he pleaded for release, denying that he had been a leader of the Klan.

On December 22, 1956, the state paroled him on condition that he leave Indiana and never return. Stephenson moved to Seymour, Indiana, where he soon married Martha Dickinson. They were separated in 1962 when he left and never returned.

Stephenson then moved to Jonesborough, Tennessee (briefly spelled as Jonesboro during this time), where he was employed at the Herald & Tribune newspaper, and where he entered into a bigamous marriage with Martha Murray Sutton without having been divorced from Dickinson.

In 1961, at the age of 70, Stephenson was arrested in Independence, Missouri, on charges of attempting to sexually assault a 16-year-old girl. He was released after paying a $300 fine when the charges were dropped on grounds of insufficient evidence, but was ordered to leave Missouri immediately.

== Death ==
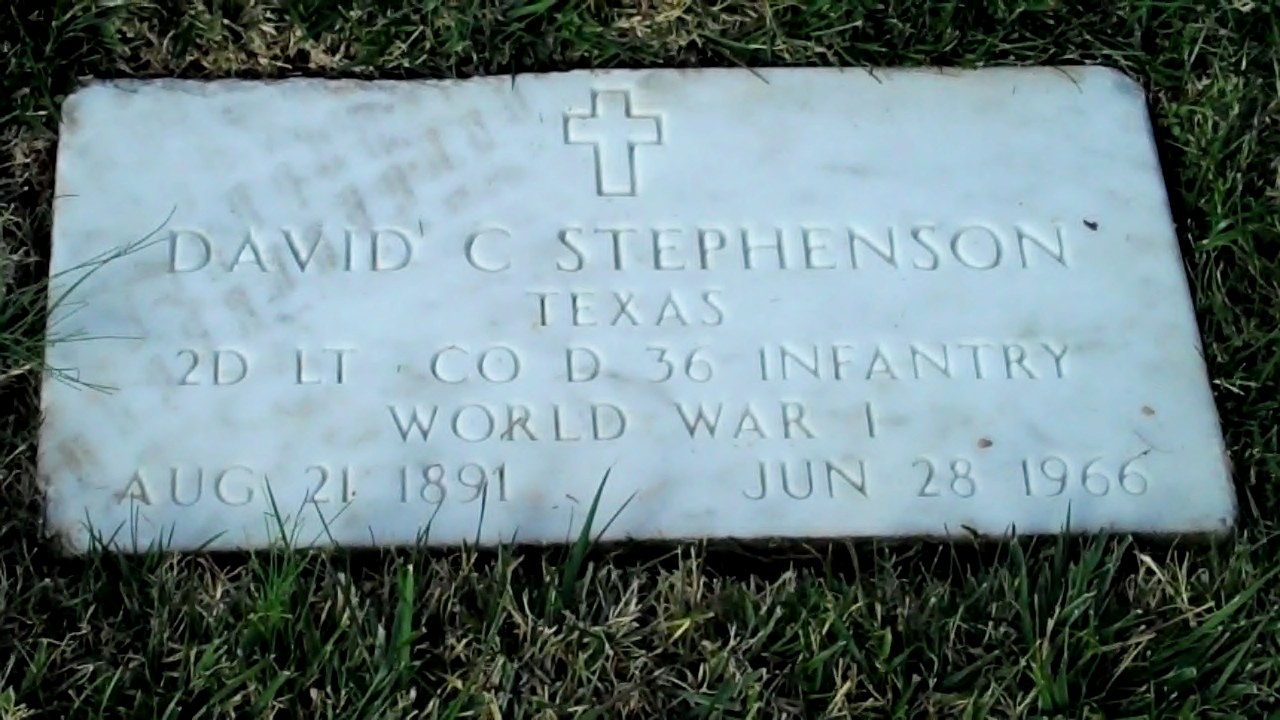
Grave marker located at USVA Mountain Home National Cemetery in Johnson City, Tennessee

A few years later, in 1966, Stephenson died at his home in Jonesborough, Tennessee, and as an honorably discharged veteran, he was buried in the USVA Mountain Home National Cemetery in Johnson City, Tennessee. Congress later passed restrictions that bar serious sex offenders and individuals who have been convicted of capital crimes from burial in veterans' cemeteries.

His legal wife, Martha Dickinson, petitioned for and was granted a divorce in Jackson County Circuit Court in Brownstown in 1971, not knowing that Stephenson had remarried and died in 1966.

== Cultural references ==
- John Heard portrayed Stephenson in the television miniseries Cross of Fire (1989).
- In Daniel Easterman's alternate history novel K is for Killing (1997), Stephenson is featured as the sinister power behind the throne after the isolationist Senator Charles Lindbergh is elected President of the United States. Easterman's novel reflected the documented predatory sexual behavior of Stephenson. He was portrayed as a politically savvy, but unstable ally of Adolf Hitler.

== See also ==
- Indiana Klan
