= Kappa Kappa Kappa =

Kappa Kappa Kappa may refer to:

- Kappa Kappa Kappa, a men's fraternity founded at Buffalo State University later known as Delta Kappa
- Kappa Pi Kappa, a local, social fraternity at Dartmouth College known as Kappa Kappa Kappa for most of its history.
- Tri Kappa, a women's philanthropic organization based in Indiana
