= Judge O'Malley =

Judge O'Malley may refer to:

- Edward Loughlin O'Malley (1842–1932), judge of various British colonies
- Edward R. O'Malley (1863–1935), justice of the New York Supreme Court
- Iseult O'Malley (born 1964), judge of the Supreme Court of Ireland
- Kathleen M. O'Malley (born 1956), judge of the United States Court of Appeals for the Federal Circuit
- Katie O'Malley (born 1962), Baltimore City District Court judge
- Mart O'Malley (1890–1972), justice of the Indiana Supreme Court
