= Heritage Hall (Valparaiso University) =

- U.S. National Register of Historic Places
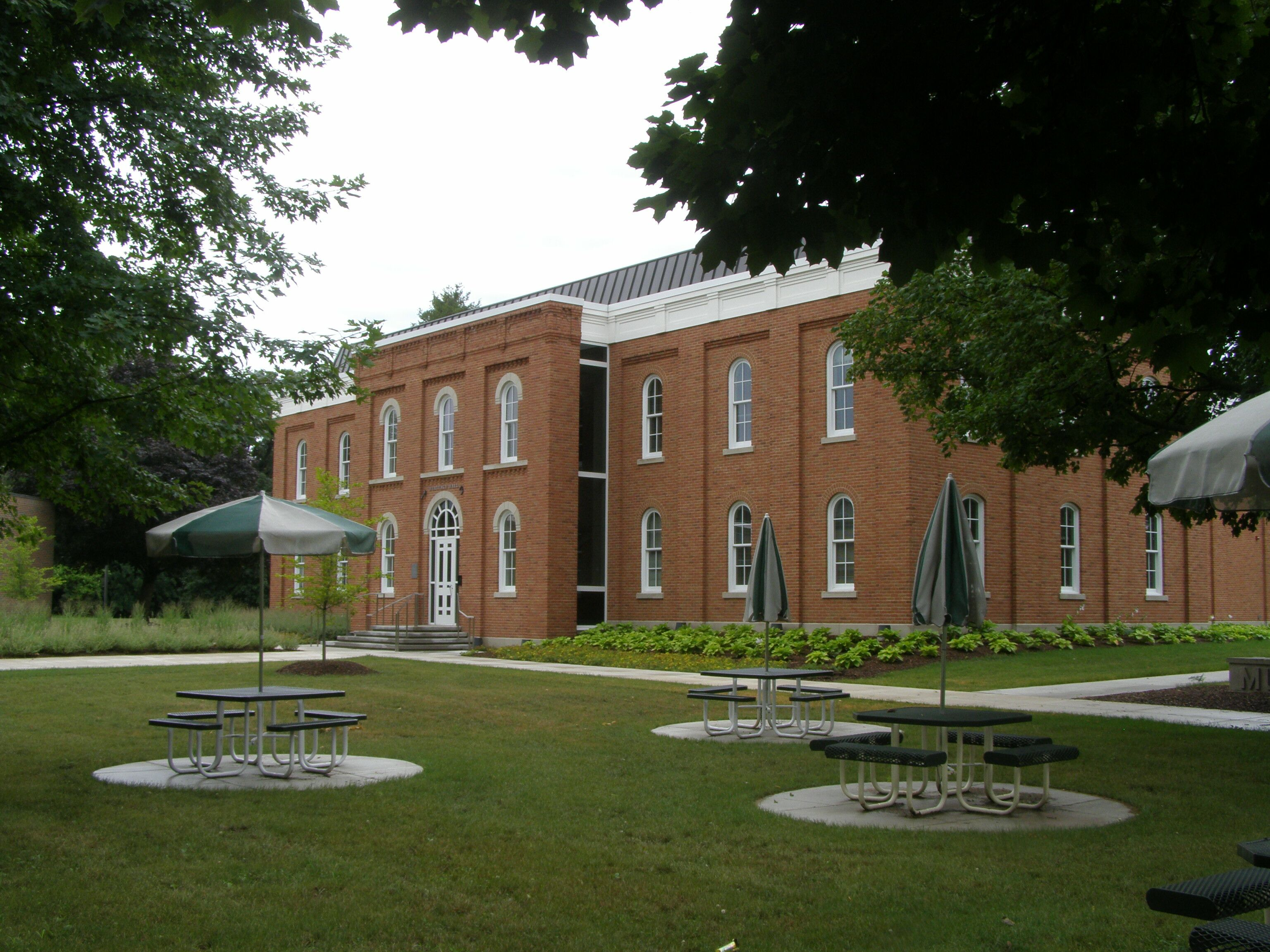
- Heritage Hall as renovated in 2010 – note the replacement of the brick extension with glass wall for the extended front bays.

- Location within Indiana Location within the United States
- Location: 510 Freeman St., Valparaiso, Indiana
- Coordinates: 41°27′43″N 87°3′15″W
- Built: 1875
- Architectural style: Italianate
- NRHP reference No.: 76000016
- Added to NRHP: July 12, 1976

Heritage Hall is the oldest building on the campus of Valparaiso University in the U.S. state of Indiana. Built in 1875 by John Flint, it was used as a residence hall for men. In 1878, a fire destroyed the third floor. The building was later purchased by Richard Abraham Heritage, remodeled into a two-story school of music, and renamed Heritage Hall. At different times throughout its history, Heritage Hall underwent renovations. It was used as a dormitory, a barracks (during World War I), a machinery classroom, and finally a library when Valparaiso University was bought by the Lutheran University Association in 1925. In 1959, the new Moellering Library had been completed and the building was converted to classrooms and offices. Heritage Hall was placed on the National Register of Historic Places in 1976.

Heritage Hall was formerly part of the Valparaiso University School of Law and housed the Valparaiso University Law Clinic, which provided free legal services to qualifying members of the community. In 2006, the then-Dean of Valparaiso University School of Law, Jay Conison, announced that the addition attached to Heritage Hall, formerly the University Mail Center, would be demolished during the summer of 2009. A new addition to Heritage Hall, known as the Lawyering Skills Center, was built in its place. The university's Law Clinic would operate from this new facility, and the building would host other activities focused upon practical skill-building for law students. The construction of this new building was made possible by a $4 million donation.

Heritage Hall now hosts the office of University President Reverend Dr. Brian E. Konkol, following the closure of the Valparaiso University School of Law in 2018.

== History ==
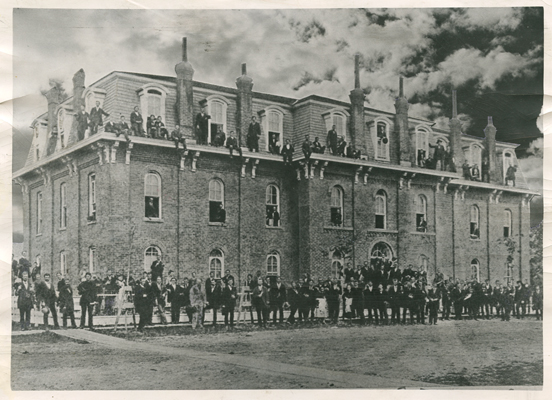
Flint Hall/Heritage Hall, Valparaiso University, circa 1875

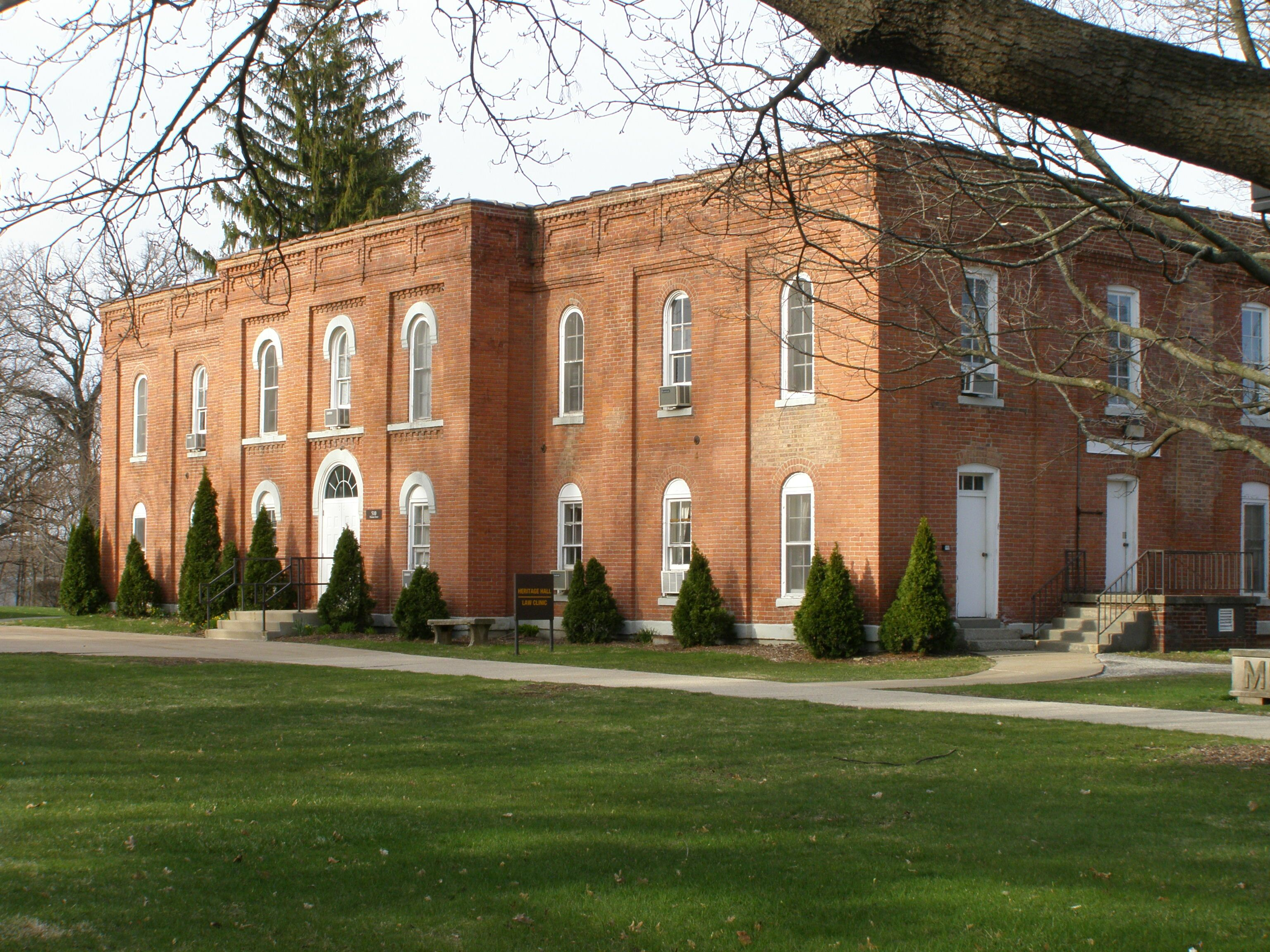
Heritage Hall prior to its complete renovation in 2010

Heritage Hall was a boarding dormitory on College Avenue in 1875. It was a three-story structure built of brick. Heritage Hall was Italianate in design, with a bracketed French Mansard roof and prominent dormers. The third floor was destroyed by fire in 1879. A flat sloping roof was installed, leaving the structure with only two floors. The new roof-line was concealed by extending the outer walls up to create a parapet on three sides. The original chimneys were extended above the parapet line. On the College Avenue side, the parapet was decorated with a brick patterned frieze.

The exterior walls are arranged in a series of two-story bays, each with a tall arched window for each floor, with the substitution of a doorway in five of the bays on the first floor. The three center bays on the front and back project from the main structure. Separating the bays are brick buttresses with chimney traces. Above the second floor windows, the walls of the bays extend out to the face of the parapet, which is flush with the buttresses. The whole structure rests on a low, masonry pedestal which marks the line of the first floor. The pattern of window repetition on the College Avenue side is broken by the arched, double doorway in the center of the building. Originally decorated by a simple masonry arch like the windows that surround it, the central doorway was remodeled with a Georgian styled frame and lintel in 1939. Two wings were added to the back of the building in the twentieth century. The first, a wood-framed barracks, was added for the use of soldiers during the First World War. The barracks continued in use after the war, and in 1925, Heritage Hall was used as the University Library. The wood addition was used as the stacks and were expanded in 1946, with a cement block and brick addition. The library was transferred in 1959 and Heritage was to accommodate offices and classrooms. The deteriorated chimneys were removed. The exterior brickwork was sandblasted and repaired. Heritage Hall, named for Professor Richard Heritage of the music department, was originally known as Flint Hall. John Flint was a local landowner and the builder of the dormitory. In the over one-hundred-year history of the building, it has also served as the shop and classroom for a federal program of veteran rehabilitation after World War I, and from 1925 to 1959 it housed the University Library. At present it accommodates offices for administrative and faculty personnel.

== Significance ==
The structure has bridged several eras in the history of a school that was founded in 1859 as the Valparaiso Male and Female Academy, one of the first coeducational institutions in the United States. It was in 1873 that the school, as the Northern Indiana Normal School, "Mr. Brown's School," began to flourish and achieve a national reputation. It was renamed Valparaiso College in 1900 and rechartered as Valparaiso University in 1907. The building of a dormitory reflected the growing success of President Henry Baker Brown who had brought to American higher education a philosophy that emphasized the offering of practical training to meet the wants of students and the making of such an education, vocational as well as liberal arts, available at a cost which reflected a democratic view. With a faculty that was thorough, and with a student life which emphasized character development, this practical approach to curriculum, offered at the low cost of $8.00 a term, soon attracted an enrollment that was second only to that of Harvard University. The most famous resident of Heritage Hall was George W. Norris, who served as United States Senator from Nebraska 1913 to 1943. Mr. Norris remembered the dormitory as a "large three-story building, which provided furnished rooms and board for men for $1.40 a week."

== Bibliography ==
- George W. Stimpson, The Story of Valparaiso University (Chicago, 1921), p. 30.
- John Strietelmeier, Valparaiso: First Century (Valparaiso, Indiana, 1959), p. 28.
