= Frances Tilton Weaver =

American lawyer

Frances Tilton Weaver (1904–2003) was an American attorney from Illinois.

== History ==
Frances Tilton Weaver was born in 1904 in Hays, Kansas. During her formative years, her family relocated to the midwestern town of Valparaiso, Indiana. While in Valparaiso, Tilton attended the Valparaiso University School of Law; in 1925, she became the first female graduate in the law school's history.

Tilton was admitted to practice law before the Indiana Supreme Court in 1925, the Supreme Court of Illinois in 1927, and the United States District Court of Illinois in 1929. She was reported to be the youngest woman attorney to have licenses to practice law in the state supreme courts, and she was the first woman ever to practice law in Porter County, Indiana. Tilton practiced law in Chicago until 1933, at which time she joined her father in practice in Valparaiso.

She was a member of the Valparaiso Public Library Board, the YMCA Board, the City Planners Commission, the League of Women Voters, and she was listed in the 1958 Marquis edition of "Who's Who of American Women." During the 1930s, Tilton helped organize the Porter Memorial Hospital Guild.

Tilton died in 2003.

== Honors and recognition ==
She was an honorary member of Kappa Kappa Kappa and the Valparaiso Women's Club.

In 1993, Tilton received the Leach Centennial First Woman Award from the Valparaiso University School of Law. Also in 1993, Tilton received an award from the Indiana State Bar Association as a woman honoree in the celebration of 100 years of women in the legal profession. Subsequently, the School of Law established the Frances Tilton Weaver Scholarship in her honor.

In 2004, as part of the 125th anniversary celebration of the Valparaiso University School of Law, students carried the hand-carved walking cane that belonged to Tilton as part of the 'cane march,' a tradition where graduating law students, holding canes and wearing straw hats, march from the Valparaiso University campus to the Porter County courthouse in Valparaiso's town square. She was named as one of the "Top 150 Most Influential Valpo People" by the Valparaiso University Alumni Association.
