= The Moonshine War =

1970 film by Richard Quine

- Theatrical release poster
- Directed by: Richard Quine
- Screenplay by: Elmore Leonard
- Based on: The Moonshine War; 1969 novel by Elmore Leonard
- Produced by: Martin Ransohoff
- Starring: Patrick McGoohan; Richard Widmark; Alan Alda; Will Geer
- Cinematography: Richard H. Kline
- Edited by: Allan Jacobs
- Music by: Fred Karger
- Production company: Filmways Pictures
- Distributed by: Metro-Goldwyn-Mayer
- Release date: July 8, 1970
- Running time: 100 minutes
- Country: United States
- Language: English

The Moonshine War is a 1970 American crime comedy drama film directed by Richard Quine and starring Patrick McGoohan, Richard Widmark, Alan Alda, and Will Geer. It is based on the 1969 novel of the same name by Elmore Leonard.

== Plot ==
John "Son" Martin owns and operates a profitable still, making moonshine whiskey in Prohibition-era Kentucky. One day, he gets a visit from an old Army acquaintance, Frank Long, who is now an Internal Revenue agent.

When Frank is unable to persuade Son to cut him in on the profits, or even reveal where the moonshine is hidden, in exchange for Frank looking the other way, Frank calls in the dangerous Dr. Emmett Taulbee, who uses more violent methods in getting what he wants.

Emmett and his henchmen go too far, killing Sheriff Baylor and even Emmett's girlfriend when she tries to get away. Frank can see that he made a mistake, so he volunteers to help Son fend off the gang. Still outnumbered, Son finally tells Emmett's men where the moonshine is buried in exchange for his life. However, when the crooks start digging, they set off Son's buried dynamite.

== Cast ==
- Patrick McGoohan as Frank Long
- Richard Widmark as Dr. Emmett Taulbee
- Alan Alda as John W. (Son) Martin
- Melodie Johnson as Lizann Simpson
- Will Geer as Sheriff Baylor
- Joe Williams as Aaron
- Suzanne Zenor as Miley Mitchell
- Lee Hazlewood as Dual Metters
- Max Showalter as Mr. Worthman
- Harry Carey, Jr. as Arley Stamper
- Tom Nolan as Lowell
- Richard Peabody as Boyd Caswell
- John Schuck as E.J. Royce
- Bo Hopkins as Bud Blackwell
- Charles Tyner as Mr. McClendon
- Terry Garr as Young Wife
- Claude Johnson as Young Man
- Dick Crockett as Carl
- Patty Sauers as Waitress
- Tom Skeritt as Neighbor (uncredited)

== Production ==
In October 1968 it was announced film rights to the novel had been purchased by Filmways with MGM to release. In March 1969 Richard Quine signed to direct. In June, Patrick McGoohan, who had just made Ice Station Zebra for Filmways and MGM, signed to play the lead. "You have to do something from time to time to pay the rent", said the actor.

Filming started August 1969. It was one of eight features greenlit under the new regime at MGM headed by Louis Polk and Herb Solow, the others being False Witness, The Magic Garden of Stanley Sweetheart (filmed in 1970), The Strawberry Statement (filmed in 1970), She Loves Me (planned for Julie Andrews but not filmed), The Adventures of Augie March, Man's Fate (planned by Fred Zinnemann but not filmed) and The Ballad of Dingus Magee (filmed in 1970).

The novel was published in September 1969. The New York Times called it "a near perfect shotgun opera."

The film went over budget.

== See also ==
- List of American films of 1970
