= The Baby (film) =

1973 American psychological horror film directed by Ted Post

- Theatrical release poster
- Directed by: Ted Post
- Written by: Abe Polsky
- Produced by: Abe Polsky; Milton Polsky; Elliott Feinman
- Starring: Anjanette Comer; Ruth Roman; Marianna Hill; Suzanne Zenor; David Manzy
- Cinematography: Michael D. Margulies
- Edited by: Bob Crawford Sr. Dick Wormell
- Music by: Gerald Fried
- Production company: Quintet Productions
- Distributed by: Scotia International
- Release date: March 1973
- Running time: 85 minutes
- Country: United States
- Language: English
- Budget: $200,000

The Baby is a 1973 American psychological horror film directed by Ted Post and written by Abe Polsky. The film stars Anjanette Comer, Ruth Roman, Marianna Hill, Suzanne Zenor, and David Manzy. It tells the story of a social worker who investigates an eccentric family. The film is considered a cult classic.

== Plot ==
Ann Gentry is a social worker wracked with guilt over a severe car accident with serious repercussions for her husband. She is assigned to a new case: the eccentric and mysterious Wadsworth family. Ann quickly reveals that she has a special interest in the family's youngest member, a seemingly mentally impaired adult man in his 20s, who does not have a name and is called only "Baby." Mrs. Wadsworth has been extremely overprotective of him ever since his father left the family after his birth; she will not let another caregiver interfere. The family's life revolves around Baby's care, and they are dependent upon Baby's disability payments as their main source of income.

Ann wants to work with Baby, who still acts and is treated like an infant by his mother and two sisters, thinking that with the proper treatment, he might begin to behave more appropriately for his age group. She soon discovers that Baby's infant-like state is not caused by any physical or mental conditions, but because of the family's profound neglect and abuse. Baby is never permitted to speak, walk, or do things for himself, and is forced to both wear and use diapers; he is punished by being beaten or restrained, and is even shocked with an electric cattle prod whenever he attempts to break out of the baby role. Baby has been forced to remain in his state of perpetual dependency and infantilism since his actual infancy.

The Wadsworths finally grow tired of Ann's meddling and try to dispose of her during a party, but Ann manages to escape and steal Baby. Ann keeps Baby at her house rather than turning him over to a professional facility. Eventually, goaded by pictures that Ann sent of Baby doing "adult" things, such as standing, the Wadsworths break into the house with murderous intent. They fail to steal Baby back, however, as Ann — with the help of her mother-in-law — kills them all. She stabs Baby's two sisters, then buries Mrs. Wadsworth alive (alongside the corpses of her daughters) beneath the floor of a swimming pool that Ann had been building in her yard.

In the end, Ann's interest in obtaining Baby is revealed to have not been as pure-hearted as it seemed. Now that she has him, she no longer wants to rescue or rehabilitate him; she sought him only so he could be a playmate for her husband, who was left with the mental capacity of an infant after his accident. Thus, under Ann's care, Baby will remain trapped in his state of dependency and infancy, but under the kinder care of Ann and her mother-in-law, with Ann's husband as his "brother."

== Cast ==
- Anjanette Comer as Ann Gentry
- Ruth Roman as Mrs. Wadsworth
- Marianna Hill as Germaine Wadsworth
- Suzanne Zenor as Alba Wadsworth
- Tod Andrews as Doctor
- Michael Pataki as Dennis
- Beatrice Manley Blau as Judith Gentry
- Erin O'Reilly as Babysitter
- Don Mallon as Roger Gentry
- David Mooney (credited as David Manzy) as Baby

== Production ==
Although he had directed a science-fiction film (Beneath the Planet of the Apes) and a horror film (Night Slaves) in the past, The Baby is Post's first incursion into the realm of the utterly bizarre. "A bizarre drama of family dysfunction, The Baby was one of three theatrical features directed by Ted Post and released that year—the other two being Dirty Harry sequel Magnum Force and The Harrad Experiment, based on a once-controversial best seller about what happens when attractive college students are placed in coed dorm rooms."

== Release ==
Scotia International released the film in March 1973 in a limited theatrical release. Image Entertainment released the film in 2000 on VHS and DVD.

The Baby was released on Blu-ray and DVD with a transfer from the original negative by Severin Films in 2011. It was then released again by Arrow Films in 2018.

== Reception ==
On Rotten Tomatoes, the film holds an approval rating of 88%, based on 16 reviews, with a weighted average rating of 7.3/10.

TV Guide awarded the film three out of five stars, calling it "Competently directed", and stated "despite its occasional lapses into genuine bad taste is fairly effective and contains a truly surprising twist ending." Dennis Schwartz from Ozus' World Movie Reviews rated the film a grade B, stating that the film managed to hold attention throughout its duration, and contained a genuinely surprising twist ending, but criticized the film's performances as being "over-the-top", as well as its use of footage of mentally disabled children for exploitation. Brett Gallman from Oh the Horror commended the film's strong performances, twist ending, and genuinely disturbing scenes; while criticizing the film for being "plodding and listless".

== Stage adaptation ==
The film was adapted to the stage in 2013 by Dan Spurgeon and won "Best of Hollywood Fringe" and "Top 10 LA Theatre Production". The stage version was remounted in Toronto in 2015.

== See also ==
- List of American films of 1973
