= Susanne Zenor =

American actress (born 1946)

- Born: Sue Zan Zenor; November 26, 1946 (age 79); Louisville, Kentucky, U.S.
- Other names: Susan Zenor, Suzanne Zenor
- Occupation: Actress
- Years active: 1970–1980
- Spouse: Edward Mallory (m. 1980; died 2007)

Susanne Zenor (born November 26, 1946) is an American retired actress best known for the role of "Margo Anderman Horton" on Days of Our Lives.

== Early life ==
Sue Zan Zenor was born in Louisville, Kentucky on November 26, 1946. She was initiated in the Alpha Kappa chapter of Kappa Kappa Kappa, in Jeffersonville in 1964.

== Career ==
Zenor started her acting career at the Actors Theatre of Louisville. She appeared in the movie The Moonshine War (1970) in which she portrayed Miley Mitchell. Zenor appeared in the Woody Allen movie Play It Again, Sam (1972) in which her name was listed as Suzanne Zenor. She played Alba Wadsworth in The Baby (1973) and was credited as Suzanne Zenor. She also appeared as one of Stockard Channing's victims on TV in Joan Rivers' dark comedy The Girl Most Likely To... (1973), which co-starred Edward Asner.

Zenor made many television guest appearances during the 1970s, in shows such as McMillan & Wife, Love, American Style, M*A*S*H, The Six Million Dollar Man, and Barnaby Jones. In 1976, she appeared in ABC's original pilot for Three's Company playing the naive blonde, Samantha. She starred alongside John Ritter and Valerie Curtin. A second pilot followed, with Susan Lanier in the role of Samantha, now called Chrissy. Eventually, the role went to Suzanne Somers. In 1977, Zenor started playing the role of Margo Anderman Horton on the soap opera Days of Our Lives. Zenor left the role, her last known credit, in 1980. She was married to her Days co-star Edward Mallory until his death in 2007.

== Filmography ==
=== Film ===
Year	Title	Role	Notes
1970	The Moonshine War	Miley Mitchell	
1972	Play It Again, Sam	Discotheque Girl	
1972	Get to Know Your Rabbit	Paula	
1973	The Baby	Alba Wadsworth	
1973	The Way We Were	Dumb Blonde	
1975	Lucky Lady	Brunette	
1977	The Choirboys	Blonde	
1978	Rabbit Test	Mother of Triplets	

=== Television ===
Year	Title	Role	Notes
1972	McMillan & Wife	Virginia Duke	Episode: "An Elementary Case of Murder"
1973	Here We Go Again	Sheryl	Episode: "Sunday, Soggy Sunday"
1973	Catch-22	Nurse Duckett	Television film
1973	Love, American Style	Cristabel	Episode: "Love and the Lie"
1973	The Girl Most Likely To...	Heidi Murphy	Television film
1974	M*A*S*H	Nurse Murphy	Episode: "For Want of a Boot"
1974	The Six Million Dollar Man	Airman Jill Denby	Episode: "Pilot Error"
1975	That's My Mama	Foxy Flo	Episode: "Trial and Error"
1975	The Impostor	April	Television film
1976	Police Story	Marsha	Episode: "The Other Side of the Fence"
1976	Petrocelli	Gigi Laverne	2 episodes
1976	Barnaby Jones	Sue Ellen	Episode: "Blood Vengeance"
1976	The Nancy Walker Show	Barbara Warner	Episode: "The Babysitter"
1976	Three's Company	Samantha	Unaired Pilot #1
1977	C.P.O. Sharkey	Jackie	Episode: "Skolnick in Love"
1977	Husbands and Wives	Joy Bell	Television film
1977	Eight Is Enough	Cocktail Waitress	Episode: "Is There a Doctor in the House?"
1977–1980	Days of Our Lives	Margo Anderman	196 episodes
