= The Girl Most Likely To... =

1973 television film directed by Lee Philips

- DVD cover
- Genre: Black comedy
- Screenplay by: Agnes Gallin; Joan Rivers
- Story by: Joan Rivers
- Directed by: Lee Philips
- Starring: Stockard Channing; Edward Asner; Jim Backus; Joe Flynn; Chuck McCann; Warren Berlinger
- Composer: Bernardo Segall
- Country of origin: United States
- Original language: English

Production
- Producer: Everett Chambers
- Cinematography: Richard C. Glouner
- Editors: George J. Nicholson; Diane Adler
- Running time: 74 minutes
- Production company: ABC Circle Films

Original release
- Network: ABC
- Release: November 6, 1973

The Girl Most Likely To... is a 1973 American black comedy, psychological horror, television film directed by Lee Philips and written by Joan Rivers and Agnes Gallin. A college student who is avoided and bullied for her unattractive appearance gets into an car accident. After reconstructive plastic surgery gives her a new beautiful face and identity, she vows to avenge those who tormented her based on her old appearance. It stars Stockard Channing and Ed Asner. The film premiered on November 6, 1973, as part of the ABC Movie of the Week. The story has plot elements similar to the 1950 film The Second Face.

== Plot ==
Miriam Knight is an intelligent, though unattractive young woman who is treated disrespectfully by those around her due to her homely appearance. She has changed colleges five times in three years. At the same time, Miriam's family has arranged for her to marry a chauvinistic plumber named Herman, but he is not attracted to her. Miriam enrolls in a new college in Los Angeles. She is reluctantly placed in a room with a rude yet attractive and popular blonde girl, named Heidi, who is into gymnastics. Heidi, as a prank, sets Miriam up on a date with one of the guys at the school, a pool player named Fred. Once Miriam arrives at the date, Fred is disgusted by Miriam, and he runs away from her, causing Miriam to feel upset about the rejection.

Miriam is once again rejected when her teacher forces her to tutor Moose, the school's star football player. However, Moose is also turned off by Miriam's appearance and avoids her. One night during a heavy rainstorm, Miriam is locked out of her room by Heidi and is soaked. Miriam decides to walk to the parking lot to sleep in her car. Due to looking suspicious and walking around wet, she is stopped by a burly and absent minded police officer patrolling the campus named Ralph Varone. Miriam and Varone have a light hearted exchange and he doesn't give her a citation and leaves her alone. One day, Miriam gets food poisoning from the school's cafeteria. At the schools infirmary, as a prank, a young medical student named Ted pretends to be attracted to Miriam, and once Miriam finds out about this practical joke, she is faced with yet another humiliating experience.

As Miriam continues her school year, she is either ignored or badgered by almost everyone. However, unbeknownst to Miriam, the drama teacher is impressed by her attitude and gives her the lead in a fictional Southern Romance play at the school, but Heidi, who also auditioned for the lead, becomes jealous and is determined to sabotage and embarrass Miriam during the play. Knowing that Miriam is allergic to roses, Heidi places some in a box during Miriam's performance, causing Miriam to sneeze herself into humiliation. Embarrassed at what happened at the play, Miriam, tearfully speeds away from the college campus, and attempts to kill herself by intentionally driving recklessly. Miriam crashes her car, and gets into an accident that nearly kills her. However, she survives the ordeal.

As Miriam recovers from the accident at the hospital, Herman reveals he is now married, and tells Miriam he is no longer going to pretend to be interested in her. Miriam undergoes plastic surgery to restore her old face which was destroyed in the accident. Once the bandages are removed, they reveal a beautiful woman. Miriam is shocked at her new attractive appearance, but decides to use this opportunity to her advantage. From the moment she steps outside the hospital, she makes it her mission to exact vengeance on all those who did her wrong by killing them, one by one, after disclosing her "old" identity. Miriam's first victim is Ted. Impersonating an attractive nurse, Miriam starts to seduce Ted, and injects him with a strong sedative. Miriam then manages to trick a surgeon to give Ted an unneeded appendectomy. Miriam also tampers with the medication during Ted's surgery, which ultimately kills him.

Now that Miriam has killed her first victim, she proceeds to go down the list to anyone who wronged her when she was ugly. With her new face, Miriam impersonates a new identity as a blonde daredevil, whom Moose is smitten with. Miriam takes Moose on a skydiving date, but intentionally gives him a broken parachute, resulting in Moose dying. Meanwhile, Varone starts to investigate the death of Moose, knowing it's foul play due to the fact that Moose was the star football player at the school. Miriam decides to target Heidi next, impersonating an English gymnastics scout who wants to sign her. While Heidi is auditioning and impressing the "scout", Miriam pushes her out a high window, killing her. Varone is now more suspicious in his investigation, now that two popular students are dead under suspicious circumstances.

Miriam's next victim is Herman. Miriam proceeds to Herman's shop, and with her new face, Herman is now suddenly interested in her and agrees to go on a date with her. Miriam continues to woo and charm Herman in her new identity. Herman, right before intending to have sex with Miriam, is tricked into fixing a pipe Miriam intentionally broke in the bathroom. Herman is unable to fix the leak due to not having the proper tools. Miriam locks Herman in the bathroom and runs out of the house, leaving Herman to drown to death. Miriam makes the mistake of attending Herman's funeral. Varone incidentally is also present at Herman's funeral. Miriam starts to have an allergic reaction to the roses that are at the funeral, which further draws suspicion as Varone at this point has already deduced that Miriam is the suspect, and is aware of her rose allergy.

With Varone now certain that the person responsible for all the killings is Miriam, he intends to finally confront her. Miriam's final victim is Fred, to whom Miriam pretends to be a mysterious streetwalker. Miriam flirts with Fred, and she intends to kill both Fred and herself with a booby trapped pool ball that's actually a bomb, which would explode and burn the entire building down. Varone arrives at the pool hall at the same time and arrests Miriam. However, Miriam leaves the pool ball which Fred falls victim to. Varone is remarkably attracted to how sadistic Miriam is, and can't explain his attraction to her. Miriam also is attracted to Varone, and claims he's the man she's been looking for her entire life. Varone is at an impasse, and says unfortunately he has to do his job and duty and arrest Miriam, but promises to marry her.

Miriam and Varone are later married, and Miriam is sentenced to jail due to the murders of her classmates. Varone promises that he will still be with Miriam even until she is paroled. Varone accidentally forgets he has a rose lapel on his suit jacket, which causes Miriam to have an allergic reaction. Miriam's cellmates and Varone's officers celebrate and cheer for them, as Miriam continues to sneeze.

== Cast ==
- Stockard Channing as Miriam Knight
- Ed Asner as Detective Ralph Varone
- Jim Backus as Professor David Tilson
- Joe Flynn as Dr. Green
- Chuck McCann as Coach
- Cyril Delevanti as Minister
- Carl Ballantine as Dr. Hankim
- Ruth McDevitt as Housemistress
- Susanne Zenor as Heidi Murphy
- Fred Grandy as Ted Gates
- Larry Wilcox as "Moose" Meyers
- Warren Berlinger as Herman Anderson
- Dan Spelling as Fred Ames
- Florence Lake as Computer Clerk
- Victor Izay as Dr. Wolfe
- Bill Zuckert as Priest At Funeral
- Reb Brown as Football Player
- Warren Burton as Actor
- Angela Clarke as Actress
- Dennis Dugan as Charlie Elliott
- Annette O'Toole as Jenny
