= Evan B. Goss =

American judge

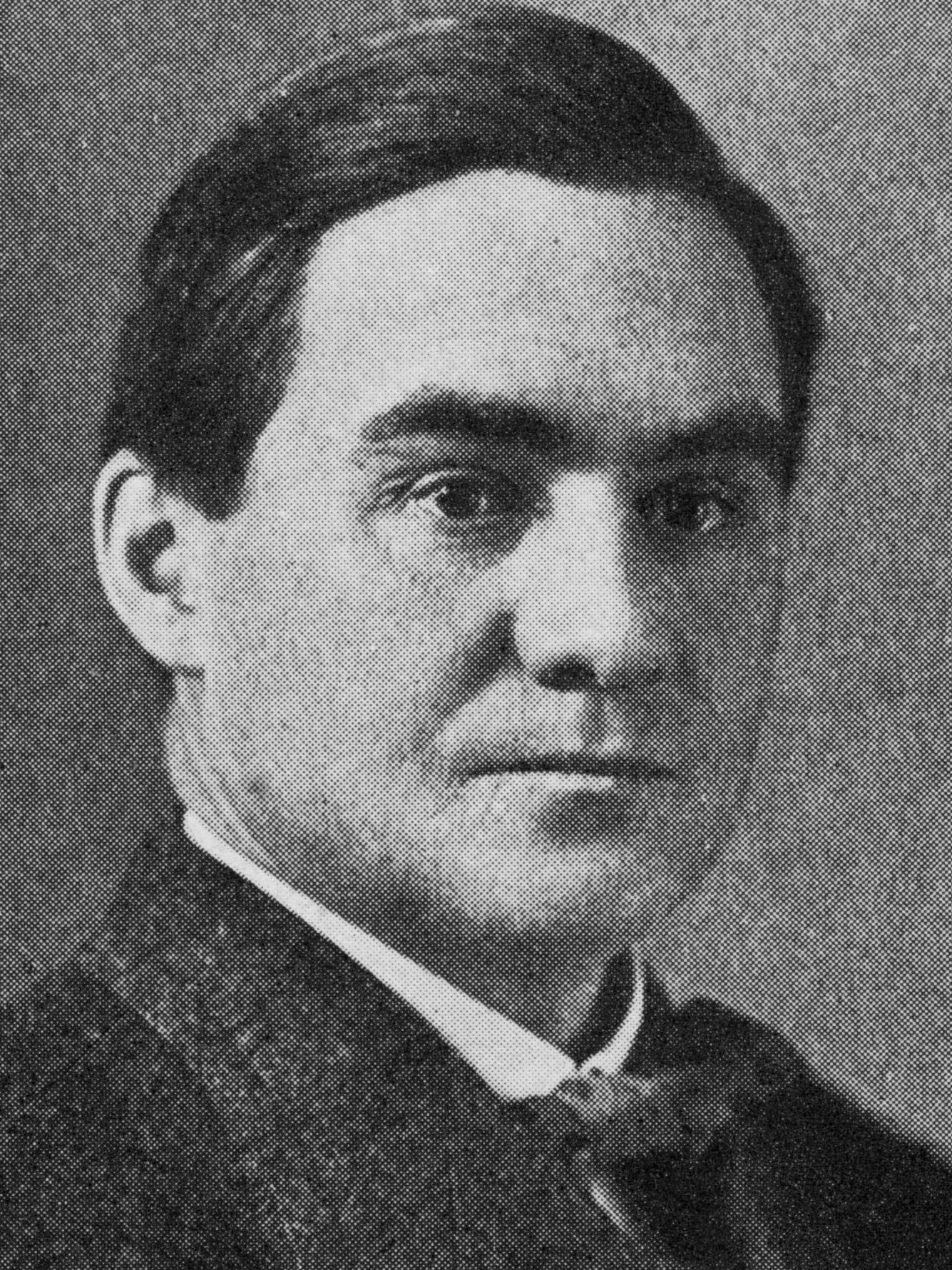

Justice of the North Dakota Supreme Court
- In office 1911–1916
- Preceded by: Sidney E. Ellsworth
- Succeeded by: Richard Grace

Personal details
- Born: December 8, 1872 Michigan, US
- Died: March 23, 1930 (aged 57) California, US
- Education: University of Michigan

Evan Benson Goss (December 8, 1872 – March 23, 1930) was an American judge who served as a justice of the Supreme Court of North Dakota from 1911 to 1916.

== Biography ==
Evan B. Goss was born on December 8, 1872, in Michigan. Many years later he attended the University of Michigan. In 1894, he received his law degree and a master's degree the next year. He practiced law briefly in Grand Rapids before moving to Bottineau, North Dakota. He opened a law office in Bottineau and practiced there for several years. During this time, he served two terms as the State's Attorney of Bottineau County. In 1904, he was elected Judge of the Eighth Judicial District. In the 1910 election, he defeated Justice Sidney E. Ellsworth for a spot on the North Dakota Supreme Court. In 1916, he was defeated in his attempt for reelection. He returned to Minot to practice law and continued to do so until his death on March 23, 1930.

== See also ==
- North Dakota Supreme Court
- List of justices of the North Dakota Supreme Court
