= Dan Flanagan =

American judge (1899–1960)

Justice of the Indiana Supreme Court
- In office April 1, 1953 – December 31, 1954
- Appointed by: George N. Craig
- Preceded by: Paul G. Jasper
- Succeeded by: Harold Achor

Daniel Collins Flanagan (April 23, 1899 – February 28, 1960) was an American lawyer, politician, and judge who served as a justice of the Indiana Supreme Court from April 1, 1953, to December 31, 1954.

== Biography ==
=== Early life, education, and career ===
Flanagan was born in Lafayette, Indiana. His father, Dan Patrick Flanagan (of Irish descent), practiced law in Lafayette.

Flanagan attended high school at Frankfort High School in Frankfort, Indiana. After graduating from high school, he enlisted in the United States Army and served as a sergeant in the Field Artillery Branch during the First World War.

After the war, Flanagan began attending Benjamin Harrison Law School (now known as Indiana University Robert H. McKinney School of Law) in Indianapolis, graduating in 1921 with an LL.B and being admitted to the bar.

After graduation, Flanagan returned to Frankfort and practiced law there until 1924, serving as Deputy Prosecutor for Clinton County from 1921 to 1922. Flanagan then moved to practice law in Fort Wayne. He began at the firm of Heaton & Heaton. In 1931, he became a member of the firm of Leonard, Rose, Flanagan & McCreevy. In 1934, he and Jim Murphy established the firm of Flanagan & Murphy. In 1937, he and Charles Bond established the firm of Flanagan & Bond.

Flanagan served as Deputy Prosecutor for Allen County from 1929 to 1930. In 1936, he became Chairman of the Allen County Republican Party Central Committee, overseeing several successful local campaigns. In 1940, he served as Allen County attorney. Flanagan was a member of the Allen County Bar Association, the Indiana State Bar Association, and the American Bar Association.

Flanagan taught at Valparaiso University School of Law (part of the school's extension lecture staff) and the Notre Dame Law School (as part of the school's permanent lecture staff). He also authored numerous influential textbooks on law.

=== Judicial service and later life ===
Flanagan was appointed a judge of the Indiana Court of Appeals in 1941 by Governor M. Clifford Townsend. He won re-election twice and served in the position until 1949. After leaving the appellate court, he returned to private practice in Fort Wayne.

In 1953, Flanagan was appointed to the Indiana Supreme Court by Governor George N. Craig following the resignation of Justice Paul G. Jasper. He left the court in 1954, succeeded by Justice Harold Achor.

After leaving the court, Flanagan again returned to private practice in Fort Wayne. In 1959, he formed a new firm with Robert S. McCain.

=== Personal life and death ===
Flanagan was a Catholic and attended St. Patrick's Church in Fort Wayne. He was very involved with the church's activities; he was an altar server, a member of the Society of the Holy Name, and served as Scoutmaster for his local Catholic Youth Organization Boy Scouts Troop, Troop No. 19. Flanagan was also a member of the Knights of Columbus (fourth degree). He also served as President of the Ancient Order of Hibernians.

In 1925, Flanagan married Mabelle Cass, who he met shortly after moving to Fort Wayne. They had a son, Daniel Jr.

Flanagan died in Fort Wayne in 1960, at the age of 60, following an illness of several months. He was interred in the Catholic Cemetery of Fort Wayne.

Political offices
Preceded by Paul G. Jasper	Justice of the Indiana Supreme Court; 1953–1954	Succeeded by Harold Achor
