= Edward Mallory =

American actor (1930-2007)

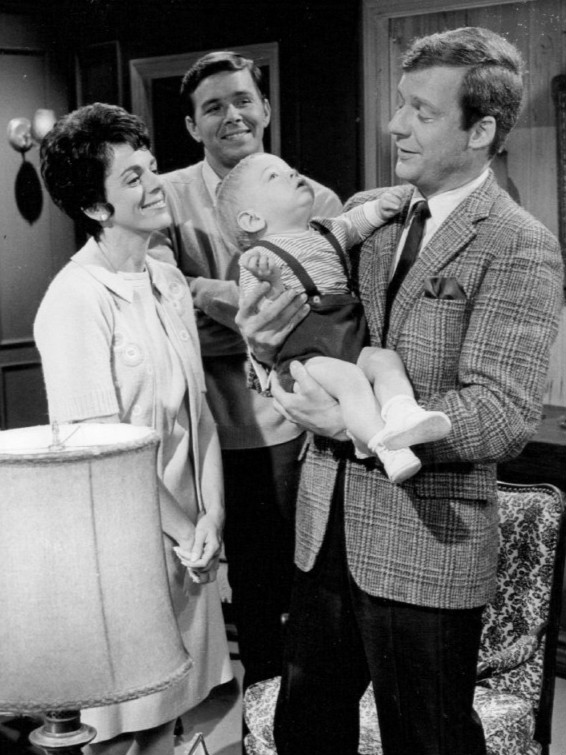
- Mallory (right) on the set of Days of Our Lives, 1968
- Born: June 14, 1930; Cumberland, Maryland, U.S.
- Died: April 4, 2007 (aged 76); Salisbury, Pennsylvania, U.S.
- Education: Carnegie Mellon University
- Years active: 1960–2007
- Spouses: Joyce Bulifant (m. 1969; div. 1974) Susanne Zenor (m. 1980)
- Children: John Asher; Shay Mallory

Edward Mallory (born Edward Ralph Martz; June 14, 1930 – April 4, 2007) was an American actor, best known for his role as Dr. Bill Horton on the soap opera Days of Our Lives, which he played from 1966 to 1980.

== Biography ==
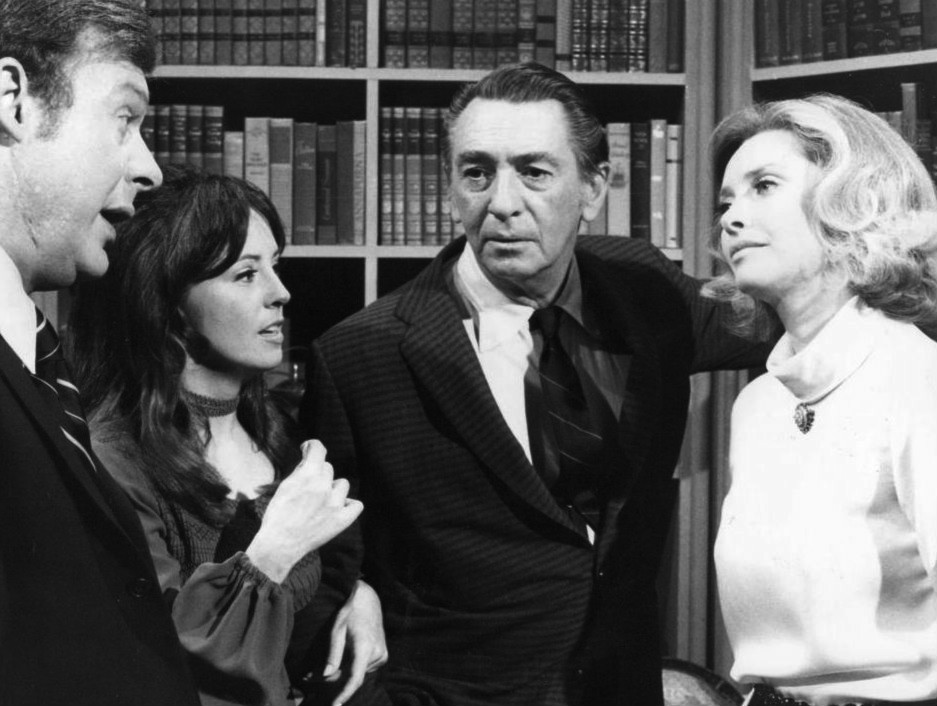
Cast 1971 photo of Days of Our Lives (L-R): Edward Mallory, Denise Alexander, Macdonald Carey and Susan Flannery

Mallory once was married to actress Joyce Bulifant, with whom he had one child, John Mallory Asher, and was married to Susanne Zenor at the time of his death; Zenor played Margo Horton on Days of Our Lives. Mallory, a 1958 graduate of the Drama Department of Carnegie Mellon University, was an artist in residence at Frostburg State University.

Mallory also taught a video and speech performance class.

He can be seen as the Thief in The Alfred Hitchcock Hour episode "Ten Minutes from Now". (Note: The closing titles of the episode name Edward Mallory as “The Thief,” but there is no other speaking “thief” in the scene but Donnelly Rhodes and David Carradine.)

== Filmography ==
Year	Title	Role	Notes
1962	Walk on the Wild Side	Gentleman with Hallie	Uncredited
1962	Experiment in Terror	Dick - Kelly's Boyfriend	Uncredited
1962	The Underwater City	Lt. Wally Steele	
1962	Birdman of Alcatraz	John Clary	Uncredited
1962	The Interns	Dr. Anderfell	Uncredited
1962	Diamond Head	Robert Parsons	
