= Donald Hunter (judge) =

American judge (1911–1991)

Donald Herbert Hunter (October 21, 1911 – October 27, 1991) was a justice of the Indiana Supreme Court from January 2, 1967, to September 6, 1985, including service as chief justice for three terms during that period.

== Early life, education, and military and political service ==
Born in Anderson, Indiana, Hunter received an LL.B. from the short-lived Lincoln College of Law in Indianapolis, in 1937. He was an initiated member of Tau Kappa Epsilon fraternity from Butler University. He represented Madison County, Indiana, in the Indiana House of Representatives from 1943 to 1944, and served in an infantry unit in the United States Army in the European theatre of World War II, from 1943 to 1946, receiving a Purple Heart and a Bronze Star Medal. Still a member of the state legislature, in 1944 he was briefly "furloughed from the Army to attend a special legislative session".

== Judicial service ==
Hunter was a state circuit judge from 1948 to 1962, and a judge of the Indiana Court of Appeals from 1963 to 1966.

He served on the state supreme court from 1967 until he reached the mandatory retirement age in 1985. He was the first judge to serve on all three levels of the Indiana judiciary. Hunter "distinguished himself as a progressive civil law judge", who "championed the rights of Indiana's working men and women", while also being viewes as "a conservative in criminal cases". From 1967 to 1971, he also served on the Indiana Constitutional Revision Commission.

== Personal life and death ==
On October 14, 1941, Hunter married Violet Oemler of Covington, Kentucky, with whom he had a daughter and a son. Hunter died in a retirement home in LaGrange, Indiana, at the age of 80.

Political offices
Preceded by Harold Achor	Justice of the Indiana Supreme Court; 1967–1985	Succeeded by Randall T. Shepard
