= Sidney E. Ellsworth =

American judge (1862–1935)

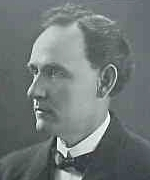

Justice of the North Dakota Supreme Court
- In office 1909–1910
- Appointed by: John Burke
- Preceded by: Seat established
- Succeeded by: Evan B. Goss

Personal details
- Born: September 29, 1862 Pittsburgh, Pennsylvania
- Died: October 31, 1945 (aged 83)
- Education: Valparaiso University School of Law

Sidney E. Ellsworth (September 29, 1862 – October 31, 1935) was a justice of the North Dakota Supreme Court from 1909 to 1910.

== Biography ==
Sidney E. Ellsworth was born on September 29, 1862, near Pittsburgh, Pennsylvania. His family moved to Kansas in 1871 and later to Illinois in 1875.

He graduated from Valparaiso University School of Law in 1891. He moved to North Dakota in 1893 and lived in Carrington, North Dakota until December 1894. He then moved to Jamestown, North Dakota continued his legal practice there for the next fifty years.

In January 1909, Ellsworth was appointed to the North Dakota Supreme Court by Governor John Burke at the age of 46. Justice Ellsworth was defeated in the 1910 election. He served on the Supreme Court for a total of one year and eleven and a half months.

From 1936 to 1938, Ellsworth served as an attorney for the Highway Department. He died on October 31, 1945, at the age 83.
