= Valparaiso University School of Law =

Defunct law school in Valparaiso, Indiana

Valparaiso University Law School
- Parent school: Valparaiso University
- Established: 1879
- School type: Private
- Location: Valparaiso, Indiana, US; 41.4614°N 87.0531°W
- USNWR ranking: (defunct)
- Bar pass rate: 61-63%
- Website: www.valpo.edu/law/

The Valparaiso University Law School was the law school of Valparaiso University, a private university in Valparaiso, Indiana. Founded in 1879, the school was accredited by the American Bar Association in 1929 and admitted to the Association of American Law Schools in 1930. In October 2016, the ABA censured the school for admitting applicants who did not appear capable of satisfactorily completing the school's program of legal education and being admitted to the bar. One year later, the school suspended admissions and shut down after the last class graduated in 2020.

== Campus ==
The city of Valparaiso, Indiana, is located 50 miles (80 km) southeast of Chicago, and 10 miles (16 km) south of Lake Michigan and the Indiana Dunes National Lakeshore.

The Valparaiso law school was primarily located in Wesemann Hall, in an area known as "Old Campus". Valparaiso University's 320-acre (1.3 km^{2}) campus is part of the downtown Valparaiso historic district. The Lawyering Skills Center and Law Clinic were next door, in the recently renovated Heritage Hall.

== History ==
Originally named the Northern Indiana Law School, Valparaiso Law School began operations with nine students (including two women) on November 11, 1879. Tuition was set at $10 per term. It was one of the first in the nation to admit both men and women. Colonel Mark L. DeMotte became the school's first dean and was one of the original three faculty members. During his appointment, he developed the core curriculum that remained in use at Valparaiso until its closure.

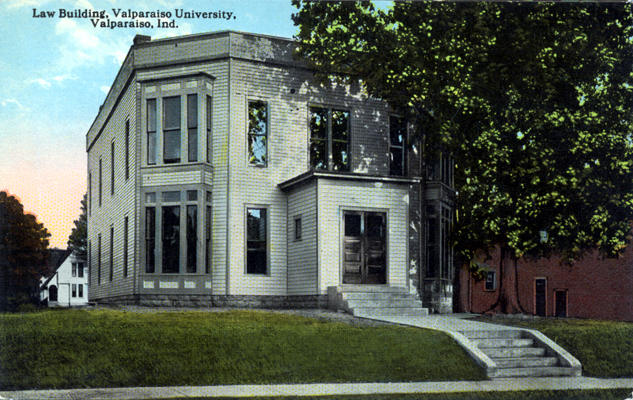
Valparaiso University School of Law, circa 1910 (Photograph courtesy of the S. Shook Collection)

Despite difficult economic times and amidst an economic depression, the Northern Indiana Law School remained and experienced growth during its second decade. At the turn of the century, 21 years after its founding, the school had an enrollment of 170 students and was reportedly the largest law school in Indiana.

In 1905, the law school became part of Valparaiso University and was thus officially renamed the Valparaiso University School of Law/Valparaiso University Law School. Following consultation and inspection with the American Bar Association and the Association of American Law Schools, the law school expanded its curriculum, received its ABA accreditation in 1929, and was admitted into AALS in 1930. It was the thirty-eighth oldest ABA-accredited law school in the United States. A 1925 graduate, Frances Tilton Weaver, became the youngest woman to be admitted to practice before both the Indiana Supreme Court and the Illinois Supreme Court. She practiced law in Chicago until moving with her husband back to Valparaiso to practice law with her father, Ira Tilton, who in nearly six decades in Valparaiso had served as a schoolteacher, city attorney, and judge, as well as head of the local Democratic Party.

In 2013, long-term law school dean Jay Conison resigned to accept a position at the relatively new Charlotte School of Law. His replacement was the former associate dean of DePaul Law School, Andrea Lyon, who in 1979 had been the first woman lead counsel in a death penalty case. While the law school's practical skills training received a high ranking from the National Jurist Magazine, and the Prelaw Magazine cited its innovation, the school faced financial issues and censure from the ABA in October 2016.

Valparaiso School of Law was censured by the ABA in October 2016 for violating ABA Standards 501(a) and 501(b). Those standards require that "a law school shall maintain sound admission policy and practices" and "shall not admit an applicant who does not appear capable of satisfactorily completing its program of legal education and being admitted to the bar". Since 2010, Valparaiso met declining applications with reduced admissions standards to maintain the size of the school's student body. In 2010, the entering class had a median LSAT score of 150 and a median GPA of 3.31. By 2015, Valparaiso's entering class had a median LSAT score of 145 and a median GPA of 2.93. Valparaiso's bar passage rates plummeted as a result. In 2013, 77% of graduates taking the Indiana bar exam and 71% of graduates taking the Illinois bar exam passed on the first attempt. But in 2014, only 61% of graduates taking the Indiana bar exam and only 63% of graduates taking the Illinois bar exam passed on the first attempt. In November 2017, the ABA lifted the sanction of public censure on Valparaiso School of Law, stating that the school had demonstrated compliance with ABA Standards 501(a) and 501(b).

In March 2017, the university hired Ogilvy Public Relations to handle the law school's termination or downsizing. In November, the university announced that no students would be admitted for the year beginning in 2018. On March 21, 2018, the law school announced Dean Lyon's resignation effective June 1 and that she would continue to teach as a professor. Three months later, in June, the Valparaiso University submitted to Middle Tennessee State University (MTSU) a non-binding letter of intent to transfer the Valparaiso University School of Law to MTSU. MTSU's president clarified with media sources that the law school was not being purchased or merged into MTSU but was "much like a gift". Although MTSU's trustees were in favor of the move, it was rejected by the Tennessee Higher Education Commission in October and the school announced its pending closure as it ensured that currently enrolled students would have an opportunity to complete their education.

== Admissions and academics ==
The law school offered a traditional three-year full-time program, an accelerated two-and-a-half year program, and a five-year, part-time program toward the Juris Doctor degree, a Master of Laws degree program, and the following dual degree programs: JD/MBA, JD/MALS, JD/MA (Psychology), JD/Clinical Mental Health Counseling, JD/MA in Chinese Studies, JD/MA in Liberal Studies, JD/MS International Commerce & Policy, and JD/MS Sports Administration, and the S.J.D, the School's advanced research degree that was open to candidates who had completed an LL.M.

The School of Law offered eight live legal clinics: criminal clinic, civil clinic, juvenile clinic, domestic violence clinic, mediation clinic, sports law clinic, tax clinic, and wrongful conviction clinic. The school also offered more than 85 discrete externship opportunities. In 2005, the School of Law started the nation's first sports law clinic, giving free advice to amateur status athletes during the Olympics.

== Post-graduation employment ==
According to Valparaiso's official 2015 ABA-required disclosures, 42% of the class of 2015 obtained full-time, long-term, bar-passage-required employment. 23% of graduates were unemployed ten months after graduation. Three graduates were working in non-professional positions after graduation. Valparaiso's Law School Transparency under-employment score was 37.4%, indicating the percentage of the class of 2015 unemployed, pursuing an additional degree, or working in a non-professional, short-term, or part-time job nine months after graduation.

Struggling graduates of Valparaiso Law School were featured in a New York Times article in June 2016. One Valparaiso Law School graduate worked in the clothing department of a retail store, and another graduate discussed his grim job prospects.

== Costs ==
The total cost of attendance (indicating the cost of tuition, fees, and living expenses) at Valparaiso for the 2014–2015 academic year was $53,862. The Law School Transparency estimated debt-financed cost of attendance for three years was $196,217. Valparaiso engaged in the practice of offering new students conditional scholarships. These scholarships were contingent on the student maintaining a specific grade point average rather than remaining in good academic standing. Valparaiso imposed a grading curve with a median GPA of 2.7 on first-year students. As a result of the curve, 18 Valparaiso students had their scholarships withdrawn or reduced during the 2014–2015 academic year.

== Student life ==
Valparaiso Law students could participate in more than 40 student organizations. According to Valparaiso's 2015 Standard 509 Report, 17 students transferred to higher ranking schools the previous academic year.

== Notable faculty ==
- Dan Flanagan, Justice of the Indiana Supreme Court.
- Faisal Kutty lawyer, academic, and writer focusing on law and religion, Islamic law, Islamic culture, practice and rights.

== Notable alumni ==
- Holly A. Brady, class of 1994, the Chief United States district judge of the United States District Court for the Northern District of Indiana.
- Steve Buyer, class of 1984, former U.S. Congressman from Indiana's 4th district, works for R.J. Reynolds promoting the use of smokeless tobacco.
- Daniel Didech, class of 2014, Illinois State Representative.
- Floyd Draper, class of 1915, Justice of the Indiana Supreme Court.
- David W. Dugan, class of 1985, United States Federal District Court Judge, Southern District of Illinois
- Sidney E. Ellsworth, class of 1891, North Dakota Supreme Court from 1909 to 1910.
- Richard G. Hatcher, class of 1959, in 1968 became the first African-American mayor of Gary, Indiana and one of the first black mayors elected in a major Northern industrial city.
- Steve McClure, Illinois State Senator who represents the 54th District.
- Mart O'Malley, class of 1912, Indiana Supreme Court Justice.
- Craig S. Morford, class of 1984, former acting United States Deputy Attorney General and former federal prosecutor.
- Raymond Nimmer, class of 1968, former dean, Childs Professor of Law and co-director of the Houston Intellectual Property and Information Law Institute at the University of Houston Law Center.
- George William Norris, class of 1883, former U.S. Senator from Nebraska
- Eugene E. Parker, class of 1982, African-American former sports agent for Deion Sanders, Emmitt Smith and other NFL players.
- Xavier Prather, class of 2018, first African-American winner of Big Brother
- Eugene Rice, class of 1917, former United States federal judge (Eastern District of Oklahoma)
- Robert D. Rucker, class of 1976, former justice on the Indiana Supreme Court.
- Theodore L. Sendak, class of 1958, 36th Indiana Attorney General.
- Frances Tilton Weaver, a 1925 graduate, the first woman attorney in Porter County, Indiana, and the youngest woman to be admitted to practice before the Indiana Supreme Court and the Illinois Supreme Court.
- Heather A. Welch, class of 1994, Judge, Superior Court of Marion County, Indiana.

== See also ==
- List of defunct law schools in the United States
