= Harold Achor =

American judge (1907–1967)

Justice of the Indiana Supreme Court
- In office January 3, 1955 – December 12, 1966
- Preceded by: Dan Flanagan
- Succeeded by: Donald Hunter

Harold Edward Achor (November 16, 1907 – February 5, 1967) was an American lawyer, politician, and judge who served as a justice of the Indiana Supreme Court from January 3, 1955, to December 12, 1966.

== Biography ==
=== Early life, education, and career ===
Achor was born in Coffeyville, Kansas. When Achor was an infant, his family moved to Kosciusko County, Indiana. Achor attended public school in Atwood.

Achor attended the University of Indianapolis (then known as Indiana Central College), graduating in 1928. He received his legal education at Indiana University Maurer School of Law (in Bloomington), graduating in 1931, and moved to Anderson that year to begin practicing law, founding the firm of Achor & Peck with his former classmate at IU, William L. Peck.

From 1932 to 1937, Achor taught public speaking and political science at Anderson University (then known as Anderson College). He was also a member of the Anderson College Board of Trustees and the Board of Governors of the Associated Colleges of Indiana. He was also appointed to the Committee of One Hundred of the International Council of Religious Education and helped to organize a branch of Alcoholics Anonymous in Muncie. He additionally served in many other local civic and religious organizations in Anderson.

Achor was involved with the Anderson Church of God and helped to organize the Anderson Area Inter-Faith Fellowship, "an annual gathering of pacifists concerned about eliminating racial prejudice and discrimination" which included Protestants, Catholics, and Jews.

=== Judicial service ===
In 1942, Achor, a Republican, was elected judge of the Madison County Superior Court. During this time, he also worked as a marriage counselor. In 1950, he was elected judge of the Indiana Appellate Court, serving in the position for a single four-year term.

In 1955, Achor became a justice of the Indiana Supreme Court, succeeding Justice Dan Flanagan. He resigned from the bench in 1966 due to his failing health. He was succeeded to the court by Justice Donald Hunter.

=== Personal life and death ===
In 1935, Achor married Helen Shoemaker in Anderson. Shoemaker was originally from Tomball, Texas. Achor died in 1967, in Anderson.

Political offices
Preceded by Dan Flanagan	Justice of the Indiana Supreme Court; 1955–1966	Succeeded by Donald Hunter
