= Paul G. Jasper =

American judge (1908–2001)

Justice of the Indiana Supreme Court
- In office January 3, 1949 – March 31, 1953
- Preceded by: Mart O'Malley
- Succeeded by: Dan Flanagan

Personal details
- Born: Paul George Jasper; December 15, 1908 Fort Wayne, Indiana, U.S.
- Died: October 23, 2001 (aged 92) Indiana, U.S.
- Party: Democratic
- Spouse: Mary Esther Tucker
- Education: Indiana University Maurer School of Law (LLB)
- Profession: Politician, lawyer, judge

Paul George Jasper (December 15, 1908 – October 23, 2001) was an American lawyer, politician, and judge who served as a justice of the Indiana Supreme Court from January 3, 1949, to March 31, 1953.

== Biography ==
=== Early life and education ===
Jasper was born in Fort Wayne, Indiana.

Jasper received his LL.B from the Indiana University Maurer School of Law in Bloomington in 1932. In addition to studying law, he lettered in both football and basketball and served as president of both his senior class and the Board of Aeons, a student advisory organization to the university president.

Jasper returned to Fort Wayne after graduating and practiced law there until 1949. Jasper's legal career was interrupted following U.S. entry into the Second World War. Jasper enlisted and fought in the Pacific Theater in the Central Pacific as part of the 98th Infantry Division, attaining the rank of major before the war's end.

=== Political and judicial career ===
In 1948, Jasper, a Democrat, was elected to the Indiana Supreme Court to succeed Justice Mart O'Malley. He authored seventy-eight opinions during his four years on the bench. Jasper left the court in 1953, succeeded by Justice Dan Flanagan. Jasper resigned from the court to become assistant general counsel for Public Service Indiana, an energy company.

Jasper was appointed six times by President Harry Truman to the President's Emergency Board to assist in resolving railroad labor disputes.

Jasper served for many years on the Indiana State Police Board for sixteen years.

In 1974, Jasper joined the legal counsel of the Indiana Electric Association.

=== Personal life and death ===
In 1960, Jasper became president of the Indiana University Alumni Association. He was awarded the Distinguished Alumni Service Award by the Association in 1970. He was involved in three other IU alumni organizations—the I-Men's Club, the Woodburn Guild, and the Varsity Club. He was also a class agent at the Maurer School of Law, a judge of the IU moot court, and a fellow of the Law School's Academy of Law Alumni.

Jasper was a member of the Allen County Bar Association, the Marion County Bar Association, the Indiana State Bar Association, and the American Bar Association.

Jasper married Mary Esther Tucker of Salem.

Jasper died in 2001.

Political offices
Preceded by Mart O'Malley	Justice of the Indiana Supreme Court; 1949–1953	Succeeded by Dan Flanagan
