= Jay Conison =

American lawyer

Jay Conison is an American attorney, professor of law and former dean of Charlotte School of Law. He was previously dean of Valparaiso University School of Law from 1998 to 2013.

== Education ==
Conison earned his B.A. degree in mathematics and philosophy from Yale College in 1975, and his M.A. in philosophy in 1978 and J.D. degree magna cum laude in 1981, from the University of Minnesota and the University of Minnesota Law School.

== Legal career ==
Conison was in private practice with Sonnenschein Nath & Rosenthal in Chicago from 1981 until 1990. He left the firm in 1991 to join the Oklahoma City University School of Law, where he served as assistant professor, associate professor, professor, associate dean and interim dean. In 1998 he became dean of the Valparaiso University School of Law, where he was also a professor of law. His area of specialization a research interests include: employee benefit plans, law and philosophy, and legal education.

== Law school administration career ==
On November 17, 2016, the American Bar Association announced sanctions against both Valparaiso University School of Law and Charlotte School of Law, each arising out of actions during Conison's time as dean.

On December 19, 2016, the Department of Education announced its decision to cut off Charlotte School of Law from access to student loans, due to the school's "non-compliance with the fundamental standards set by its accreditor" and its "substantial misrepresentations to current and prospective students regarding the nature and extent of its accreditation and the likelihood that its graduates would pass the bar exam".

In a letter to the school's president, Chidi Ogene, explaining its decision, the department expressed its position that the school misled current and potential students through its continued reference in promotional materials to its full compliance with ABA requirements at the time of its accreditation in 2011, absent clarification of the subsequent findings of non-compliance. The department notes that the school had been notified of its noncompliance on February 3, 2016. In addressing the significance of these findings to current and potential students, the department cites a letter, sent by Conison and Ogene to the ABA on October 4, 2016, acknowledging that disclosure of the findings would have a negative impact on the decisions of current and prospective students. The department also cites testimony by Conison at an ABA council meeting on October 21, 2016, indicating that while Conison confirmed that there would be no appeal of the finding of noncompliance, he requested that the school not be required to publicly disclose those findings for at least one year.

The overwhelming majority of the faculty at Charlotte School of Law voted no confidence in Dean Conison's ability to lead the law school. Faculty calls for the ouster of Conison and the ouster of President Ogene were plentiful and frequent. These calls went ignored by Infilaw executives, until Conison was removed from office in 2017.

== Professional activities, leadership and affiliations ==
Conison is recognized for his extensive work in a variety of roles with the American Bar Association and Association of American Law Schools, including:

American Bar Association, Section of Legal Education and Admissions to the Bar: Accreditation Committee, 2005 to present; Vice-chair, 2008 to present; Special Committee on Accreditation Transparency, 2007–08; ABA/AALS Sabbatical Inspection Teams (Member, chair, AALS Reporter) and LL.M. and Summer Program Inspector, 1998; Committee on Clinical and Skills Education, 1998–2004; Co-chair, 2001–2004.

American Bar Association, Rule of Law Initiative: Consultant to joint Rule of Law Initiative/United States Agency for International Development project in Republic of Georgia to develop, inter alia, improved Georgian systems for legal education and accreditation of law schools. Work involves organizing conference and leading programs, helping draft accreditation standards and assisting with implementation of conference outcomes, 2008 to present.

Association of American Law Schools: Libraries and Technology Committee, 1999–2002; Section on Employee Benefits Executive Committee, 2001–03; chair, 2002.

A member of the Illinois State, Indiana State, Porter County, Lake County and Chicago Bar Associations, Conison is also a Fellow of the Indiana Bar Foundation and past Director and Secretary of the Indiana Continuing Legal Education Forum. He is a past member of the Porter County Inns of Court and was a participating attorney with the American Civil Liberties Union of Illinois. He has also volunteered with the Indiana State Bar Association and Law School Admission Council. In August 2012, Conison was named as reporter for the American Bar Association's (ABA) Task Force on the Future of Legal Education. Conison writes a recurring column for The Huffington Post.

== Selected works ==
Employee Benefit Plans in a Nutshell (3d ed.) (West 2003)

Employee Benefit Plans in a Nutshell (West 1993)

Law School Education and Liberal CLE, 40 Val. U.L. Rev. 325 (2006)

Success, Status, and the Goals of a Law School, 37 U. Tol. L. Rev. 23 (2005)

Assurance, Reliance and Expectation, 6 S. Cal. Interdisc. L.J. 335 (1998)

The Pragmatics of Promise, 10 Can. J.L. & Jurisp. 273 (1997)

ERISA and the Language of Preemption, 72 Wash. U.L.Q. 619 (1994)

What Does Due Process Have To Do With Jurisdiction?, 46 Rutgers L. Rev. 1071 (1994)

== Personal ==
Conison was born in Cincinnati, Ohio, on October 21, 1953. He is married and has two children.
