= Tri Kappa =

American women's philanthropic organization

- Kappa Kappa Kappa
- Founded: February 22, 1901; 124 years ago Girls Classical School
- Type: Service
- Affiliation: Independent
- Status: Active
- Emphasis: Non-collegiate
- Scope: Indiana
- Member badge

- Pledge pin
- Colors: Black and White
- Symbol: Keys, Triangle, Carnation
- Flower: White carnation
- Jewel: Ruby, Sapphire, and Pearl
- Publication: Cross Keys
- Philanthropy: Riley Hospital for Children
- Chapters: 142 active, 94 associate
- Members: 8,000 lifetime
- Headquarters: 941 East 86th Street, Suite 103; Indianapolis, Indiana 46240; United States
- Website: www.trikappa.org

Kappa Kappa Kappa, Inc., commonly known as Tri Kappa, is an American service sorority with chapters throughout Indiana. It was established in 1901. Tri Kappa has approximately 8,000 members in more than 230 chapters.

== History ==
Beryl Showers and six other students at the May Wright Sewall Girls' Classical School in Indianapolis, Indiana founded Tri Kappa sorority on February 22, 1901. Its founding members were Lulu Baer, Bertha Matthews, Erma Ribeyre, Frances Roberts, Mary Sanders, Beryl Showers, and Gertrude Zumpe.

The founders elected officers, designed a pin, wrote a constitution, and established a purpose of "charity and kindness". Later, Tri Kappa's purpose became bringing women together to support charity, culture, and education.

Each of the founders was charged with creating a Tri Kappa chapter in her hometown. Showers and Mathews started the Alpha chapter in April 1901 in Bloomington, Indiana. Ribeyre established the Beta chapter in New Harmony, Indiana in 1902.

In June 1903, Tri Kappa held its first annual statewide convention in Bloomington. Showers was elected grand president and Rebeyre its vice president. The sorority's quarterly magazine, Cross Keys, was first published in 1903. Tri Kappa had fourteen chapters and 300 members in 1904. By 1913, it had grown to 45 chapters.

Although Tri Kappa chapters hold charity balls and social events, its main focus is charity and fundraising for nonprofit organizations. The sorority started its scholarship program in 1914. Tri Kappa established its first associate chapter in 1915 in Indianapolis. During World War I, its members rolled bandages and purchased an ambulance. Chapters also "adopted" French orphans.

In 1924, Tri Kappa donated $12,000 to the building fund for Riley Hospital for Children. The sorority also donated to Indiana University. In 1926, it selected the arts as its main philanthropy. Annually, Tri Kappa purchased tickets so that school children could attend the Indianapolis Symphony Orchestra. It established a traveling art exhibit, featuring works by Indiana artists that it purchased; this program still existed in the mid-1950s.

During World War II, the sorority raised funds for Save-A-Child adoptions and supported military base hospitals, veterans hospitals, the American Red Cross, and Freeman Army Airfield. Members also entertained soldiers and volunteered as bond salesmen, Gray Ladies, nurses aides, and Red Cross workers.

In the 1950s, Tri Kappa donated to the Northern Indiana Children's Hospital. By 1951, the sorority had 113 chapters and 68 associate chapters, with 21,000 members. It had 148 chapter, 137 associate chapters, and 12,000 members in 1994. In 1995, Indiana's Governor Evan Bayh declared the week of February 19 through the 24 as Tri Kappa Week.

As of 2024, Tri Kappa has approximately 8,000 members operating out of 142 chapters and 94 associate chapters. It remains an all-female organization, with all of its chapters in Indiana. Its headquarters are at 941 East 86th Street, Suite 103 in Indianapolis.

== Symbols ==
The original Tri Kappa badge, now used for council recognition.

Tri-Kappa notes "there has always been some discussion" over the awkward branding problem caused by the similarity of Tri Kappa's name and the unaffiliated racist group which uses the same initials. Thus, the sorority tends to use Tri Kappa as its standard branding and common name.

Tri Kappa's symbols are a pair of crossed keys, a triangle, and a white carnation. Its jewels are the ruby, sapphire, and pearl. Its colors are black and white. The sorority's original badge featured a skull and crossbones with the letters ΚΚΚ. The skull's eyes were filled with pearls or other Tri Kappa jewels. To better distinguish itself from the Ku Klux Klan, its badge was changed to a triangle that features the keys, triangle, and carnation, with variants that include one of the sorority's jewels at the corners. The pledge pin features crossed keys on a gold rectangular badge.

Tri Kappa's magazine is Cross Keys.

== Philanthropy ==
Tri Kappa chapters support local philanthropic projects and raise money collectively for statewide projects relating to charity, culture, and education. Annually, it gives around one million dollars to projects and institutions in Indiana.

Starting in 1914, Tri Kappa started awarding scholarships at the local and state levels. In 2022, its annual giving totaled nearly $500,000 through $1,000 scholarships to students enrolled in associate or baccalaureate programs. It also awards the Beryl Showers Holland Fellowship to an Indiana University graduate for advanced studies.

Tri Kappa has raised millions of dollars for the Riley Hospital for Children in Indianapolis. Other ongoing projects include the Tri Kappa Art Collection that is housed at Rose-Hulman Institute of Technology, the Ronald McDonald House, the Hoosier Salon, and the gifted and talented programs at Purdue University, Indiana State University, Rose-Hulman, and the Indiana Academy at Ball State University.

== Governance ==
Tri Kappa is overseen by a grand council that is elected at its statewide convention. Its original officers included president, vice president, secretary, treasurer, newsletter editor, and its founder Holland (née Showers) as a life member. The sorority divides the state into twelve administrative providences to oversee local chapters.

== Chapters ==
Tri Kappa has both active and associate chapters. Associate chapters are less active and consist of women who belonged to an active chapter for at least ten years. As of 2024, it has 142 active chapters and 94 associate chapters.

== Notable members ==
- Beulah Bondi, actress
- Katharine Craig (Alpha Omega), First Lady of Indiana
- Euphrasia Donnelly (Alpha Lambda), competition swimmer, Olympic champion, and former world record-holder
- Cecil M. Harden (Alpha Gamma), United States House of Representatives
- Martha Morgan Leslie (Epsilon), First Lady of Indiana
- Judy O’Bannon (Corydon), First Lady of Indiana
- Betsy Palmer (Beta Sigma), actress
- Marilyn Quayle (Chi), Second Lady of the United States
- Frances Tilton Weaver (honorary), attorney
- Susanne Zenor (Alpha Kappa), actress
