= Mart O'Malley =

American judge (1890–1972)

Martin Joseph "Mart" O'Malley (September 17, 1890 – September 9, 1972) was a justice of the Indiana Supreme Court from January 4, 1943, to January 3, 1949.

Born in Pittston, Pennsylvania, O'Malley was one of eleven siblings, and as a child had to drop out of school to work in a coal mine. Nevertheless, and without a high school education, he was able to attend Saint Thomas College in Scranton from 1910 to 1912, and received an LL.B. from Valparaiso University School of Law in 1915.

He practiced law intermittently in Huntington, Indiana, from 1922 to 1965, at one point defending humorist H. Allen Smith from an obscenity charge arising from Smith's authorship of a risque article. O'Malley served as Huntington County Attorney from 1930 to 1933, and as Huntington City Attorney from 1939 to 1943, during which time he became heavily involved in the Republican Party, supporting the candidacy of Wendell Willkie in the 1940 United States presidential election.

O'Malley was elected to the Indiana Supreme Court as a Republican in 1942, a strong year for Republicans in Indiana, in his first effort to obtain political office. He was defeated for re-election by Democratic challenger Paul G. Jasper in 1948, a strong year for Democrats. O'Malley's term ended in 1949.

Following his defeat, O'Malley returned to the private practice of law, forming the law firm of O'Malley and Brown. O'Malley served on various boards and committees, and again served as Huntington City Attorney from 1955 to 1956, and retired to St. Petersburg, Florida. He died in Gainesville, Florida, after falling ill while visiting his son there.

Political offices
Preceded by Curtis W. Roll	Justice of the Indiana Supreme Court; 1943–1949	Succeeded by Paul G. Jasper
